= List of cloud types =

Tropospheric cloud classification by altitude of occurrence. Multi-level and vertical genus-types not limited to a single altitude level include nimbostratus, cumulonimbus, and some of the larger cumulus species.

The list of cloud types groups all genera as high (cirro-, cirrus), middle (alto-), multi-level (nimbo-, cumulo-, cumulus), and low (strato-, stratus). These groupings are determined by the altitude level or levels in the troposphere at which each of the various cloud types are normally found. Small cumulus are commonly grouped with the low clouds because they do not show significant vertical extent. Of the multi-level genus-types, those with the greatest convective activity are often grouped separately as towering vertical. The genus types all have Latin names.

The genera are also grouped into five physical forms. These are, in approximate ascending order of instability or convective activity: stratiform sheets; cirriform wisps and patches; stratocumuliform patches, rolls, and ripples; cumuliform heaps, and cumulonimbiform towers that often have complex structures. Most genera are divided into species with Latin names, some of which are common to more than one genus. Most genera and species can be subdivided into varieties, also with Latin names, some of which are common to more than one genus or species. The essentials of the modern nomenclature system for tropospheric clouds were proposed by Luke Howard, a British manufacturing chemist and an amateur meteorologist with broad interests in science, in an 1802 presentation to the Askesian Society. Very low stratiform clouds that touch the Earth's surface are given the common names fog and mist, which are not included with the Latin nomenclature of clouds that form aloft in the troposphere.

Above the troposphere, stratospheric and mesospheric clouds have their own classifications with common names for the major types and alpha-numeric nomenclature for the subtypes. They are characterized by altitude as very high level (polar stratospheric) and extreme level (polar mesospheric). Three of the five physical forms in the troposphere are also seen at these higher levels, stratiform, cirriform, and stratocumuliform, although the tops of very large cumulonimbiform clouds can penetrate the lower stratosphere.

== Cloud identification and classification: Order of listed types ==
In section two of this page (Classification of major types), height ranges are sorted in approximate descending order of altitude expressed in general terms. On the cross-classification table, forms and genus types (including some genus sub-types) are shown from left to right in approximate ascending order of instability.

In sections three to five, terrestrial clouds are listed in descending order of the altitude range of each atmospheric layer in which clouds can form:

- mesospheric layer;
- stratospheric layer;
- tropospheric layer.
  - Within the troposphere, the cloud levels are listed in descending order of altitude range.
    - Non-vertical genus types (including some genus sub-types) are sorted into approximate descending order of altitude of the cloud bases.
    - Vertical or multi-level genera and genus sub-types can be based in the low or middle levels and are therefore placed between the non-vertical low and mid-level genus types and sub-types. These thick clouds are listed in approximate descending order of altitude of the cloud tops.
      - The species associated with each genus type are listed in approximate ascending order of instability where applicable.
      - The constituent varieties and associated supplementary features and mother clouds for each genus or species are arranged in approximate order of frequency of occurrence.

In section six, the cloud types in the general lists and the mother clouds in the applicable classification table are sorted in alphabetical order except where noted. The species table shows these types sorted from left to right in approximate ascending order of the convective instability of each species. The table for supplementary features has them arranged in approximate descending order of frequency of occurrence.

In section seven, extraterrestrial clouds can be found in the atmospheres of other planets in the Solar System and beyond. The planets with clouds are listed (not numbered) in order of their distance from the Sun, and the clouds on each planet are in approximate descending order of altitude.

== Cloud cross-classification throughout the homosphere ==
Cloud chart showing major tropospheric cloud types, grouped by altitude and form. See table below for classification.

The table that follows is very broad in scope much like the cloud genera template near the bottom of the article and upon which this table is partly based. There are some variations in styles of nomenclature between the classification scheme used for the troposphere (strict Latin except for surface based aerosols) and the higher levels of the homosphere (common terms, some informally derived from Latin). However, the schemes presented here share a cross-classification of physical forms and altitude levels to derive the 10 tropospheric genera, the fog and mist that forms at surface level, and several additional major types above the troposphere. The cumulus genus includes four species that indicate vertical size which can affect the altitude levels.

Form Level	Stratiform non-convective	Cirriform mostly non-convective	Stratocumuliform limited-convective	Cumuliform free-convective	Cumulonimbiform strong-convective
Extreme-level	Noctilucent (NLC) veils	Noctilucent billows or whirls	Noctilucent bands		
Very high-level	Nitric acid & water polar stratospheric (PSC)	Cirriform nacreous PSC	Lenticular nacreous PSC		
High-level	Cirrostratus (Cs)	Cirrus (Ci)	Cirrocumulus (Cc)		
Mid-level	Altostratus (As)		Altocumulus (Ac)		
Towering vertical				Cumulus congestus (Cu con)	Cumulonimbus (Cb)
Multi-level or moderate vertical	Nimbostratus(Ns)			Cumulus mediocris (Cu med)	
Low-level	Stratus (St)		Stratocumulus (Sc)	Cumulus humilis (Cu hum) or fractus (Cu fr)	
Surface-level	Fog or mist				

== Mesospheric cloud identification and classification ==
Clouds that form in the mesosphere come in a variety of forms such as veils, bands, and billows, but are not given Latin names based on these characteristics. These clouds are the highest in the atmosphere and are given the Latin-derived name noctilucent which refers to their illumination during deep twilight rather than their physical forms. They are sub-classified alpha-numerically and with common terms according to specific details of their physical structures.

=== Extreme-level stratiform, stratocumuliform, and cirriform ===
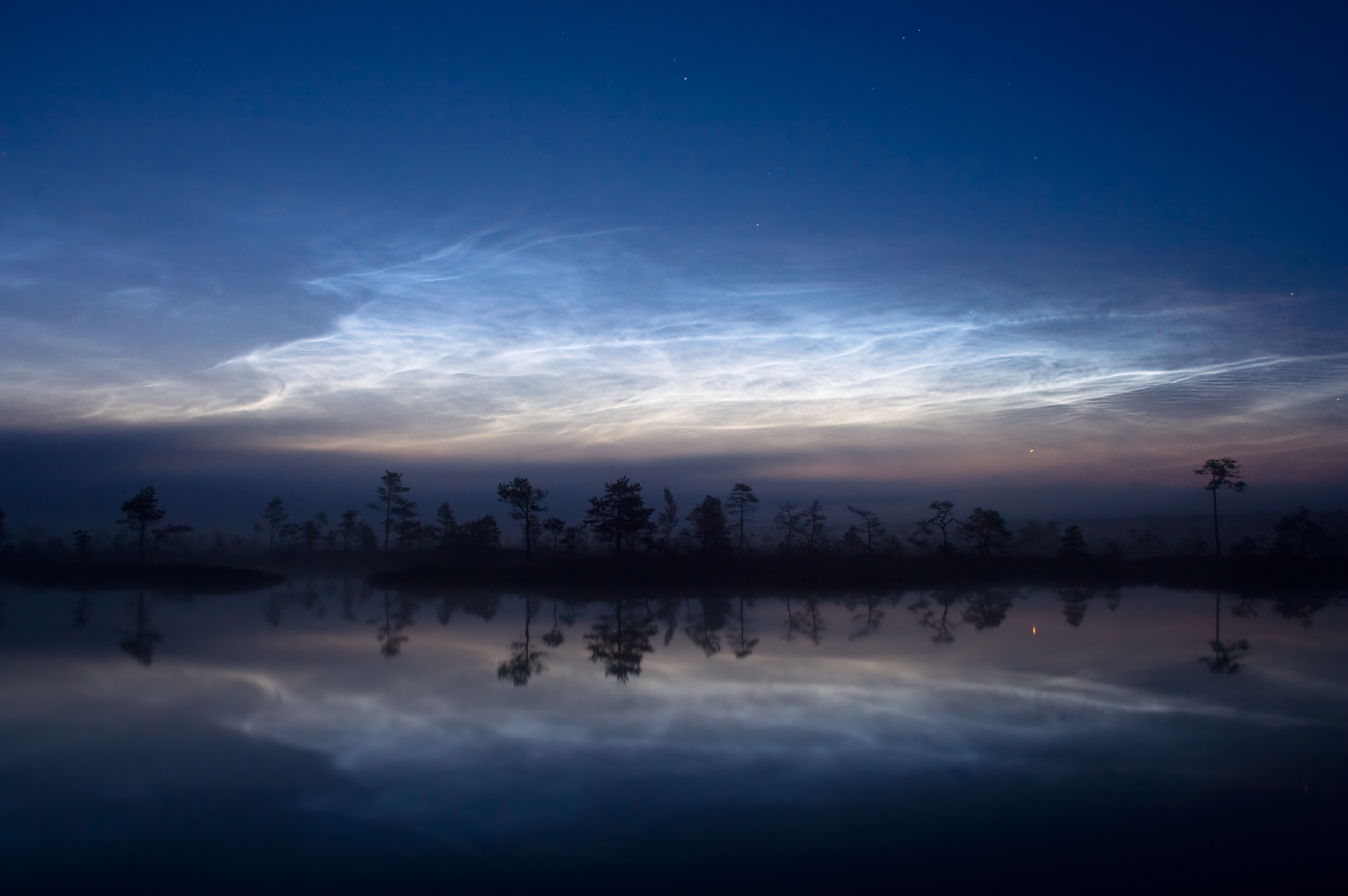
Mesospheric noctilucent clouds over Estonia

Noctilucent clouds are thin clouds that come in a variety of forms based from about 80 to 85 kilometres (262,000–279,000 ft) and occasionally seen in deep twilight after sunset and before sunrise.

Type 1
Veils, very tenuous stratiform; resembles cirrostratus or poorly defined cirrus.
Type 2
Long stratocumuliform bands, often in parallel groups or interwoven at small angles. More widely spaced than cirrocumulus bands.

2A
Bands with diffuse, blurred edges.
2B
Bands with sharply defined edges.

Type 3
Billows. Clearly spaced, fibrous cirriform, roughly parallel short streaks.

3A
Short, straight, narrow streaks.
3B
Wave-like structures with undulations.

Type 4
Whirls. Partial (or, more rarely, complete) cirriform rings with dark centers.

4A
Whirls possessing a small angular radius of curvature, sometimes resembling light ripples on a water surface.
4B
Simple curve of medium angular radius with one or more streaks.
4C
Whirls with large-scale ring structures.

== Stratospheric cloud identification and classification ==
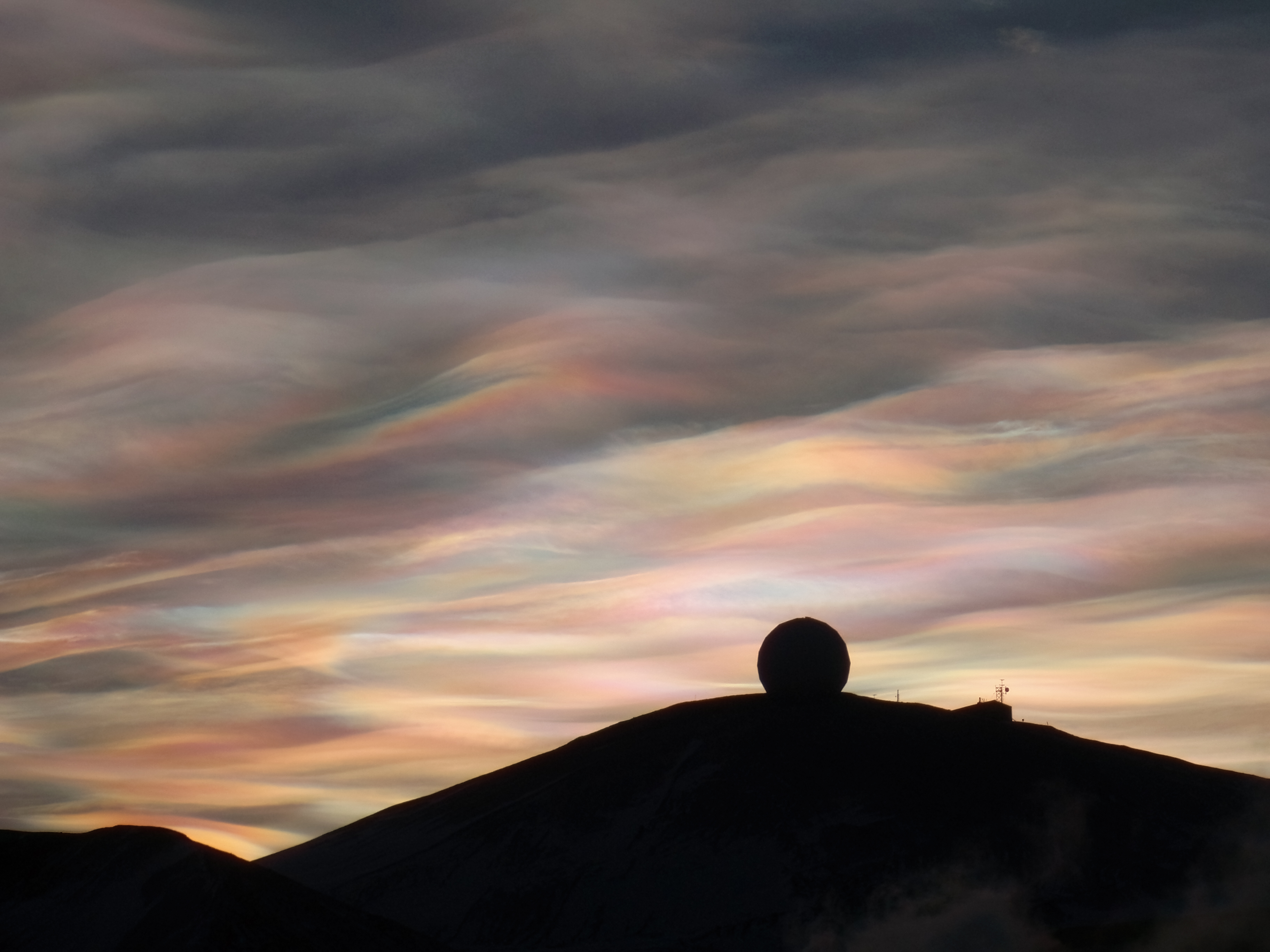
Stratospheric nacreous clouds over Antarctica

Polar stratospheric clouds form at very high altitudes in polar regions of the stratosphere. Those that show mother-of-pearl colors are given the name nacreous.

=== Very high-level stratiform ===
Nitric acid and water polar stratospheric
Sometimes known as type 1, a thin sheet-like cloud resembling cirrostratus or haze. Contains supercooled nitric acid and water droplets; sometimes also contains supercooled sulfuric acid in ternary solution.

=== Very high-level cirriform and stratocumuliform ===
Nacreous polar stratospheric cloud (mother of pearl)
Sometimes known as type 2, a thin usually cirriform or lenticular (stratocumuliform) looking cloud based from about 18 to 30 kilometres (59,000–98,000 ft) and seen most often between sunset and sunrise. Consists of ice crystals only.

== Troposphere cloud identification and classification ==
Tropospheric clouds are divided into physical forms defined by structure, and levels defined by altitude range. These divisions are cross-classified to produce ten basic genus-types. They have Latin names as authorized by the World Meteorological Organization (WMO) that indicate physical structure, altitude or étage, and process of formation.

=== High-level cirriform, stratocumuliform, and stratiform ===
High clouds form in the highest and coldest region of the troposphere from about 5 to 12 km (16,500 to 40,000 ft) in temperate latitudes. At this altitude water almost always freezes so high clouds are generally composed of ice crystals or supercooled water droplets.

==== Genus cirrus ====
Abbreviation: Ci

Cirriform clouds tend to be wispy and are mostly transparent or translucent. Isolated cirrus do not bring rain; however, large amounts of cirrus can indicate an approaching storm system eventually followed by fair weather.

There are several variations of clouds of the cirrus genus based on species and varieties:

===== Species =====
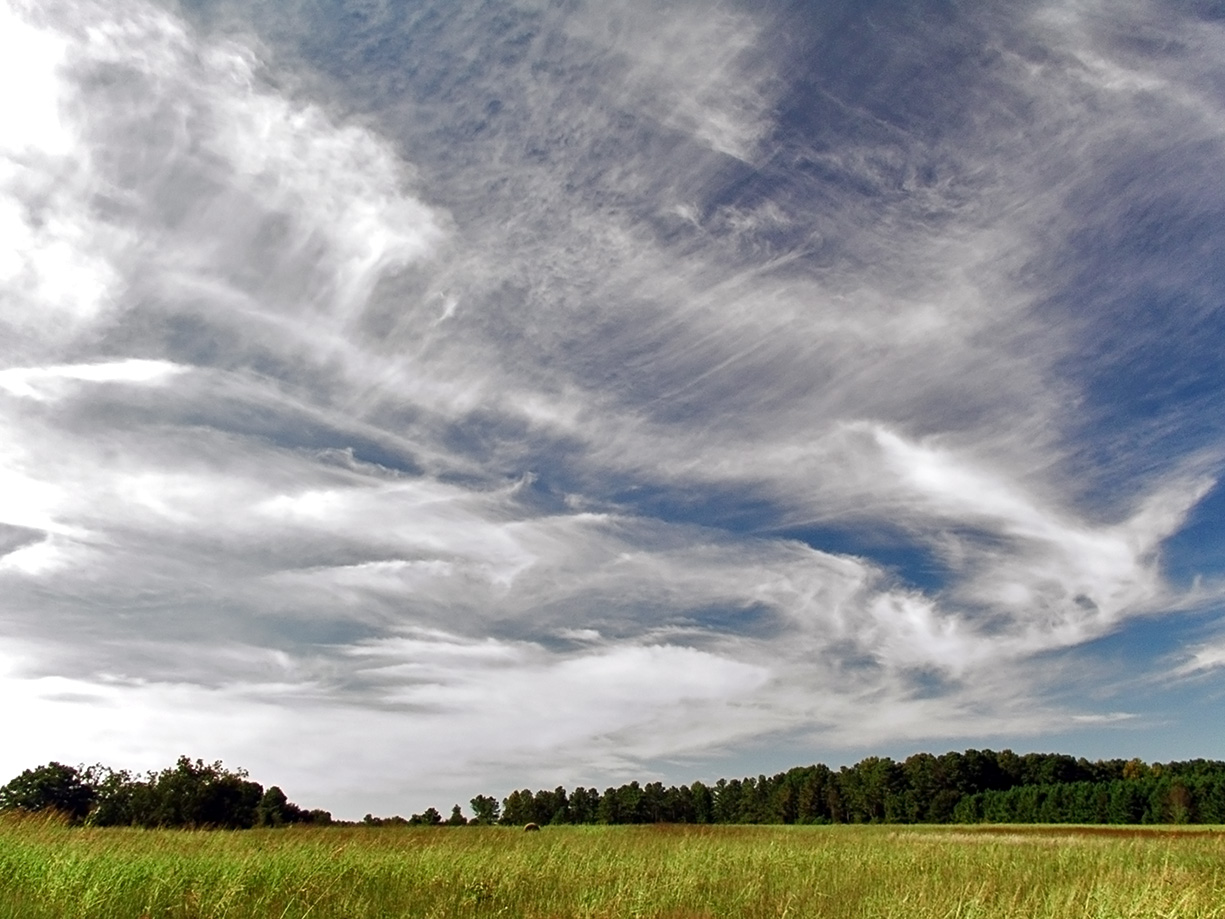
Cirrus spissatus

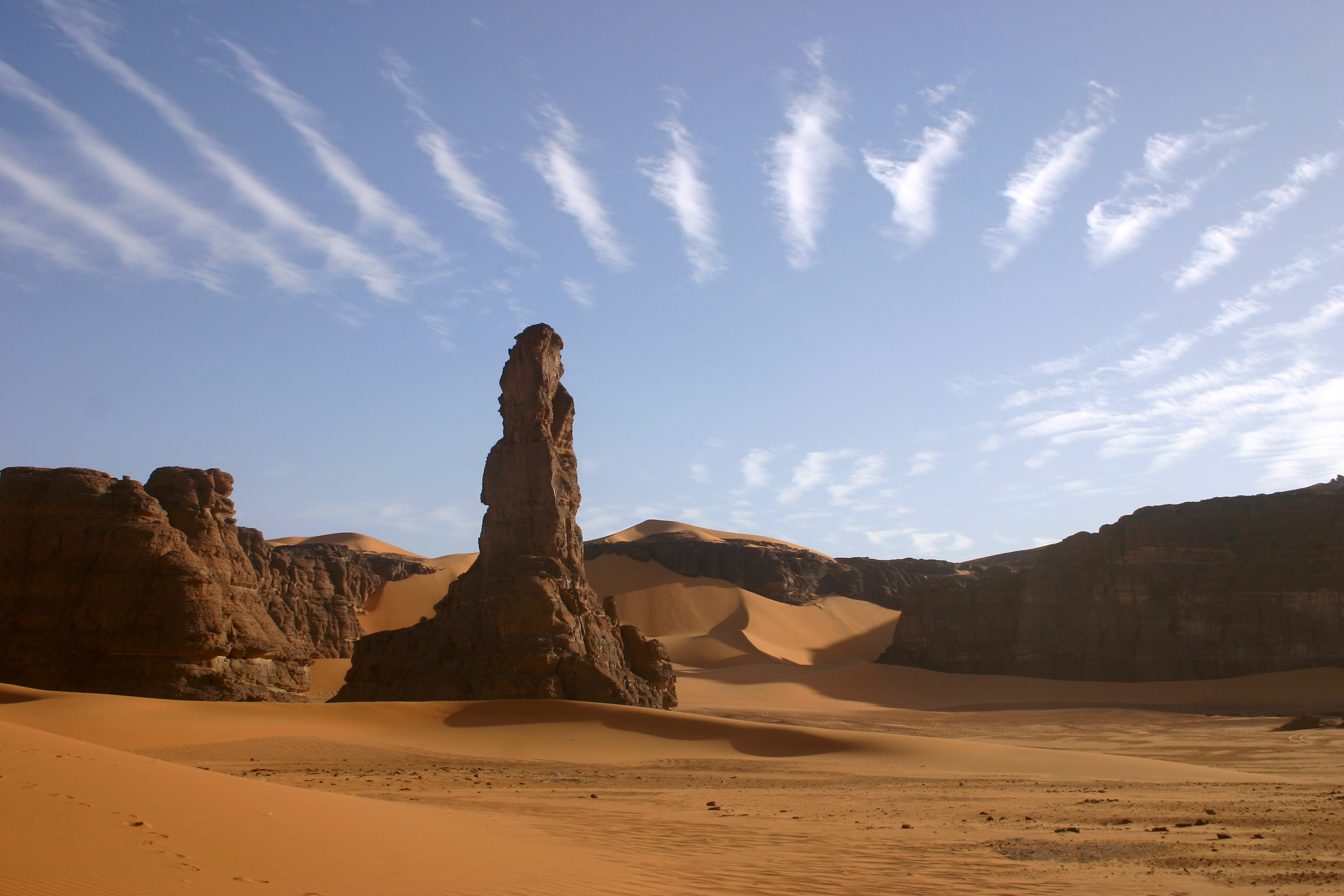
Cirrus fibratus radiatus

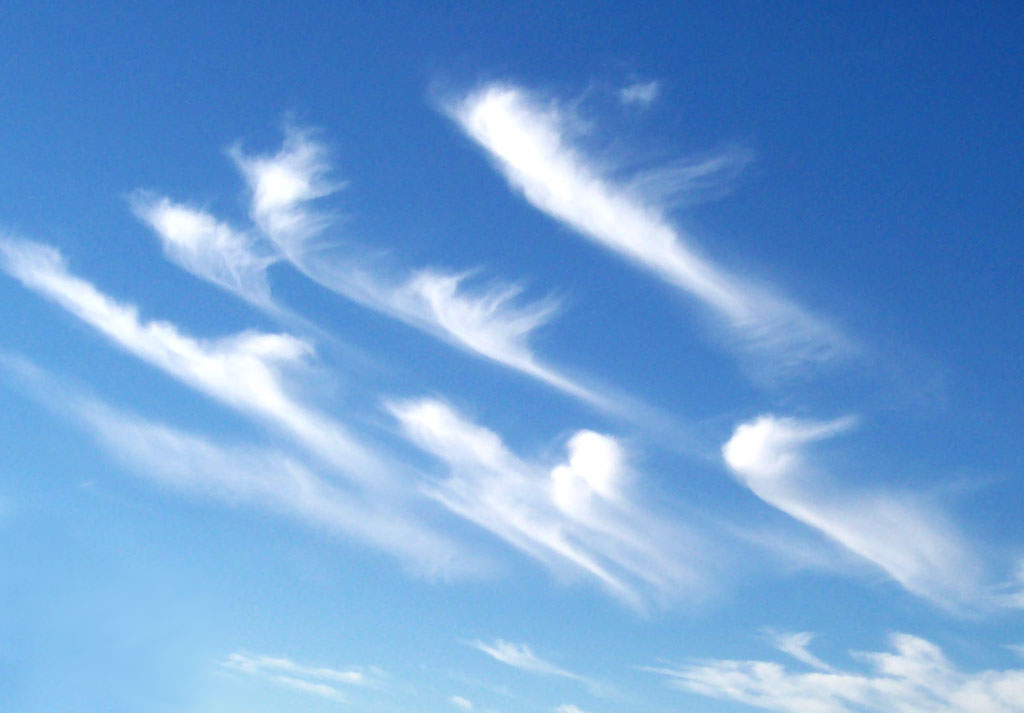
Cirrus uncinus

Cirrus fibratus
High clouds having the traditional "mare's tail" appearance. These clouds are long, fibrous, and curved, with no tufts or curls at the ends.
Cirrus uncinus
Filaments with up-turned hooks or curls.
Cirrus spissatus
Dense and opaque or mostly opaque patches.
Cirrus castellanus
A series of dense lumps, or "towers", connected by a thinner base.
Cirrus floccus
Elements which take on a rounded appearance on the top, with the lower part appearing ragged.

===== Varieties =====
Opacity-based
None; always translucent except species spissatus which is inherently opaque.
Fibratus pattern-based

Cirrus fibratus intortus
Irregularly curved or tangled filaments.
Cirrus fibratus vertebratus
Elements arranged in the manner of a vertebrate or fish skeleton.

Pattern-based variety radiatus
Large horizontal bands that appear to converge at the horizon; normally associated with fibratus and uncinus species.

Cirrus fibratus radiatus
Cirrus uncinus radiatus

Pattern-based variety duplicatus
Sheets at different layers of the upper troposphere, which may be connected at one or more points; normally associated with fibratus and uncinus species.

Cirrus fibratus duplicatus
Cirrus uncinus duplicatus

Spissatus, castellanus, or floccus
Varieties are not commonly associated.

===== Supplementary features =====
Precipitation-based
Not associated with cirrus.
Cloud-based

Mamma
Bubble-like downward protuberances; mostly seen with species castellanus.

Genitus mother clouds

Cirrus cirrocumulogenitus
Cirrus altocumulogenitus
Cirrus cumulonimbogenitus
Cirrus homogenitus
Cirrus formed by spreading of aircraft contrails.

Mutatus mother cloud

Cirrus cirrostratomutatus
Cirrus homomutatus
Cirrus formed by the complete transformation of cirrus homogenitus.

==== Genus cirrocumulus ====
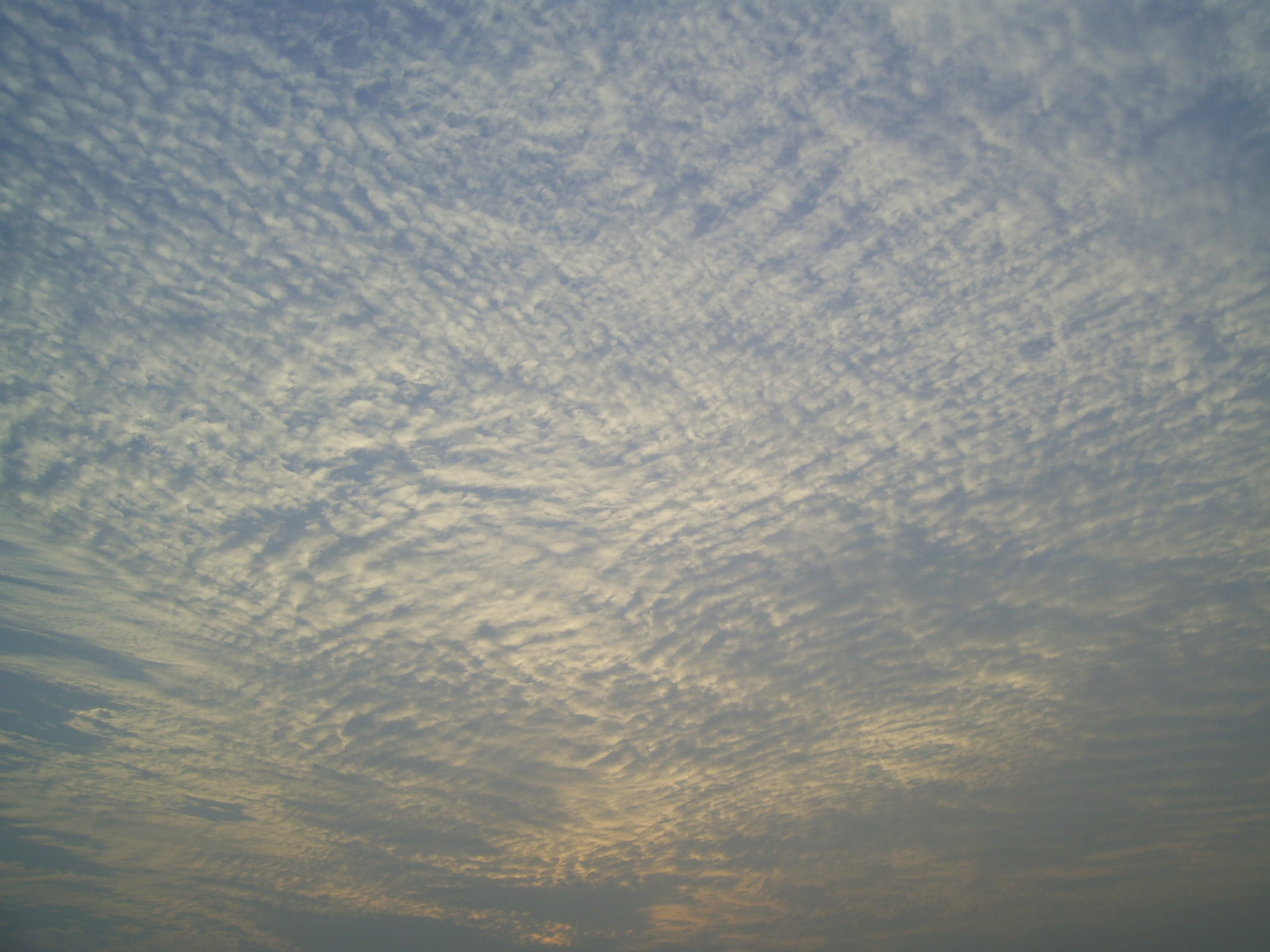
A large field of cirrocumulus stratiformis

Abbreviation: Cc.

High-level stratocumuliform clouds of the genus cirrocumulus form when moist air at high tropospheric altitude reaches saturation, creating ice crystals or supercooled water droplets. Limited convective instability at the cloud level gives the cloud a rolled or rippled appearance. Despite the lack of a strato- prefix, layered cirrocumulus is physically a high stratocumuliform genus.

===== Species =====
Cirrocumulus stratiformis
Sheets or relatively flat patches of cirrocumulus.
Cirrocumulus lenticularis
Lenticular, or lens-shaped high cloud.
Cirrocumulus castellanus
Cirrocumulus layer with "towers", or turrets joined at the bases.
Cirrocumulus floccus
Very small white heaps with ragged bases and rounded tops.

===== Varieties =====
Opacity-based varieties
None (always translucent).
Pattern-based varieties

Undulatus
Cirrocumulus with an undulating base; normally associated with stratiformis and lenticularis species.

Stratocumuliform undulatus
Cirrocumulus stratiformis undulatus
Cirrocumulus lenticularis undulatus

Lacunosus
Cirrocumulus with large clear holes; normally associated with stratiformis and castellanus species (also with cumuliform floccus species).

Stratocumuliform lacunosus
Cirrocumulus stratiformis lacunosus
Cirrocumulus castellanus lacunosus
Cirrocumulus floccus lacunosus

===== Supplementary features =====
Precipitation-based supplementary feature

Virga
Light precipitation that evaporates well above ground level; mostly seen with species stratiformis, castellanus, and floccus.

Cloud-based supplementary feature

Mamma
Bubble-like downward protuberances; mostly seen with species castellanus.

Genitus mother clouds
No genitus types.
Mutatus mother clouds

Cirrocumulus cirromutatus
Cirrocumulus cirrostratomutatus
Cirrocumulus altocumulomutatus
Cirrocumulus homomutatus
Results from the transformation of cirrus homogenitus.

==== Genus cirrostratus ====
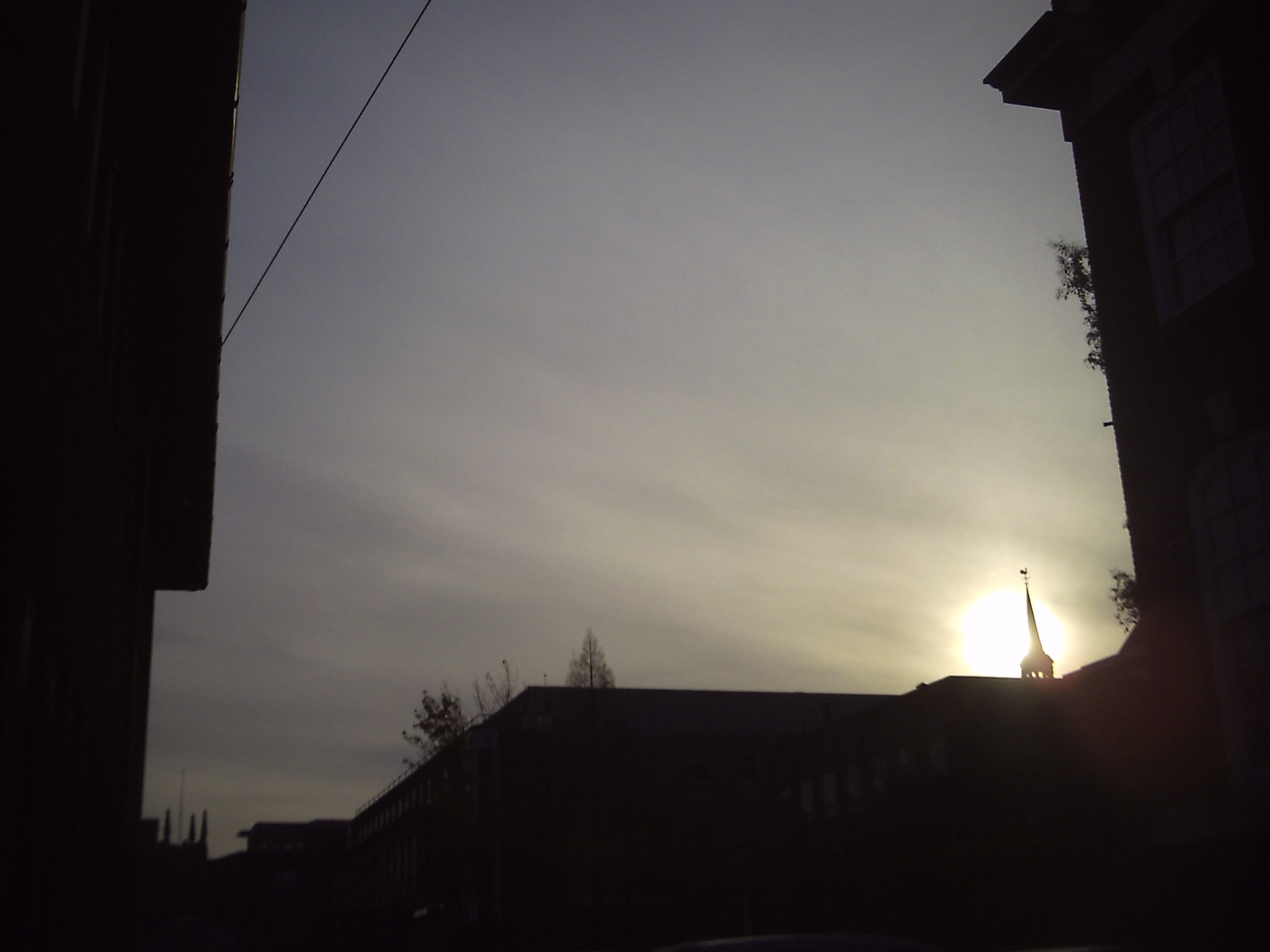
Cirrostratus nebulosus merging into darker altostratus translucidus

Abbreviation: Cs

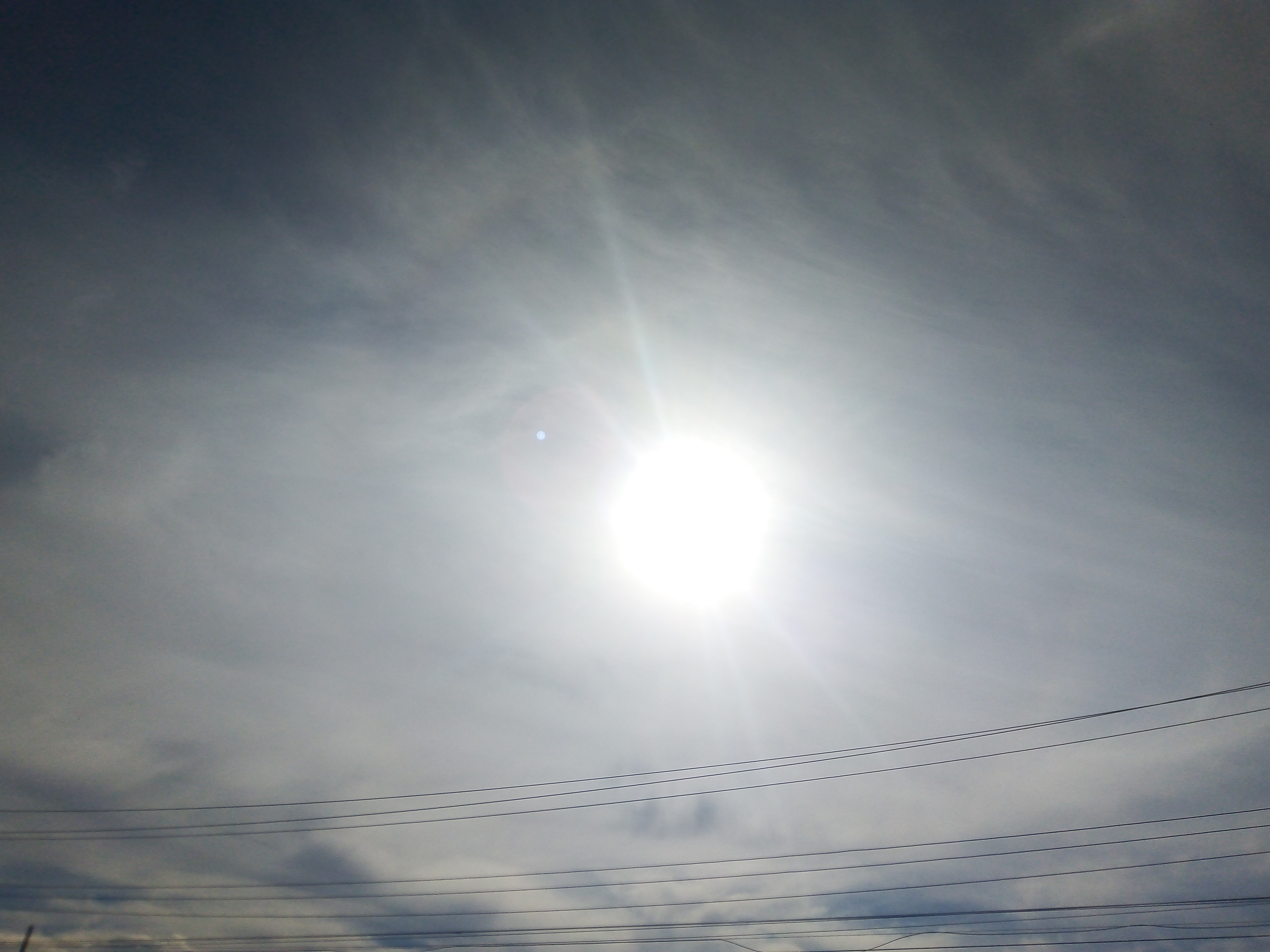
Cirrostratus fibratus undulatus

Clouds of the genus cirrostratus consist of mostly continuous, wide sheets of cloud that covers a large area of the sky. It is formed when convectively stable moist air cools to saturation at high altitude, forming ice crystals. Frontal cirrostratus is a precursor to rain or snow if it thickens into mid-level altostratus and eventually nimbostratus, as the weather front moves closer to the observer.

===== Species =====
Cirrostratus fibratus
Cirrostratus sheet with a fibrous appearance, but not as detached as cirrus.
Cirrostratus nebulosus
Featureless, uniform sheet.

===== Varieties =====
Opacity-based varieties
None (always translucent)
Fibratus pattern-based varieties

Cirrostratus fibratus duplicatus
Separate or semi-merged sheets with one layer slightly above the other.
Cirrostratus fibratus undulatus
Undulating waves.

Varieties are not commonly associated with Cs species nebulosus.

===== Supplementary features =====
Supplementary features/accessory clouds: Not associated with cirrostratus.
Genitus mother clouds

Cirrostratus cirrocumulogenitus
Cirrostratus cumulonimbogenitus

Mutatus mother clouds

Cirrostratus cirromutatus
Cirrostratus cirrocumulomutatus
Cirrostratus altostratomutatus
Cirrostratus homomutatus
Results from the transformation of cirrus homogenitus.

=== Mid-level stratocumuliform and stratiform ===
Middle cloud forms from 2 to 7 km (6,500–23,000 ft) in temperate latitudes, and may be composed of water droplets or ice crystals depending on the temperature profile at that altitude range.

==== Genus altocumulus ====
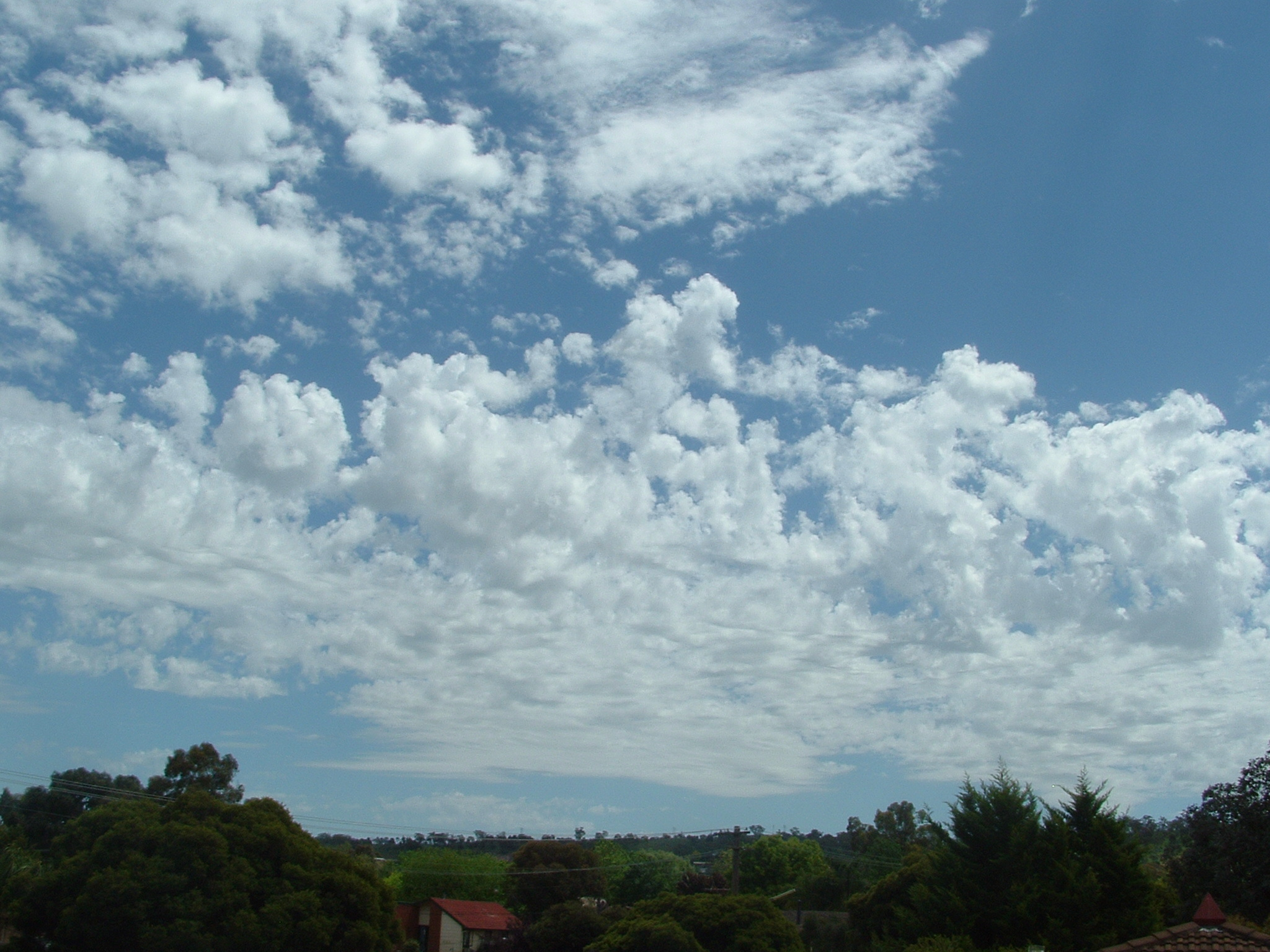
Altocumulus castellanus

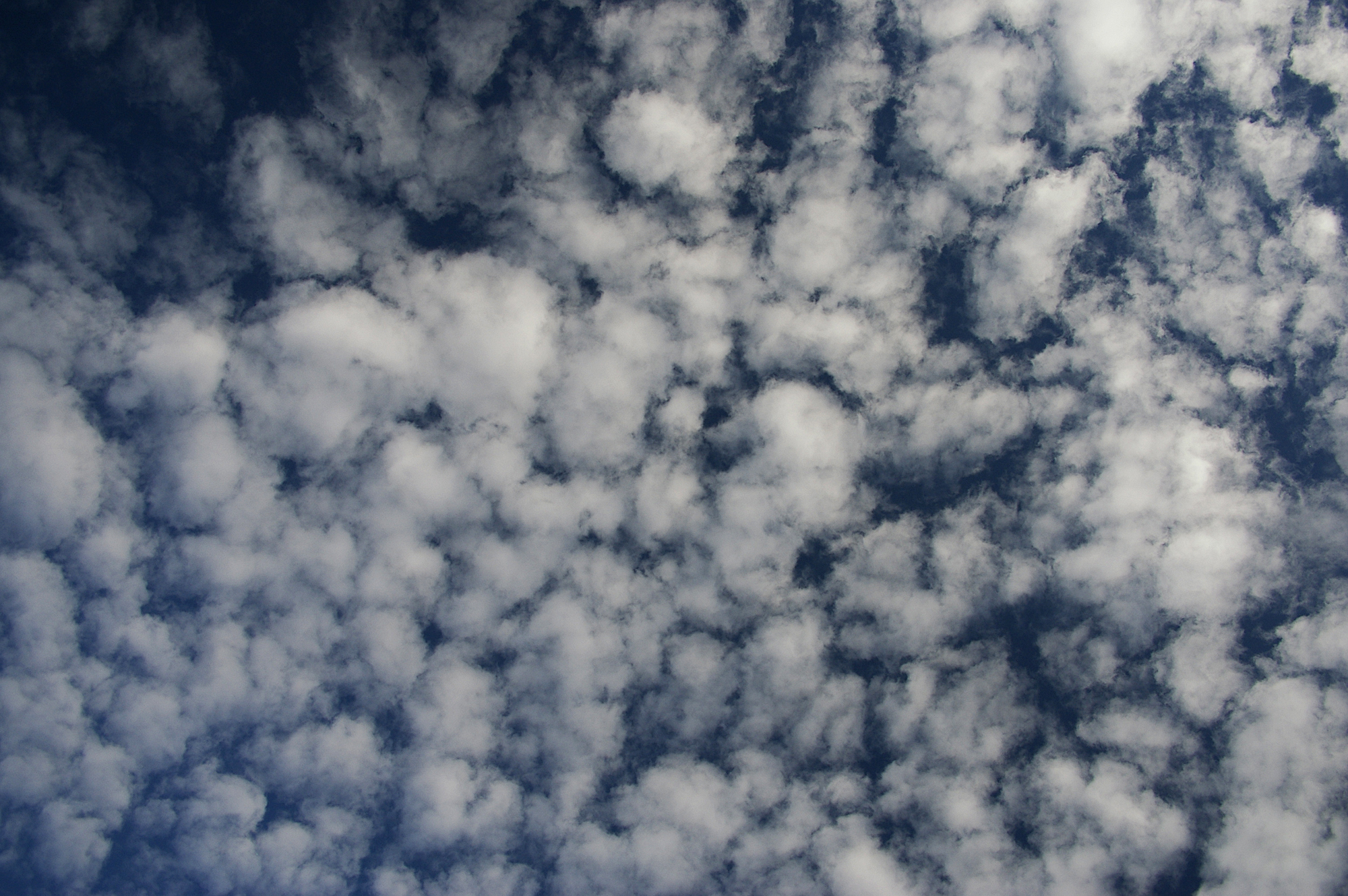
Altocumulus floccus

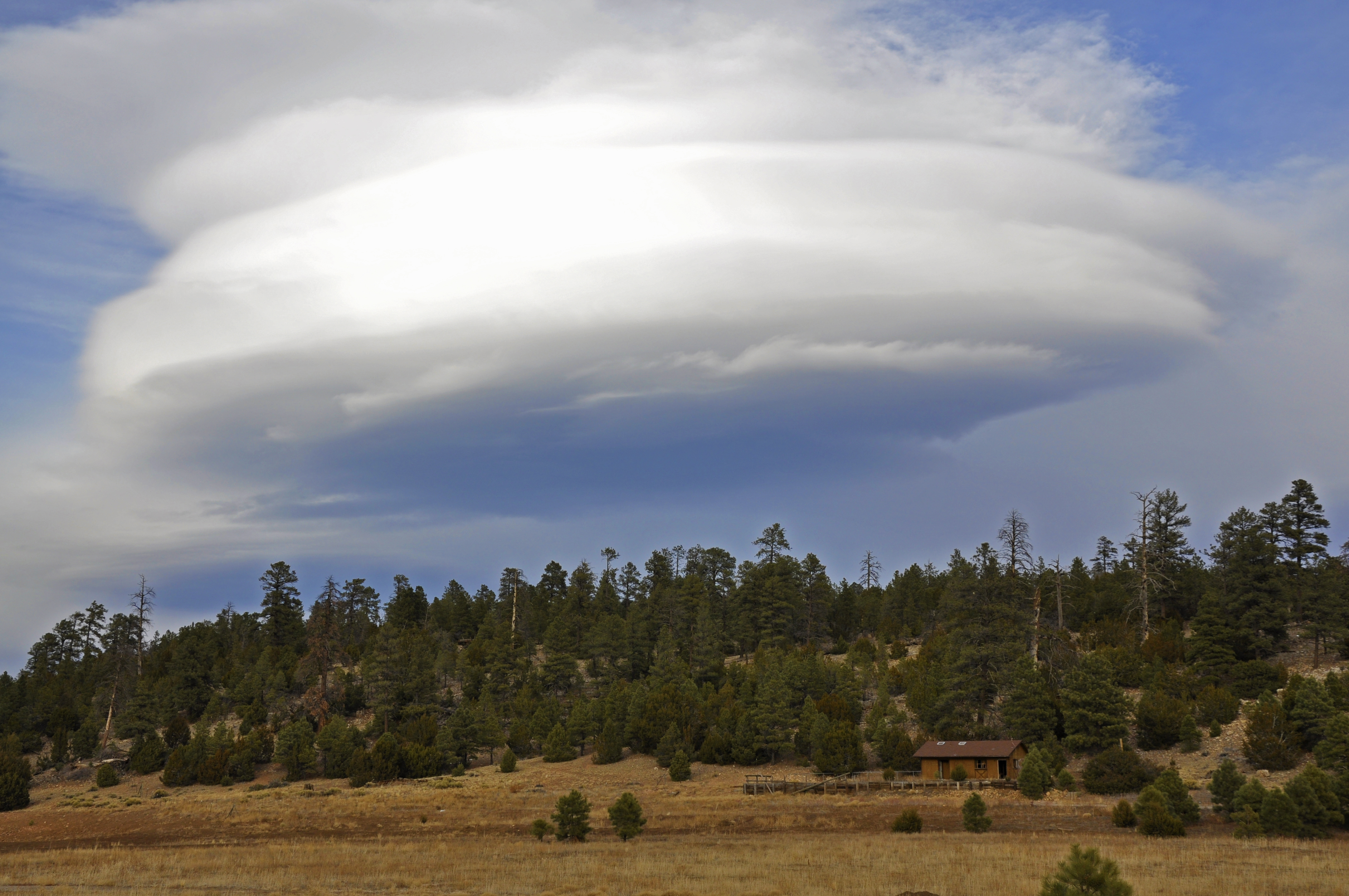
Altocumulus lenticularis duplicatus

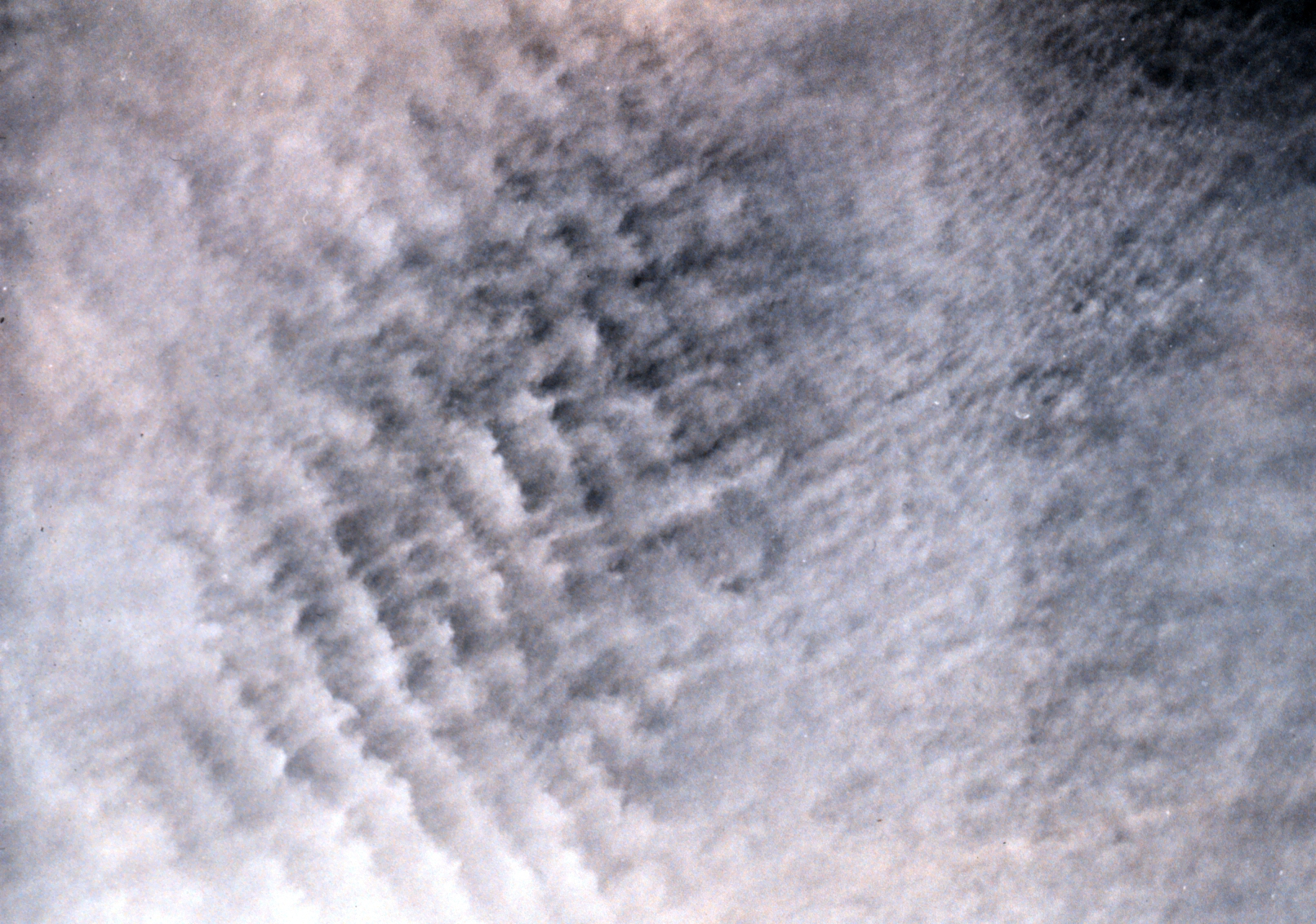
Altocumulus stratiformis translucidus undulatus

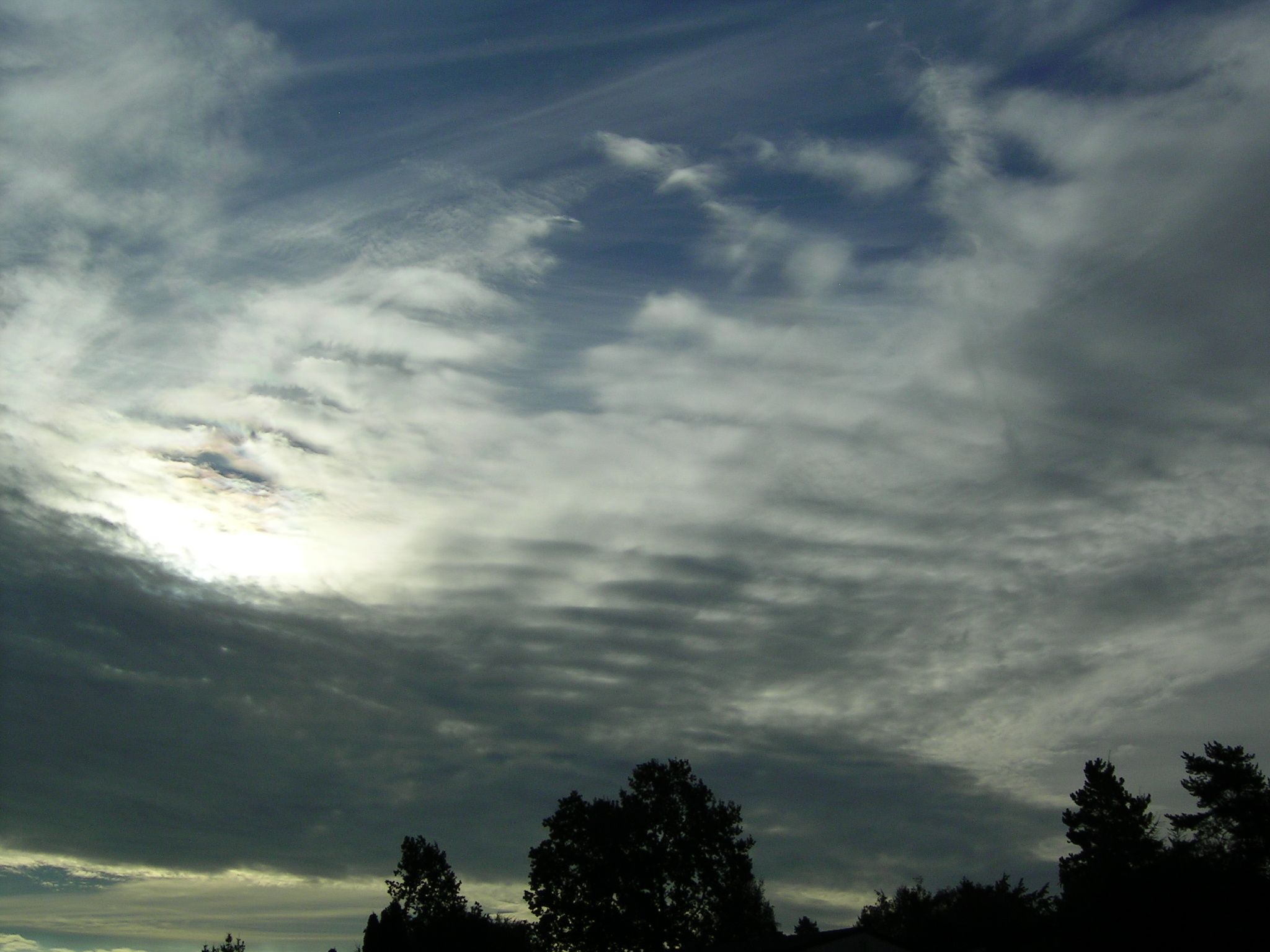
Altocumulus stratiformis perlucidus undulatus clouds merging into altostratus opacus, with higher layer of cirrus fibratus

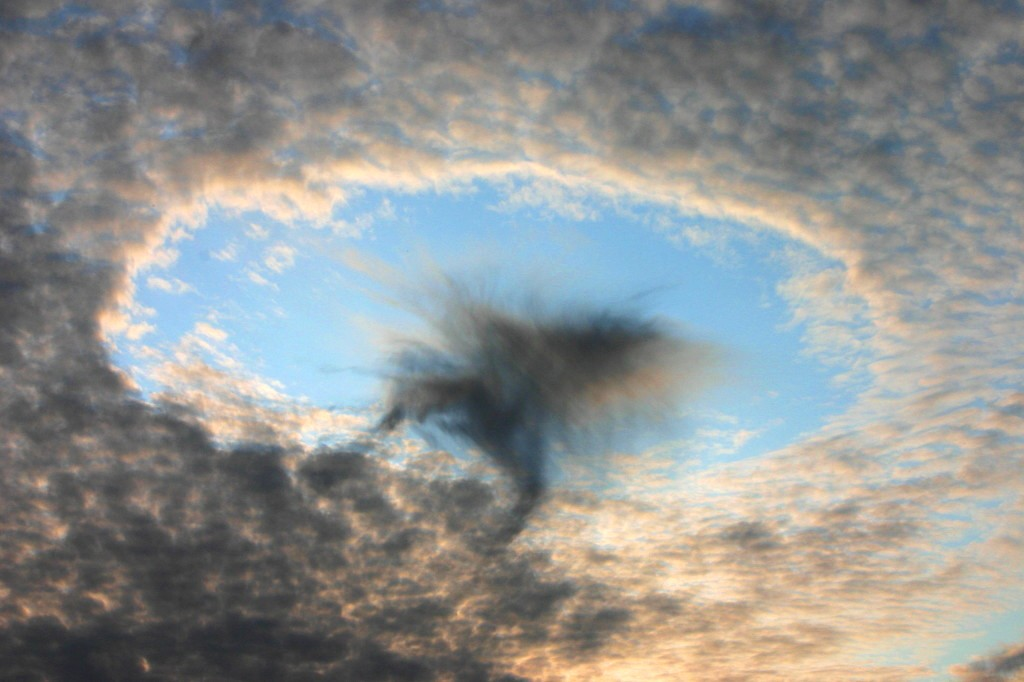
Altocumulus stratiformis translucidus perlucidus cavum

Abbreviation: Ac

Mid-level stratocumuliform clouds of the genus altocumulus are not always associated with a weather front but can still bring precipitation, usually in the form of virga which does not reach the ground. Layered forms of altocumulus are generally an indicator of limited convective instability, and are therefore mainly stratocumuliform in structure.

===== Mid-level stratocumuliform species =====
Altocumulus stratiformis
Always dividable into opacity-based varieties. Sheets or relatively flat patches of altocumulus.
Altocumulus lenticularis
Lens-shaped middle cloud. Includes informal variant altocumulus Kelvin–Helmholtz cloud, lenticular spiral indicative of severe turbulence.
Altocumulus volutus
Elongated, tube shaped, horizontal stratocumuliform cloud.
Altocumulus castellanus
Turreted layer cloud.
Altocumulus floccus
Tufted stratocumuliform clouds with ragged bases.

===== Varieties =====
Opacity-based varieties

Altocumulus stratiformis translucidus
Translucent altocumulus through which the sun or moon can be seen.
Altocumulus stratiformis perlucidus
Opaque middle clouds with translucent breaks.
Altocumulus stratiformis opacus
Opaque altocumulus that obscures the sun or moon.

Pattern-based varieties

Radiatus
Rows of altocumulus that appear to converge at the horizon; normally associated with stratiformis species.

Altocumulus stratiformis translucidus radiatus
Altocumulus stratiformis perlucidus radiatus
Altocumulus stratiformis opacus radiatus

Duplicatus
Altocumulus in closely spaced layers, one above the other; normally associated with stratiformis and lenticularis species.

Altocumulus stratiformis translucidus duplicatus
Altocumulus stratiformis perlucidus duplicatus
Altocumulus stratiformis opacus duplicatus
Altocumulus lenticularis duplicatus

Undulatus
Altocumulus with wavy undulating base; normally associated with stratiformis and lenticularis species.

Altocumulus stratiformis translucidus undulatus
Altocumulus stratiformis perlucidus undulatus
Altocumulus stratiformis opacus undulatus
Altocumulus lenticularis undulatus

Lacunosus
Altocumulus with circular holes caused by localized downdrafts; normally associated with stratiformis and castellanus species (also with cumuliform floccus species).

Altocumulus stratiformis translucidus lacunosus
Altocumulus stratiformis perlucidus lacunosus
Altocumulus stratiformis opacus lacunosus
Altocumulus castellanus lacunosus
Altocumulus floccus lacunosus

===== Supplementary features =====
Precipitation-based supplementary feature

Virga
Altocumulus producing precipitation that evaporates before reaching the ground; usually associated with species stratiformis, castellanus, and floccus.

Cloud-based supplementary feature

Mamma
Altocumulus (usually species castellanus) with downward facing bubble-like protuberances caused by localized downdrafts within the cloud.

Genitus mother clouds

Altocumulus cumulogenitus
Altocumulus cumulonimbogenitus

Mutatus mother clouds

Altocumulus cirrocumulomutatus
Altocumulus altostratomutatus
Altocumulus nimbostratomutatus
Altocumulus stratocumulomutatus

==== Genus altostratus ====
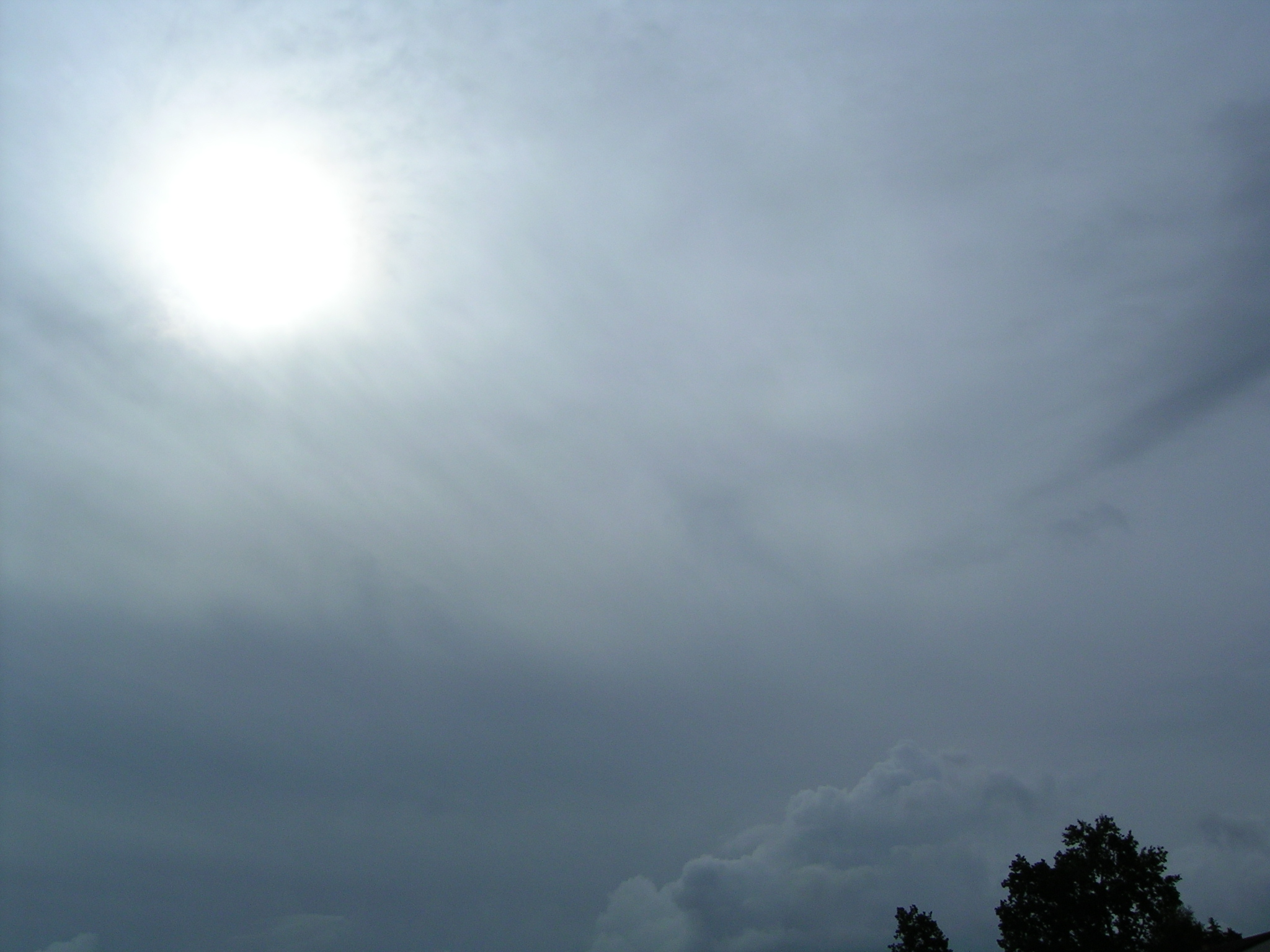
Altostratus translucidus near top of photo thickening into altostratus opacus near bottom

Abbreviation: As

Stratiform clouds of the genus altostratus form when a large convectively stable air mass is lifted to condensation in the middle level of the troposphere, usually along a frontal system. Altostratus can bring light rain or snow. If the precipitation becomes continuous, it may thicken into nimbostratus which can bring precipitation of moderate to heavy intensity.

===== Species =====
No differentiated species (always nebulous).

===== Varieties =====
Opacity-based varieties

Altostratus translucidus
Altostratus through which the sun can be seen.
Altostratus opacus
Altostratus that completely blocks out the sun.

Pattern-based variety radiatus
Bands that appear to converge at the horizon.

Altostratus translucidus radiatus
Altostratus opacus radiatus

Pattern-based variety duplicatus
Altostratus in closely spaced layers, one above the other.

Altostratus translucidus duplicatus
Altostratus opacus duplicatus

Pattern-based variety undulatus
Altostratus with wavy undulating base.

Altostratus translucidus undulatus
Altostratus opacus undulatus

===== Supplementary features =====
Precipitation-based supplementary features

Virga
Accompanied by precipitation that evaporates before reaching the ground. Seen mostly with opacus varieties.
Praecipitatio
Produces precipitation that reaches the ground; associated with opacus varieties.

Cloud-based supplementary feature

Mamma
Altostratus with downward facing bubble-like protuberances caused by localized downdrafts within the cloud.

Accessory cloud
Seen mostly with opacus varieties

Pannus
Accompanied by ragged lower layer of fractus species clouds forming in precipitation.

Genitus mother clouds

Altostratus altocumulogenitus
Altostratus cumulonimbogenitus

Mutatus mother clouds

Altostratus cirrostratomutatus
Altostratus nimbostratomutatus

=== Towering vertical cumulonimbiform and cumuliform (low to mid-level cloud base) ===
Clouds with upward-growing vertical development usually form below 2 kilometres (6,600 ft), but can be based as high as 2.5 kilometres (8,200 ft) in temperate climates, and often much higher in arid regions.

==== Genus cumulonimbus: Towering vertical ====
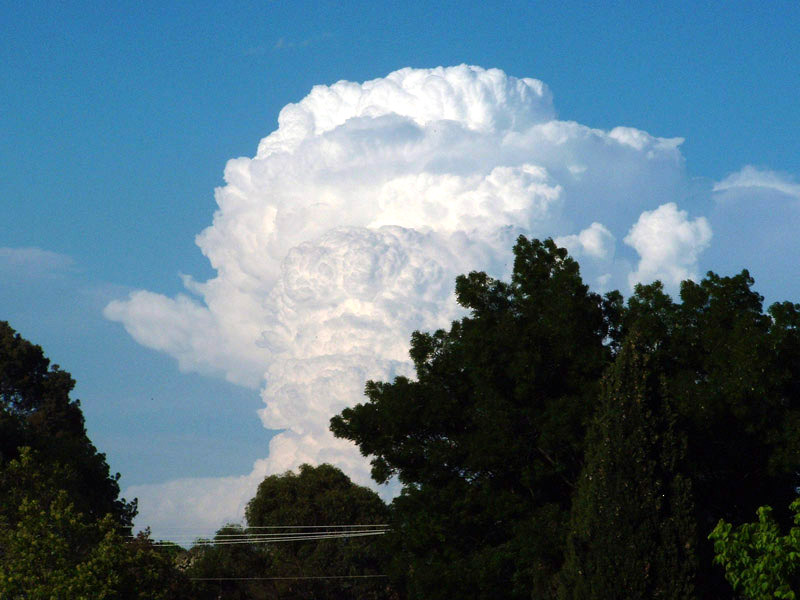
Cumulonimbus calvus

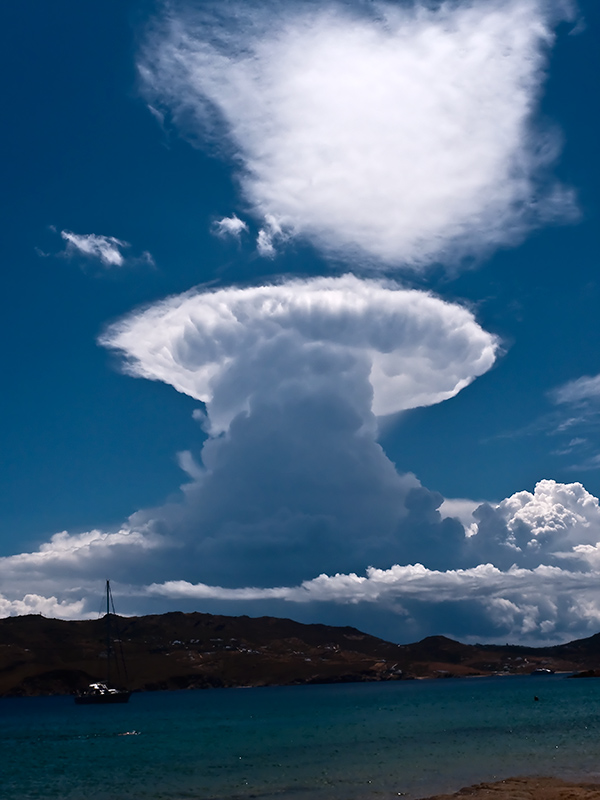
Single-cell Cumulonimbus capillatus incus

Abbreviation: Cb

Clouds of the genus cumulonimbus have very-dark-gray-to-nearly-black flat bases and very high tops that can penetrate the tropopause. They develop from cumulus when the air mass is convectively highly unstable. They generally produce thunderstorms, rain or showers, and sometimes hail, strong outflow winds, and/or tornadoes at ground level.

===== Species =====
Cumulonimbus calvus
Cumulonimbus with high domed top.
Cumulonimbus capillatus
Towering vertical cloud with high cirriform top.

===== Varieties =====
No varieties (always opaque and does not form in patterns visible from surface level).

===== Supplementary features =====
Precipitation-based supplementary features
Associated with calvus and capillatus species.

Virga
Precipitation that evaporates before reaching the ground.
Praecipitatio
Precipitation that reaches the ground.

Cloud-based supplementary features

Incus (species capillatus only)
Cumulonimbus with flat anvil-like cirriform top caused by wind shear where the rising air currents hit the inversion layer at the tropopause.
Mamma
Also sometimes called Mammatus, consisting of bubble-like protrusions on the underside caused by localized downdrafts.
Arcus (including roll and shelf clouds)
Low, horizontal cloud formation associated with the leading edge of thunderstorm outflow.
Tuba
Column hanging from the cloud base; a funnel cloud or tornado.

Accessory clouds
Seen with species and capillatus except where noted.

Pannus
Accompanied by a lower layer of fractus species cloud forming in precipitation.
Pileus (species calvus only)
Small cap-like cloud over parent cumulonimbus.
Velum
A thin horizontal sheet that forms around the middle of a cumulonimbus.

Genitus mother clouds

Cumulonimbus altocumulogenitus
Cumulonimbus altostratogenitus
Cumulonimbus nimbostratogenitus
Cumulonimbus stratocumulogenitus
Cumulonimbus flammagenitus
Formed by large-scale fires or volcanic eruptions.

Mutatus mother cloud

Cumulonimbus cumulomutatus

==== Genus cumulus: Towering vertical ====
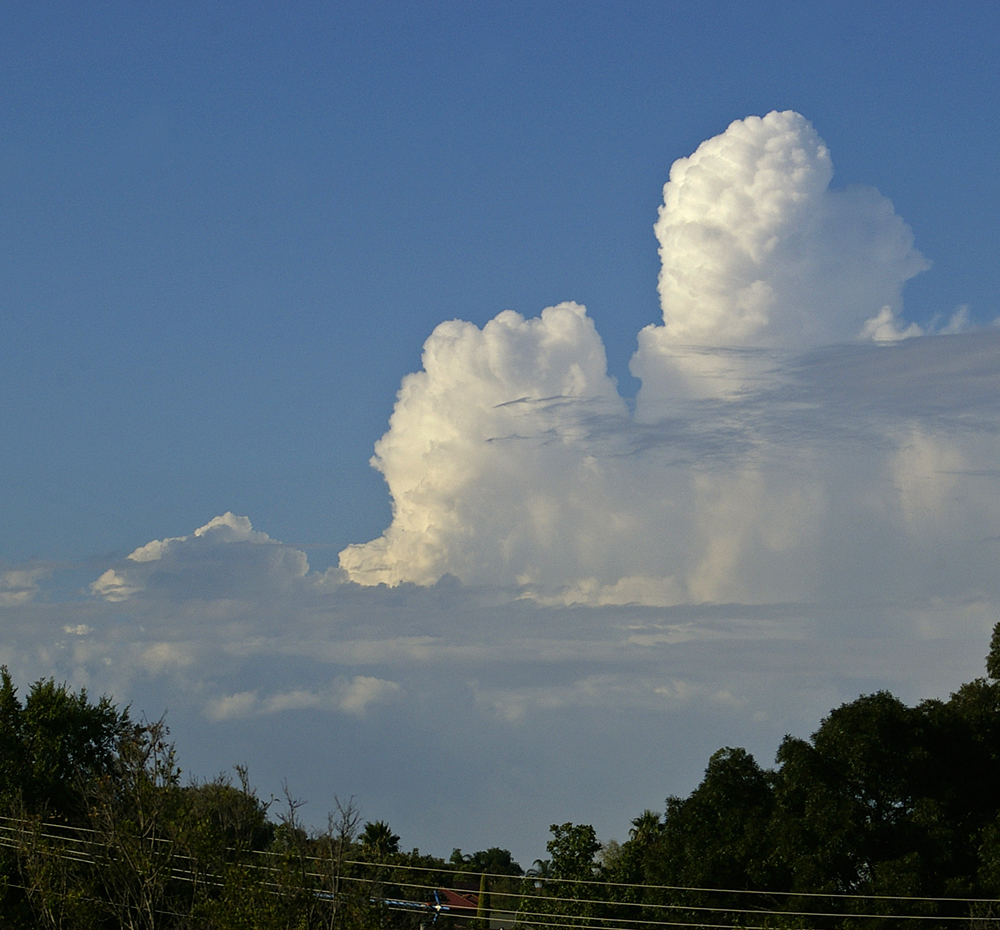
Cumulus congestus

Abbreviations: Cu con (cumulus congestus) or Tcu (towering cumulus)

===== Species =====
Cumulus congestus
These large cumulus clouds have flat dark grey bases and very tall tower-like formations with tops mostly in the high level of the troposphere. The International Civil Aviation Organization (ICAO) designates this species as towering cumulus (Tcu).

===== Varieties =====
Opacity-based varieties
None (always opaque).
Pattern-based variety
None (not generally discerned with highly unstable cumulus congestus).

===== Supplementary features =====
Precipitation-based supplementary features

Virga
Accompanied by precipitation that evaporates before reaching the ground.
Praecipitatio
Produces precipitation that reaches the ground.

Cloud-based supplementary features

Mamma
Downward facing bubble-like protuberances caused by localized downdrafts within the cloud.
Arcus (including roll and shelf clouds)
Low horizontal cloud formation associated with the leading edge of a thunderstorm outflow.
Tuba
Column hanging from the cloud base which can develop into a small funnel cloud.

Accessory clouds

Pannus
Accompanied by a lower layer of fractus species cloud forming in precipitation.
Pileus
Small cap-like cloud over parent cumulus cloud.
Velum
A thin horizontal sheet that forms around the middle of a cumulus cloud.

Mother clouds

Cumulus congestus flammagenitus
Other genitus and mutatus types are the same as for small and moderate cumulus.

=== Multi-level stratiform and moderate vertical cumuliform (low to mid-level cloud base) ===
==== Genus nimbostratus: Multi-level ====
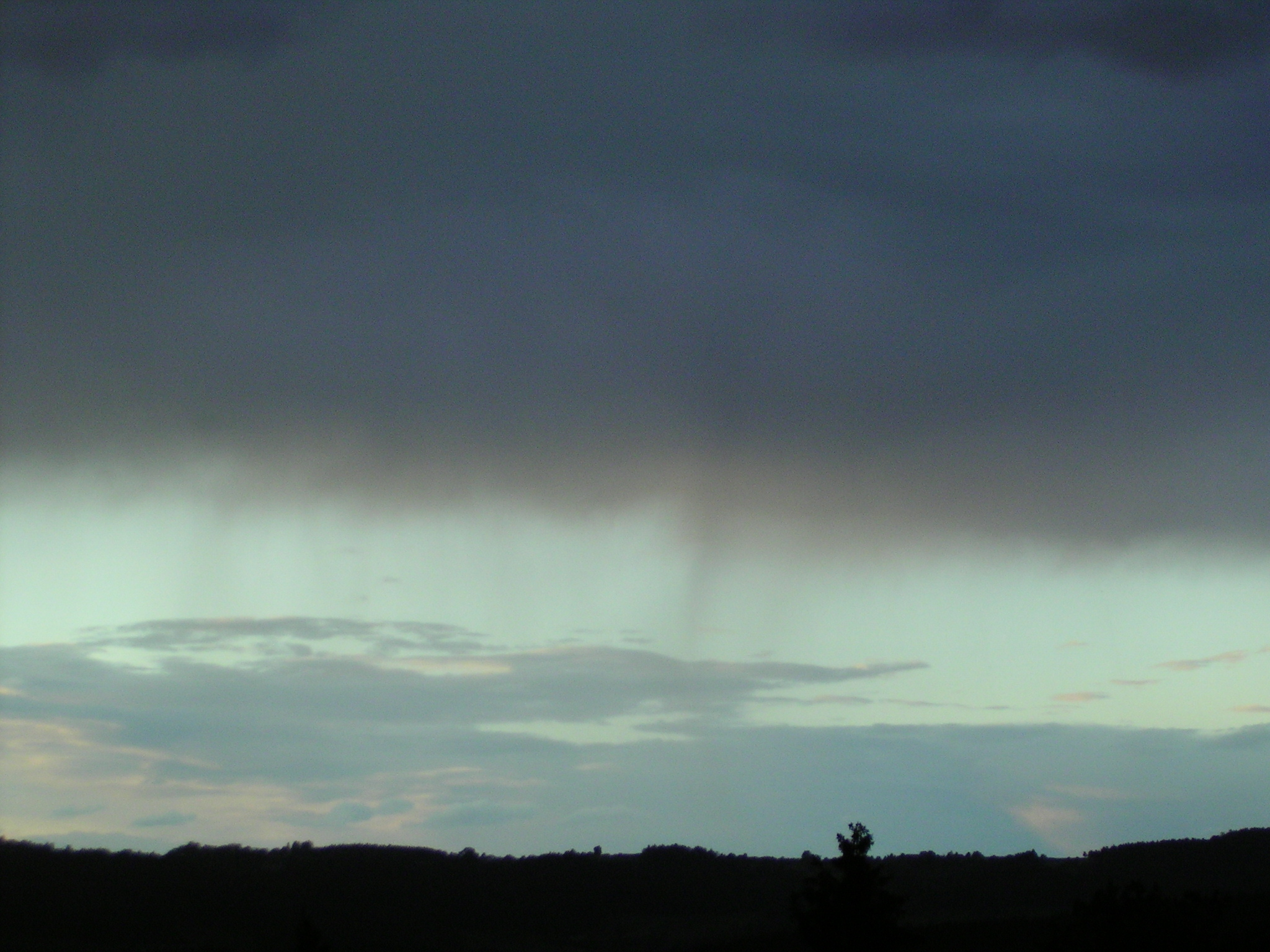
Nimbostratus with virga

Abbreviation: Ns

Clouds of the genus nimbostratus tend to bring constant precipitation and low visibility. This cloud type normally forms above 2 kilometres (6,600 ft) from altostratus cloud but tends to thicken into the lower levels during the occurrence of precipitation. The top of a nimbostratus deck is usually in the middle level of the troposphere.

===== Species =====
No differentiated species (always nebulous).

===== Varieties =====
No varieties (always opaque and never forms in patterns).

===== Supplementary features =====
Precipitation-based supplementary features

Virga
Accompanied by precipitation that evaporates before reaching the ground.
Praecipitatio
Produces precipitation that reaches the ground.

Accessory cloud

Pannus
Nimbostratus with lower layer of fractus species cloud forming in precipitation.

Genitus mother clouds

Nimbostratus cumulogenitus
Nimbostratus cumulonimbogenitus

Mutatus mother clouds

Nimbostratus altostratomutatus
Nimbostratus altocumulomutatus
Nimbostratus stratocumulomutatus

==== Genus cumulus: Moderate vertical ====
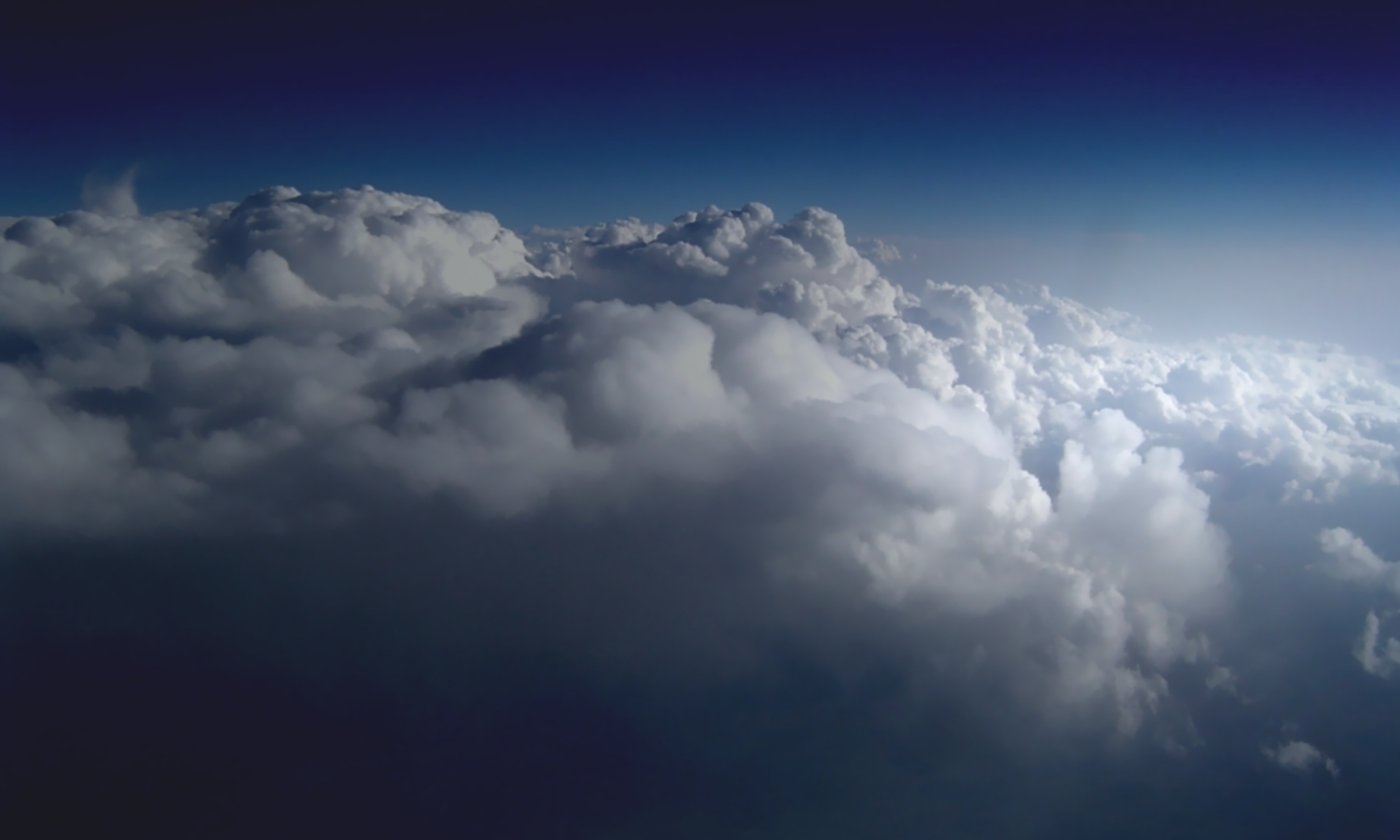
Cumulus mediocris from above

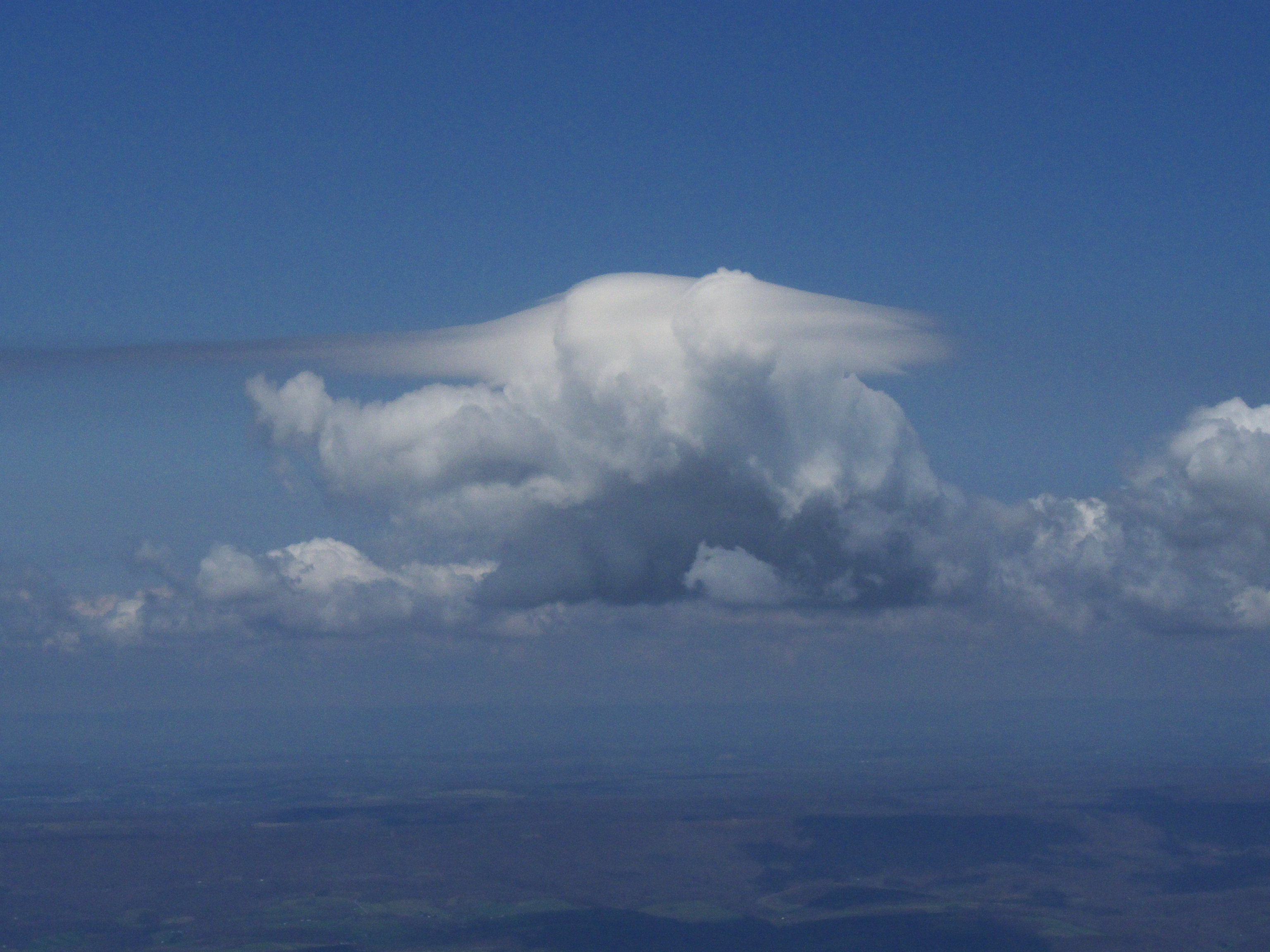
Cumulus mediocris pileus

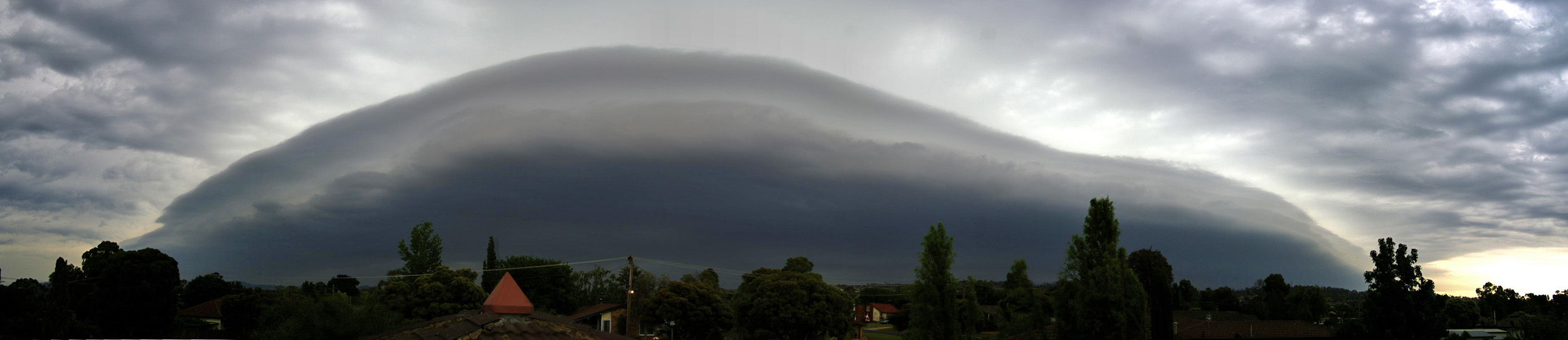
Cumulus congestus arcus

Abbreviation: Cu

Moderate vertical cumulus is the product of free convective air mass instability. Continued upward growth suggests showers later in the day.

===== Species =====
Cumulus mediocris
Moderate vertical clouds with flat medium grey bases and higher tops than cumulus humilis.

===== Varieties =====
Opacity-based varieties: None (always opaque)
Pattern-based variety

Cumulus mediocris radiatus; Moderate cumulus clouds arranged in parallel lines that appear to converge at the horizon.

===== Supplementary features =====
Precipitation-based supplementary features:

Virga
Accompanied by precipitation that evaporates before reaching the ground.
Praecipitatio
Produces precipitation that reaches the ground.

Cloud-based supplementary feature

Mamma
Downward facing bubble-like protuberances caused by localized downdrafts within the cloud.

Accessory clouds

Pileus; Small cap-like cloud over parent cumulus cloud.
Velum
A thin horizontal sheet that forms around the middle of a cumulus cloud.

Mother clouds
Genitus and mutatus types are the same as for cumulus of little vertical extent.

=== Low-level stratocumuliform, cumuliform, and stratiform ===
Low cloud forms from near surface to ca. 2 kilometres (6,600 ft) and are generally composed of water droplets.

==== Genus stratocumulus ====
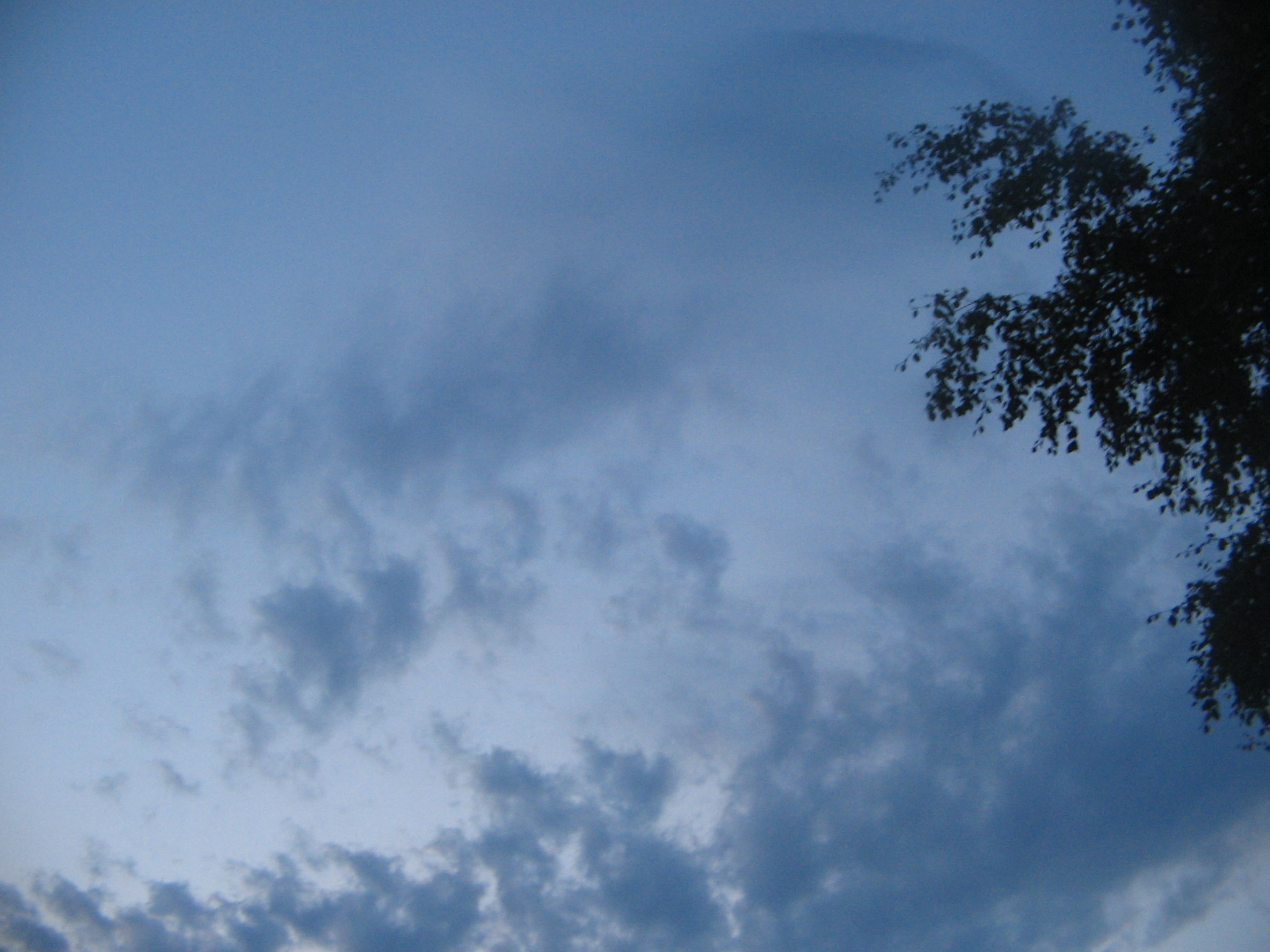
Stratocumulus castellanus

Abbreviation: Sc

Clouds of the genus stratocumulus are lumpy, often forming in slightly unstable air, and they can produce very light rain or drizzle.

===== Species =====
Stratocumulus stratiformis
Always dividable into opacity-based varieties. Sheets or relatively flat patches of stratocumulus
Stratocumulus lenticularis
Lens-shaped low cloud.
Stratocumulus volutus
Elongated, low-level, tube shaped, horizontal stratocumuliform cloud.
Stratocumulus floccus
Scattered or isolated stratocumulus tufts with domed tops and ragged bases.
Stratocumulus castellanus
Layer of turreted stratocumulus cloud with tower-like formations protruding upwards.

===== Varieties =====
Stratocumuliform opacity-based varieties

Stratocumulus stratiformis translucidus
Thin translucent stratocumulus through which the sun or moon can be seen.
Stratocumulus stratiformis perlucidus
Opaque low clouds with translucent breaks.
Stratocumulus stratiformis opacus
Opaque stratocumulus clouds.

Pattern-based variety radiatus
Stratocumulus arranged in parallel bands that appear to converge on the horizon; normally associated with stratiformis species.

Stratocumulus stratiformis translucidus radiatus
Stratocumulus stratiformis perlucidus radiatus
Stratocumulus stratiformis opacus radiatus

Pattern-based variety duplicatus
Closely spaced layers of stratocumulus, one above the other; normally associated with stratiformis and lenticularis species.

Stratocumulus stratiformis translucidus duplicatus
Stratocumulus stratiformis perlucidus duplicatus
Stratocumulus stratiformis opacus duplicatus
Stratocumulus lenticularis duplicatus

Pattern-based variety undulatus
Stratocumulus with wavy undulating base; normally associated with stratiformis and lenticularis species.

Stratocumulus stratiformis translucidus undulatus
Stratocumulus stratiformis perlucidus undulatus
Stratocumulus stratiformis opacus undulatus
Stratocumulus lenticularis undulatus

Pattern-based variety lacunosus
Sc with circular holes caused by localized downdrafts; normally associated with stratiformis and castellanus species.

Stratocumulus stratiformis translucidus lacunosus
Stratocumulus stratiformis perlucidus lacunosus
Stratocumulus stratiformis opacus lacunosus
Stratocumulus castellanus lacunosus
Stratocumulus floccus lacunosus

===== Supplementary features =====
Precipitation-based supplementary features
Usually associated with species stratiformis and castellanus.

Virga
Low cloud producing precipitation that evaporates before reaching the ground.
Praecipitatio
Stratocumulus clouds producing precipitation that reaches the ground.

Cloud-based supplementary feature

Mamma
Stratocumulus with bubble-like protrusions on the underside; usually associated with species castellanus.

Genitus mother clouds

Stratocumulus cumulogenitus

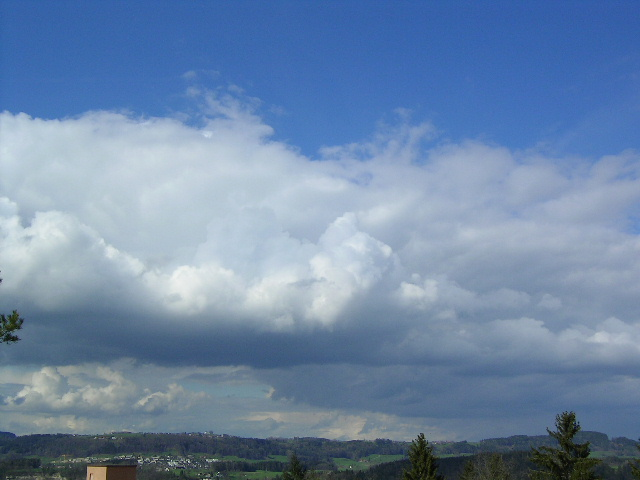
Stratocumulus cumulogenitus with higher layer of altocumulus stratiformis

Stratocumulus nimbostratogenitus
Stratocumulus cumulonimbogenitus
Stratocumulus altostratogenitus

Mutatus mother clouds

Stratocumulus nimbostratomutatus
Stratocumulus altocumulomutatus
Stratocumulus stratomutatus

==== Genus cumulus (little vertical extent) ====
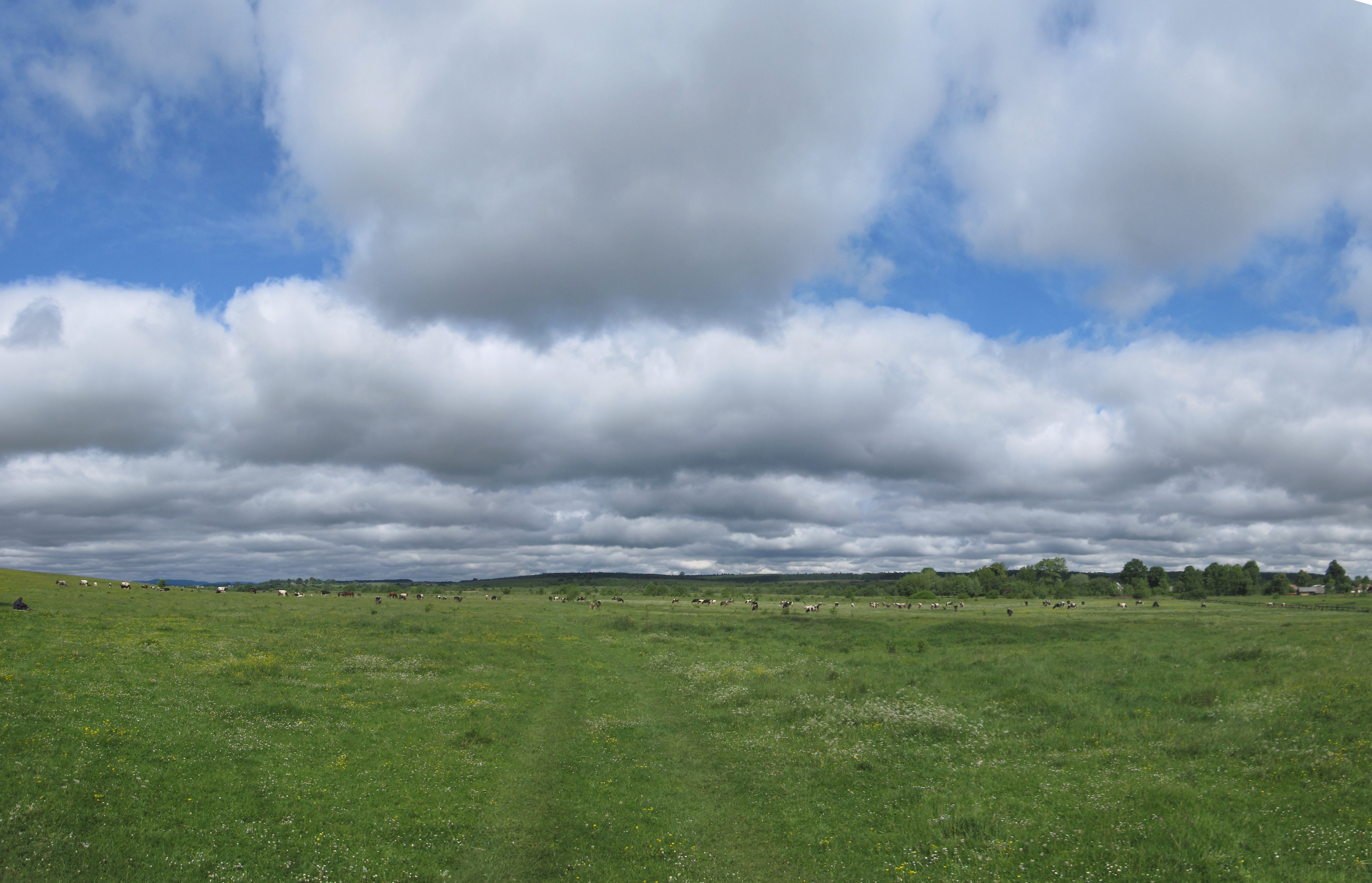
Cumulus humilis

Abbreviation: Cu

These are fair weather cumuliform clouds of limited convection that do not grow vertically. The vertical height from base to top is generally less than the width of the cloud base. They appear similar to stratocumulus but the elements are generally more detached and less wide at the base.

===== Species =====
Cumulus fractus
Ragged shreds of cumulus clouds.
Cumulus humilis
"Fair weather clouds" with flat light grey bases and small white domed tops.

===== Varieties =====
Opacity-based varieties
None (always opaque except species fractus which is always translucent).
Humilis pattern-based variety

Cumulus humilis radiatus
Small cumulus clouds arranged in parallel lines that appear to converge at the horizon.

===== Supplementary features and accessory clouds =====
Not commonly seen with cumulus fractus or humilis.

Genitus mother clouds

Cumulus stratocumulogenitus
Cumulus homogenitus
Clouds formed by air-mass convection associated with contained industrial activity.

Mutatus mother clouds

Cumulus stratocumulomutatus
Cumulus stratomutatus

Cumulus cataractagenitus
Generated by the spray from waterfalls.

==== Genus stratus ====
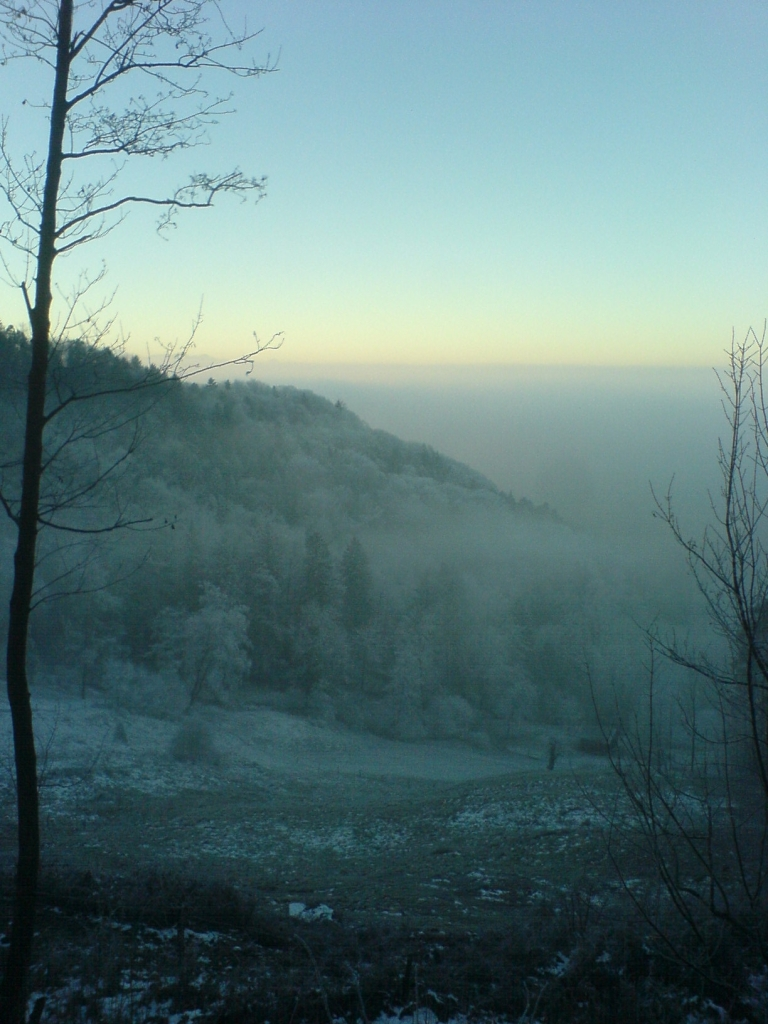
At level with stratus nebulosus translucidus and opacus clouds

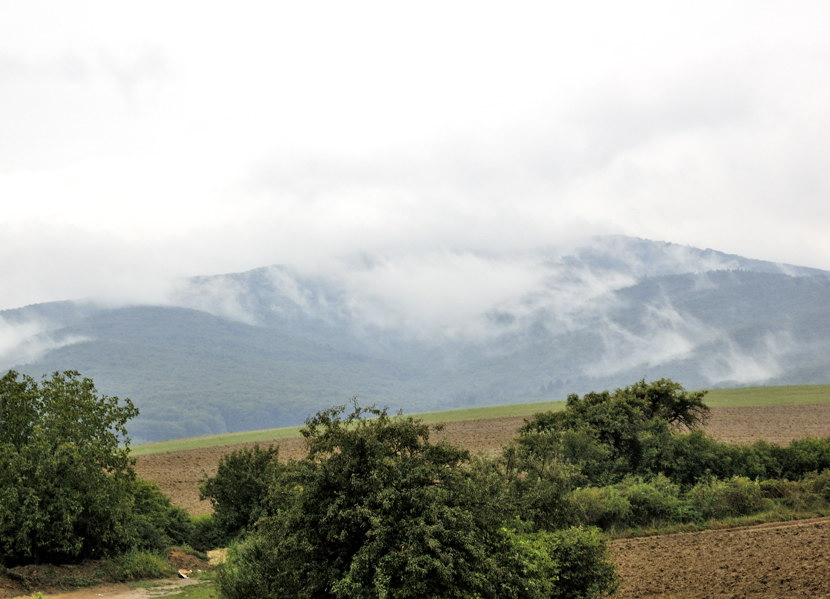
Stratus fractus cloud

Abbreviation: St

Clouds of the genus stratus form in low horizontal layers having a ragged or uniform base. Ragged stratus often forms in precipitation while more uniform stratus forms in maritime or other moist stable air mass conditions. The latter often produces drizzle. Stratus that touches the Earth's surface is given the common name, fog, rather than a Latin name that applies only to clouds that form and remain aloft in the troposphere.

===== Species =====
Stratus nebulosus
Uniform fog-like low cloud.
Stratus fractus
Ragged shreds of stratus clouds usually under base of precipitation clouds.

===== Varieties =====
Nebulosus opacity-based varieties

Stratus nebulosus translucidus
Thin translucent stratus.
Stratus nebulosus opacus
Opaque stratus that obscures the sun or moon.

Pattern-based variety undulatus
Wavy undulating base.

Stratus nebulosus translucidus undulatus
Stratus nebulosus opacus undulatus

Varieties are not commonly associated with St species fractus.

===== Supplementary features =====
Precipitation-based supplementary feature

Praecipitatio
Stratus (usually species nebulosus) producing precipitation.

Accessory clouds
Not usually seen with stratus.
Genitus mother clouds and other mother sources

Stratus nimbostratogenitus
Stratus cumulogenitus
Stratus cumulonimbogenitus
Stratus cataractagenitus
Generated by the spray from waterfalls.
Stratus silvagenitus
A stratus cloud that forms as water vapor is added to the air above a forest.
Stratus homogenitus

Mutatus mother cloud

Stratus stratocumulomutatus

== Tropospheric cloud types with Latin etymologies where applicable ==
Cloud types are sorted in alphabetical order except where noted.

=== WMO genera ===
Altocumulus (altus and cumulus)
Latin for "high heap": Applied to mid-level stratocumuliform.
Altostratus (altus and stratus)
"High sheet": Applied to mid-level stratiform.
Cirrocumulus (cirrus and cumulus)
"Hair-like heap": Applied to high-level stratocumuliform.
Cirrostratus (cirrus and stratus)
"Hair-like sheet": Applied to high-level stratiform.
Cirrus
"Hair-like": Applied to high-level cirriform.
Cumulonimbus (cumulus and nimbus)
"Precipitation-bearing heap": Applied to vertical/multi-level cumulonimbiform.
Cumulus
"Heap": Applied to low-level and vertical/multi-level cumuliform.
Nimbostratus (nimbus and stratus)
"Precipitation-bearing sheet": Applied to multi-level stratiform with vertical extent that produces precipitation of significant intensity.
Stratocumulus (stratus and cumulus)
"Sheet-like heap": Applied to low-level stratocumuliform.
Stratus
"Sheet": Applied to low-level mostly shallow stratiform.

=== WMO species ===
Castellanus (Cas)
Latin for "castle-like": Applies to stratocumuliform (Sc cas, Ac cas, Cc cas) and dense cirriform (Ci cas) with a series of turret shapes – indicates air mass instability.
Congestus (Con)
Latin for "congested": Applies to cumuliform (Cu con/Tcu) with great vertical development and heaped into cauliflower shapes – indicates considerable air mass instability and strong upcurrents.
Fibratus (Fib)
"Fibrous": Cirriform (Ci fib) or high stratiform (Cs fib) in the form of filaments, can be straight or slightly curved; indicates strong, continuous upper winds.
Floccus (Flo)
"Tufted": Applies to stratocumuliform (Sc flo, Ac flo, Cc flo) and high cirriform (Ci flo); indicates some mid or high-level instability.
Fractus (Fra)
"Broken": Low stratiform (St fra) or cumuliform (Cu fra) with an irregular shredded appearance – forms in precipitation and/or gusty winds.
Humilis (Hum)
"Small": Applies to cumuliform (Cu hum) with little vertical extent; indicates relatively slight air mass instability.
Lenticularis (Len)
"Lens–like": Stratocumuliform (Sc len, Ac len, Cc len) having a lens-like appearance – formed by standing waves of wind passing over mountains or hills.

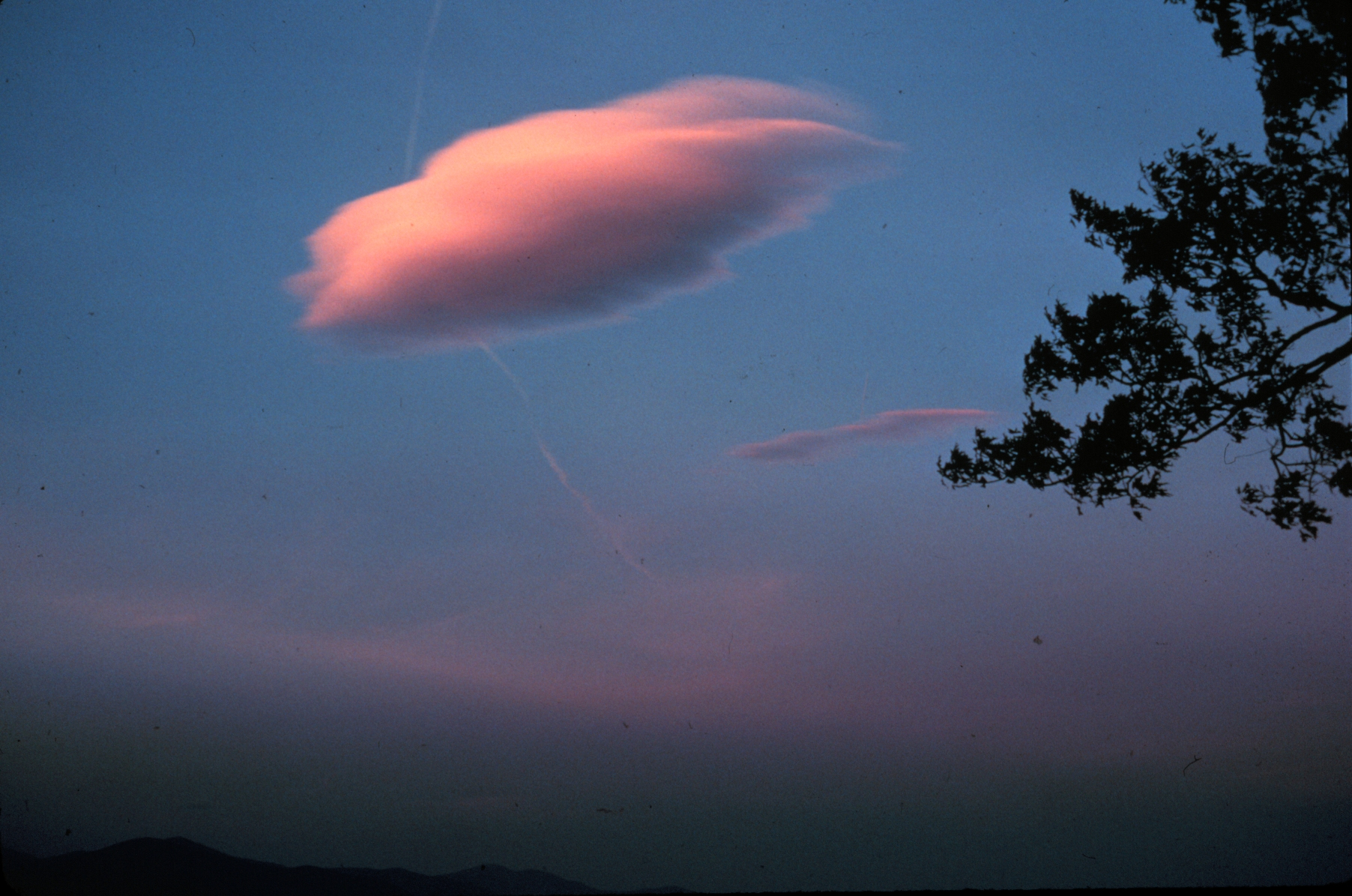
A translucent wave cloud - altocumulus lenticularis

Mediocris (Med)
"Medium-size": Cumuliform (Cu med) with moderate vertical extent; indicates moderate instability and upcurrents.
Nebulosus (Neb)
"Nebulous": Indistinct low and high stratiform (St neb, Cs neb) without features; indicates light wind if any and stable air mass.
Spissatus (Spi)
"Dense": Thick cirriform (Ci spi) with a grey appearance; indicates some upward movement of air in the upper troposphere.
Stratiformis (Str)
"Sheet-like": Horizontal cloud sheet of flattened stratocumuliform (Sc str, Ac str, Cc str); indicates very slight air mass instability.
Uncinus (Unc)
"Hook-like": Cirriform (Ci unc) with a hook shape at the top; indicates a nearby backside of a weather system.
Volutus (Vol)
"Rolled": Elongated, low or mid-level, tube shaped, stratocumuliform (Sc vol, Ac vol).

The division of genus types into species is as shown in the following table. The genus types (including some cumulus sub-types) are arranged from top to bottom in the left column in approximate descending order of average overall altitude range. The species are sorted from left to right in approximate ascending order of instability or vertical extent of the forms to which each belongs:

1. Stratiform species,
2. Cirriform species,
3. Stratocumuliform species,
4. Cumuliform species,
5. Cumulonimbiform species.

These ordinal instability numbers appear in each box where a particular genus has a particular species.

Level	Species (L-R)	Abbrev.		Neb	Fib	Unc	Spi	Str	Len	Vol	Flo	Cas	Fra	Hum	Med	Con	Cal	Cap
Level	Genus name	Species name L-R	(no species)	Nebulosus	Fibratus	Uncinus	Spissatus	Stratiformis	Lenticularis	Volutus	Floccus	Castellanus	Fractus	Humilis	Mediocris	Congestus	Calvus	Capillatus
High	Cirrus	Ci			(2)	(2)	(2)				(2)	(2)						
High	Cirrocumulus	Cc						(3)	(3)		(3)	(3)						
High	Cirrostratus	Cs		(1)	(1)													
Middle	Altocumulus	Ac						(3)	(3)	(3)	(3)	(3)						
Middle	Altostratus	As	(1)															
Towering vertical	Cumulonimbus (5)	Cb															(5)	(5)
Towering vertical	Cumulus congestus	Cu con or Tcu														(4)		
Moderate vertical	Nimbostratus	Ns	(1)															
Moderate vertical	Cumulus mediocris	Cu med													(4)			
Low	Stratocumulus	Sc						(3)	(3)	(3)	(3)	(3)						
Low	Cumulus humilis	Cu hum											(4)	(4)				
Low	Stratus	St		(1)									(1)					

=== WMO varieties ===
Opacity-based

Opacus
Latin for "Opaque". A thick sheet of stratiform or stratocumuliform cloud.
Perlucidus
"Semi-transparent". Sheet of stratocumuliform cloud with small spaces between elements.
Translucidus
"Translucent". Thin translucent patch or sheet of stratiform or stratocumuliform.

Pattern-based

Duplicatus
Latin for "Double". Closely spaced often partly merged layers of cloud in one of several possible forms.
Intortus
"Twisted". Curved and tangled cirriform.
Lacunosus
"Full of holes". Thin stratocumuliform cloud distinguished by holes and ragged edges.
Radiatus
"Radial". Clouds in one of several possible forms arranged in parallel lines that appear to converge at a central point near the horizon.
Undulatus
"Wavy". Stratiform or stratocumuliform cloud displaying an undulating pattern.
Vertebratus
"In the form of a back-bone". Cirriform arranged to look like the back-bone of a vertebrate.

The following table shows the cloud varieties arranged across the top of the chart from left to right in approximate descending order of frequency of appearance. The genus types and some sub-types associated with each variety are sorted in the left column from top to bottom in approximate descending order of average overall altitude range. Where applicable, the genera and varieties are cross-classified to show the species normally associated with each combination of genus and variety. The exceptions comprise the following: Altostratus that have varieties but no species so the applicable boxes are marked without specific species names; cumulus congestus, a species that has its own altitude characteristic but no varieties; cumulonimbus that have species but no varieties, and nimbostratus that has no species or varieties. The boxes for genus and species combinations that have no varieties are left blank.

Level	Name	Abbrev.	Tra	Per	Opa	Dup	Und	Rad	Lac	Int	Ver
Level	Name	Abbrev.	Translucidus	Perlucidus	Opacus	Duplicatus	Undulatus	Radiatus	Lacunosus	Intortus	Vertebratus
High	Cirrus	Ci				Fib; Unc		Fib; Unc		Fib	Fib
High	Cirrocumulus	Cc					Str; Len		Str, Cas; Flo		
High	Cirrostratus	Cs				Fib	Fib				
Middle	Altocumulus	Ac	Str	Str	Str	Str; Len	Str; Len	Str	Str, Cas; Flo		
Middle	Altostratus	As	+		+	+	+	+			
Towering vertical	Cumulonimbus	Cb									
Towering vertical	Cumulus congestus	Cu con or Tcu									
Moderate vertical	Nimbostratus	Ns									
Moderate vertical	Cumulus mediocris	Cu med						Med			
Low	Stratocumulus	Sc	Str	Str	Str	Str; Len	Str; Len	Str	Str, Cas; Flo		
Low	Cumulus humilis	Cu hum						Hum			
Low	Stratus	St	Neb		Neb		Neb				

=== WMO supplementary features ===
Precipitation-based supplementary features

Praecipitatio
Latin for "falling": Cloud whose precipitation reaches the ground.

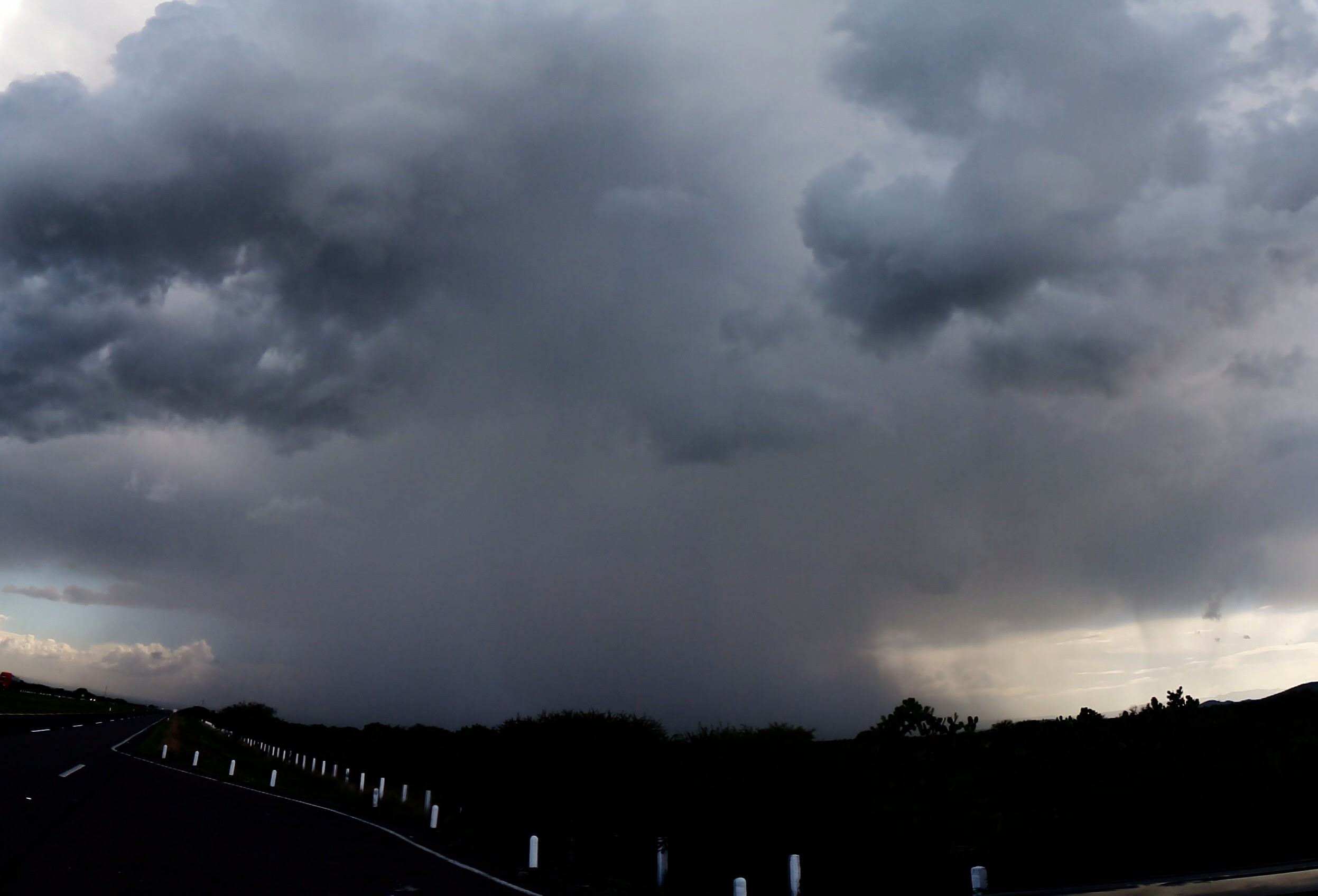
Cumulonimbus praecipitatio

Virga
"Twig" or "branch": Cloud whose precipitation evaporates before reaching the ground.

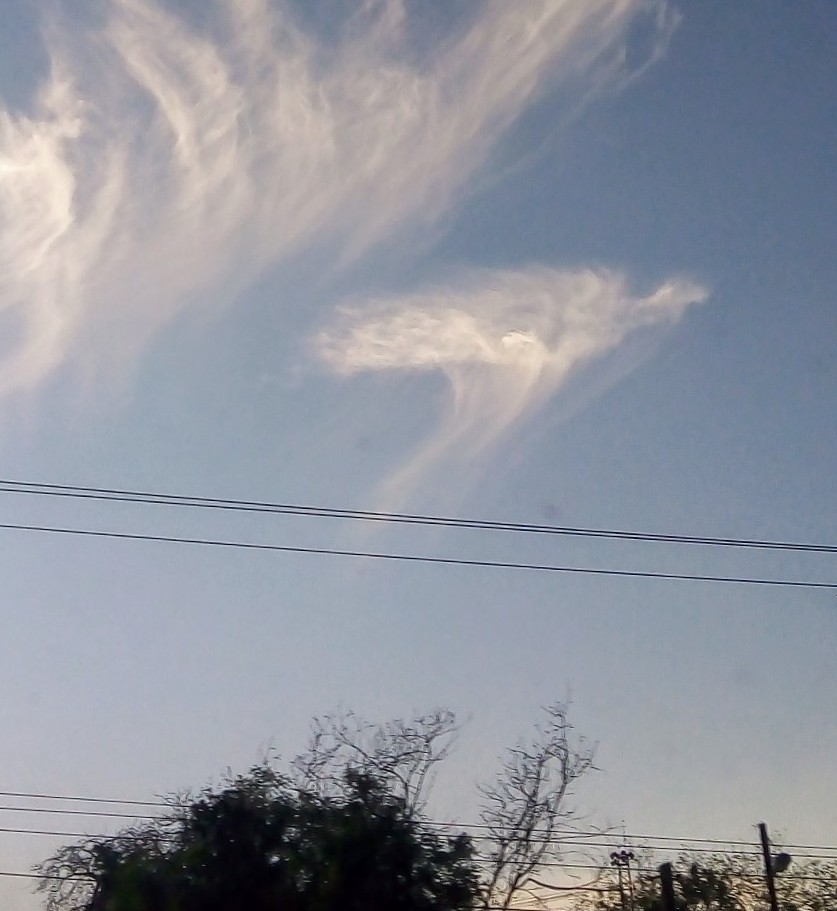
Cirrocumulus virga

Cloud-based supplementary features

Arcus
Latin for "arch" or "bow": Feature mostly attached to cumulus, thick with ragged edges.

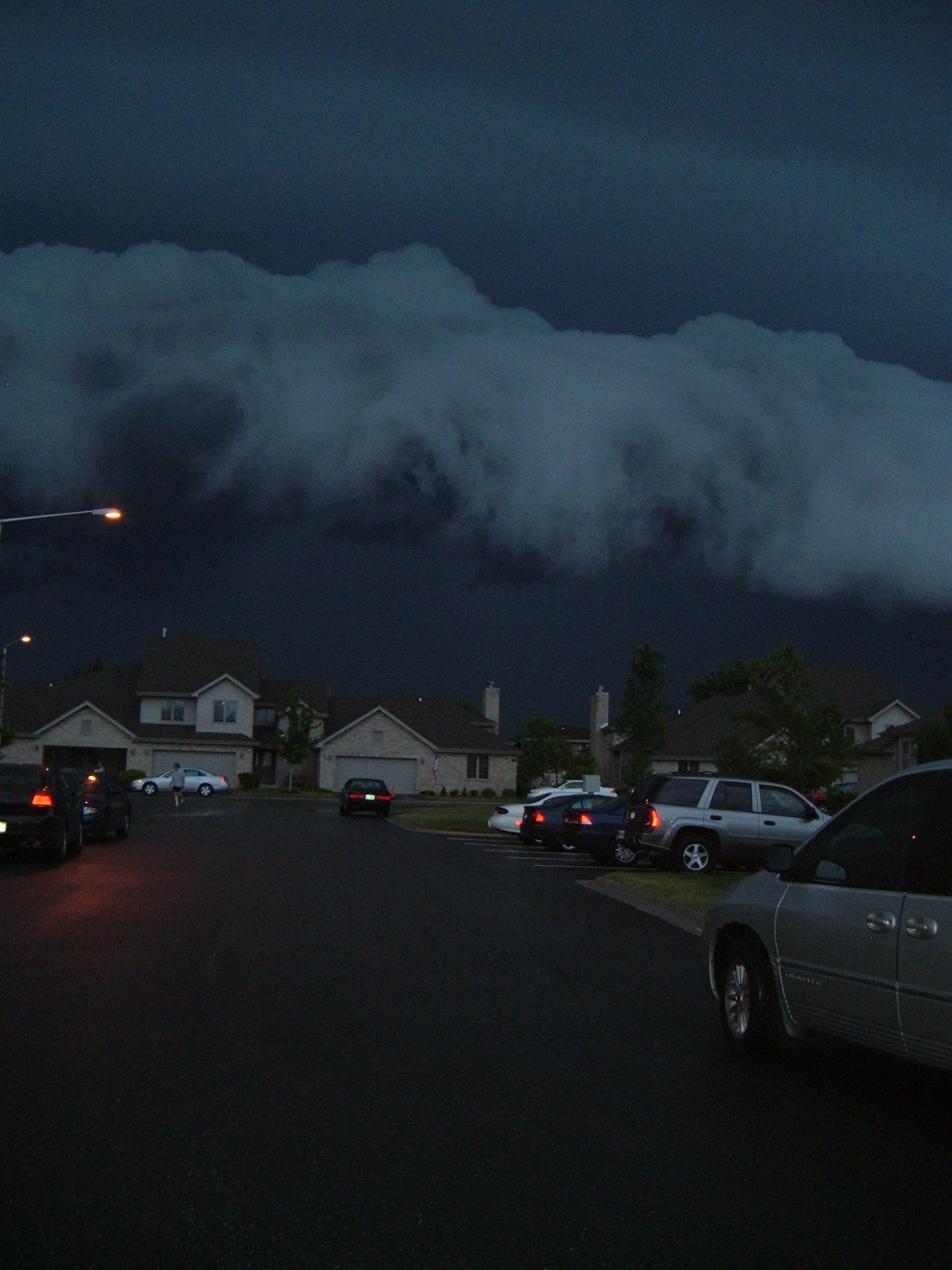
Cumulonimbus arcus

Asperitas
"Roughness": A highly disturbed and chaotic wave feature occasionally seen with a stratocumulus or altocumulus cloud.

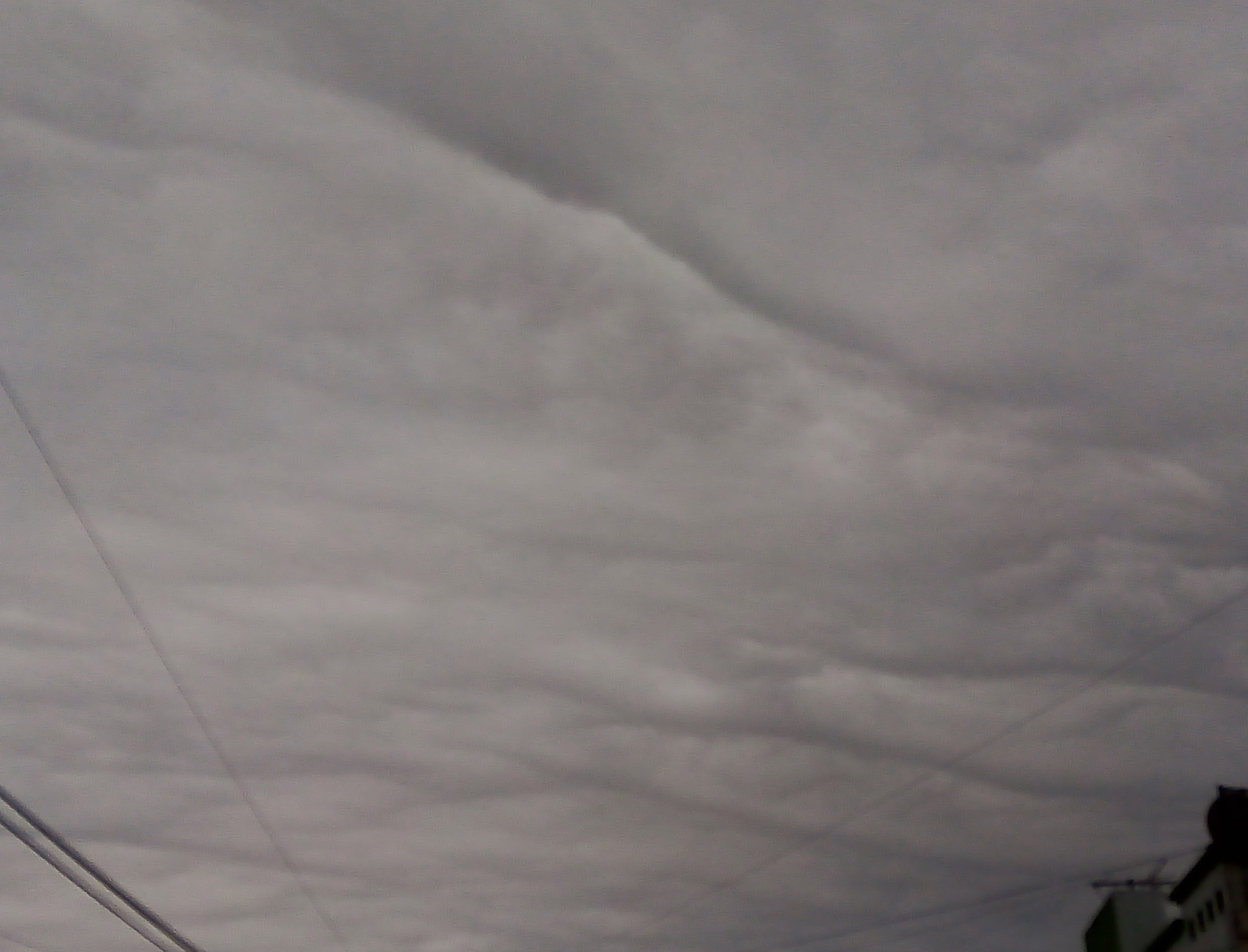
Stratocumulus undulatus asperitas

Cavum
"Hole": Supercooled altocumulus or cirrocumulus distinguished by a hole with ragged edges and virga or wisps of cirrus.

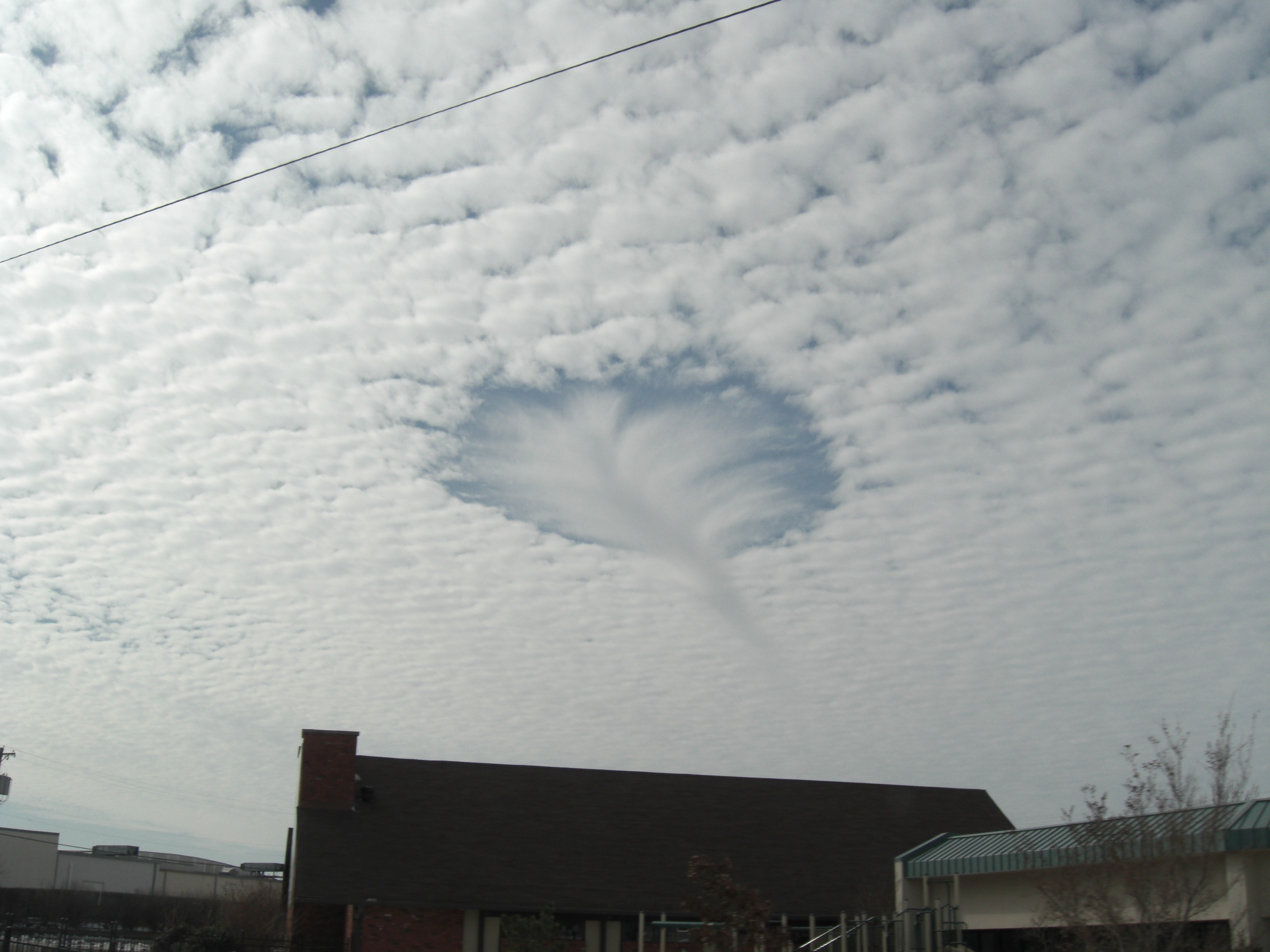
Altocumulus cavum

Cauda
"Tail": A tail cloud that extends horizontally away from the murus cloud and is the result of air feeding into the storm.

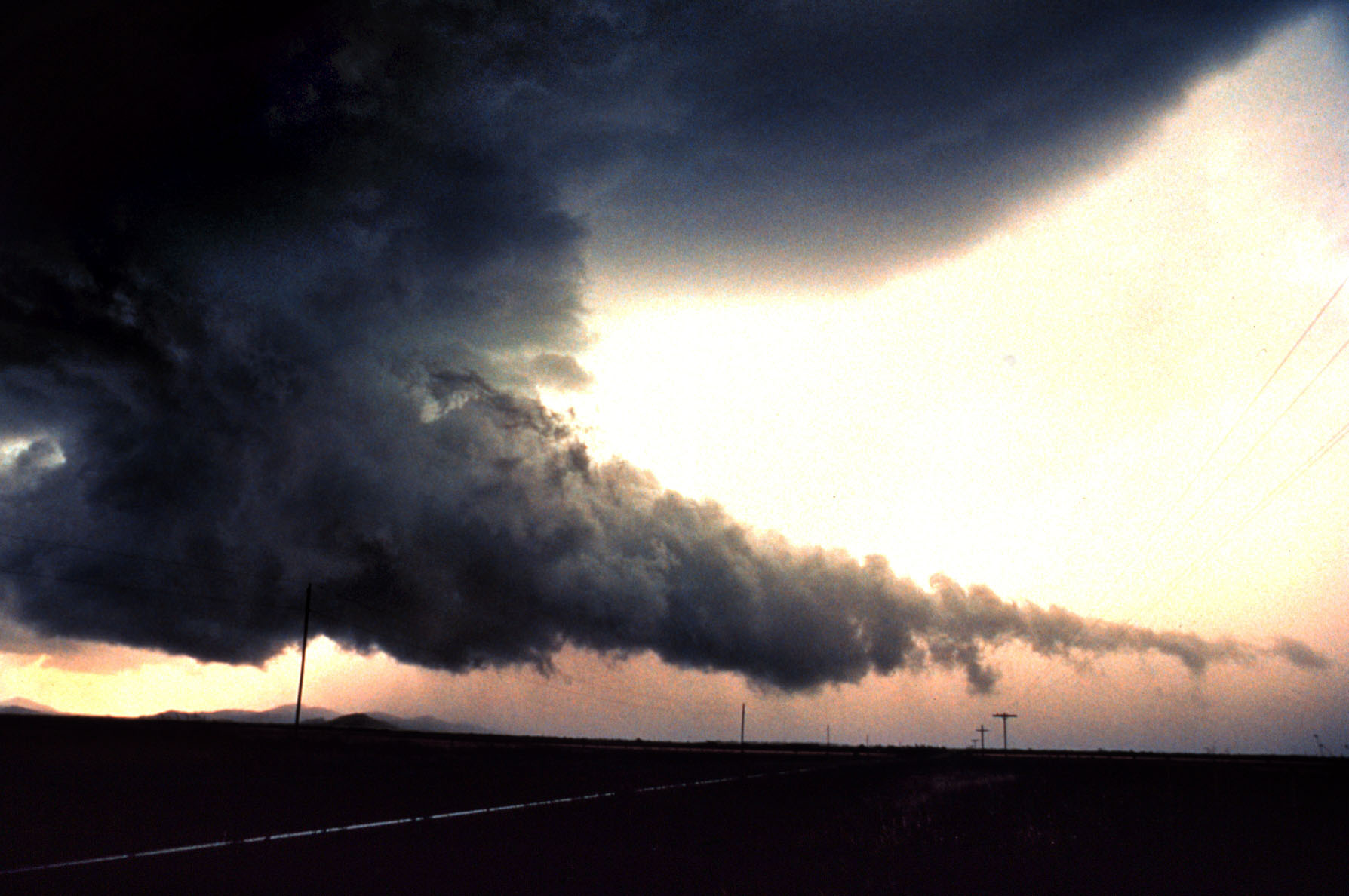
Cumulonimbus murus cauda

Fluctus
Crested wave-like stratocumulus, altocumulus, or cirrus cloud formed by wind-shear.

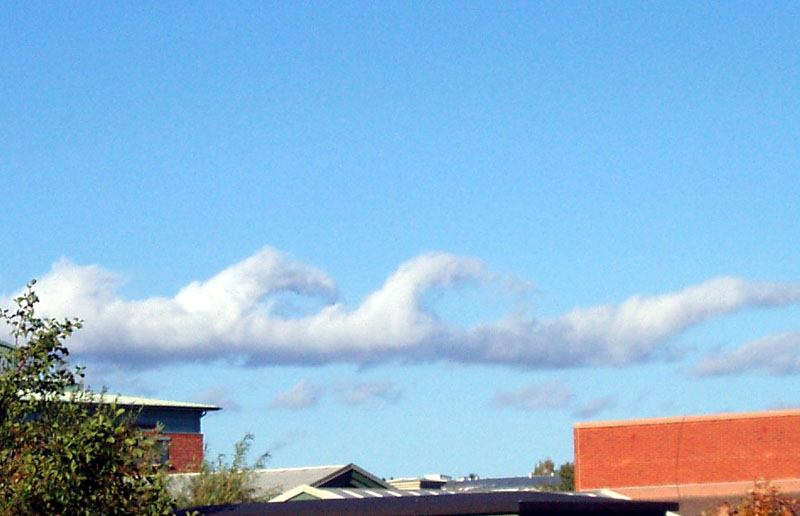
Stratocumulus fluctus

Incus
"Anvil": Top part of a mature cumulonimbus cloud; anvil-shaped feature.

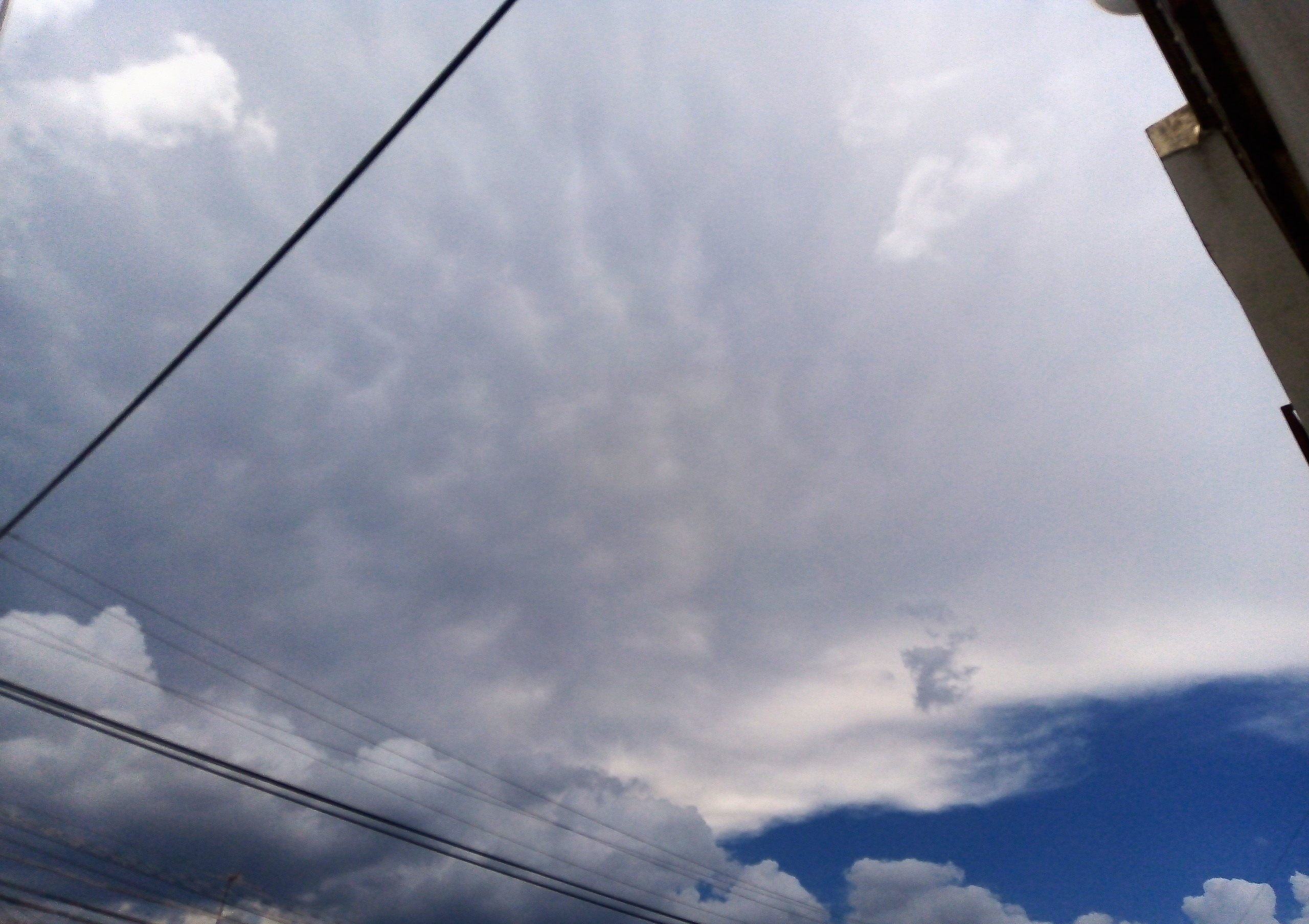
Cumulonimbus incus mamma

Mammatus
WMO term mamma: "Breast": A feature in the form of round pouches on under-surface of a cloud.

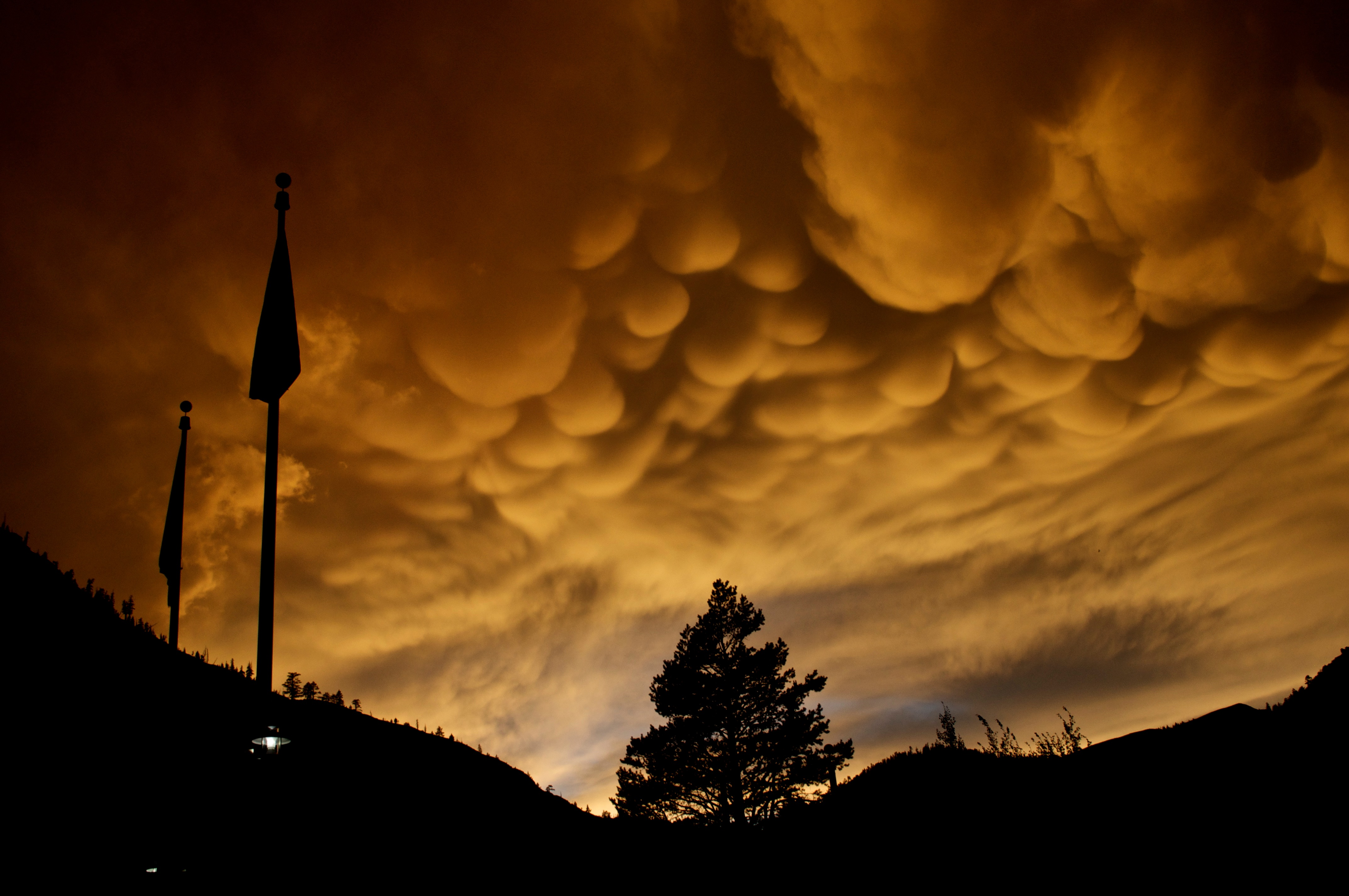
Mammatus over Squaw Valley

Murus
"Wall": Cumulonimbus wall cloud with a lowering rotating base that can portend tornadoes.

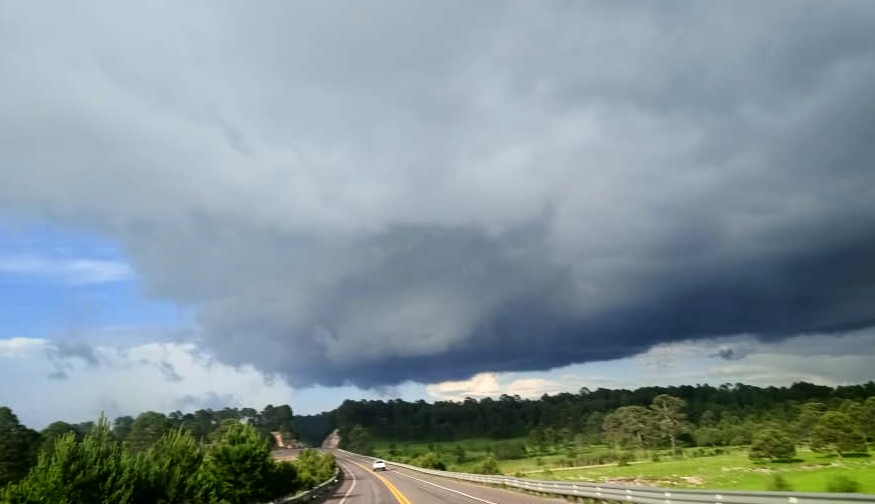
Cumulonimbus murus

Tuba
"Funnel" or "tube": Feature in the form of a column hanging from the bottom of cumulus or cumulonimbus.

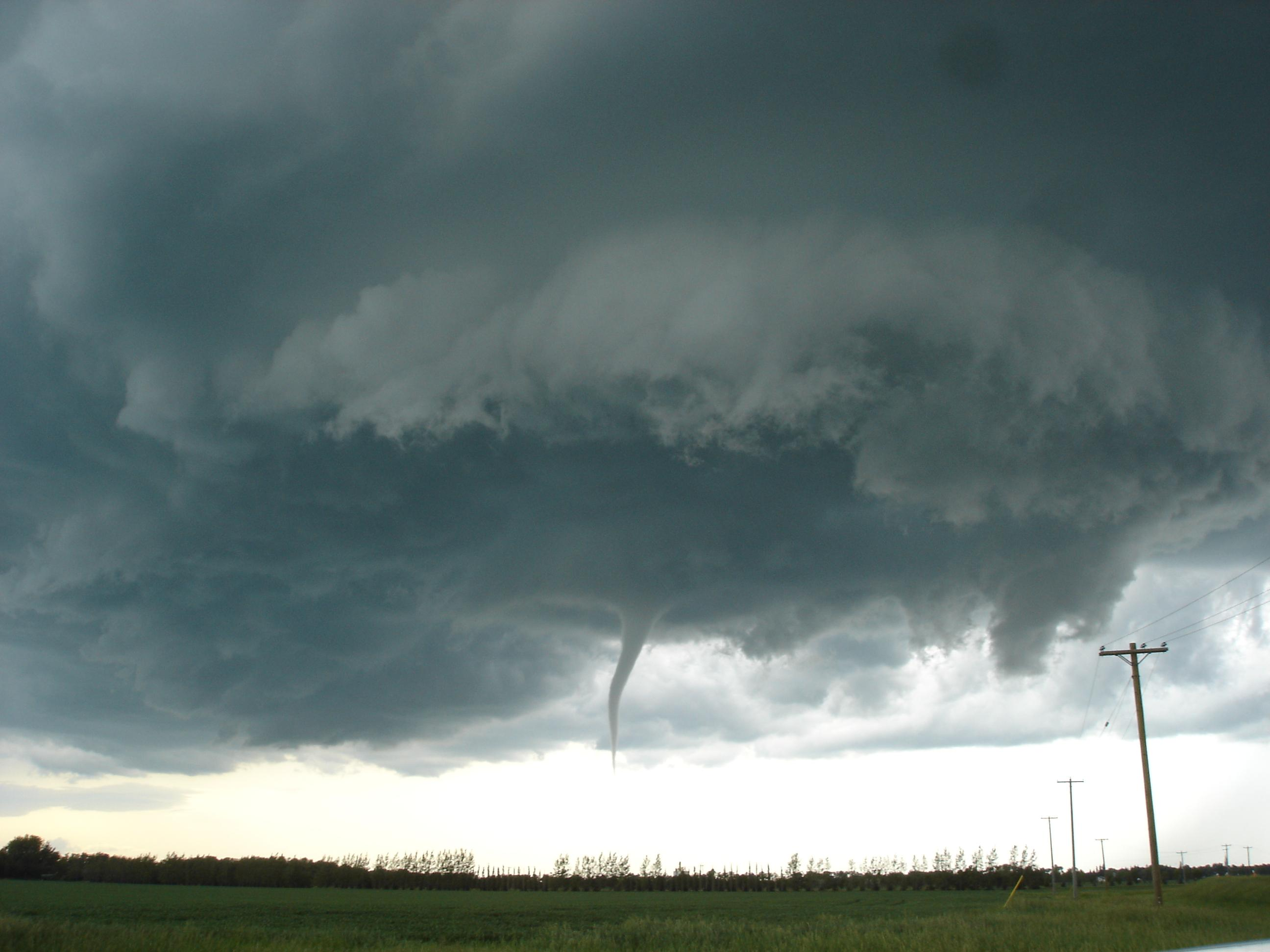
Cumulonimbus tuba

Accessory clouds

Pannus
Latin for "shredded cloth": A ragged or shredded accessory cloud that forms in precipitation below the main cloud.

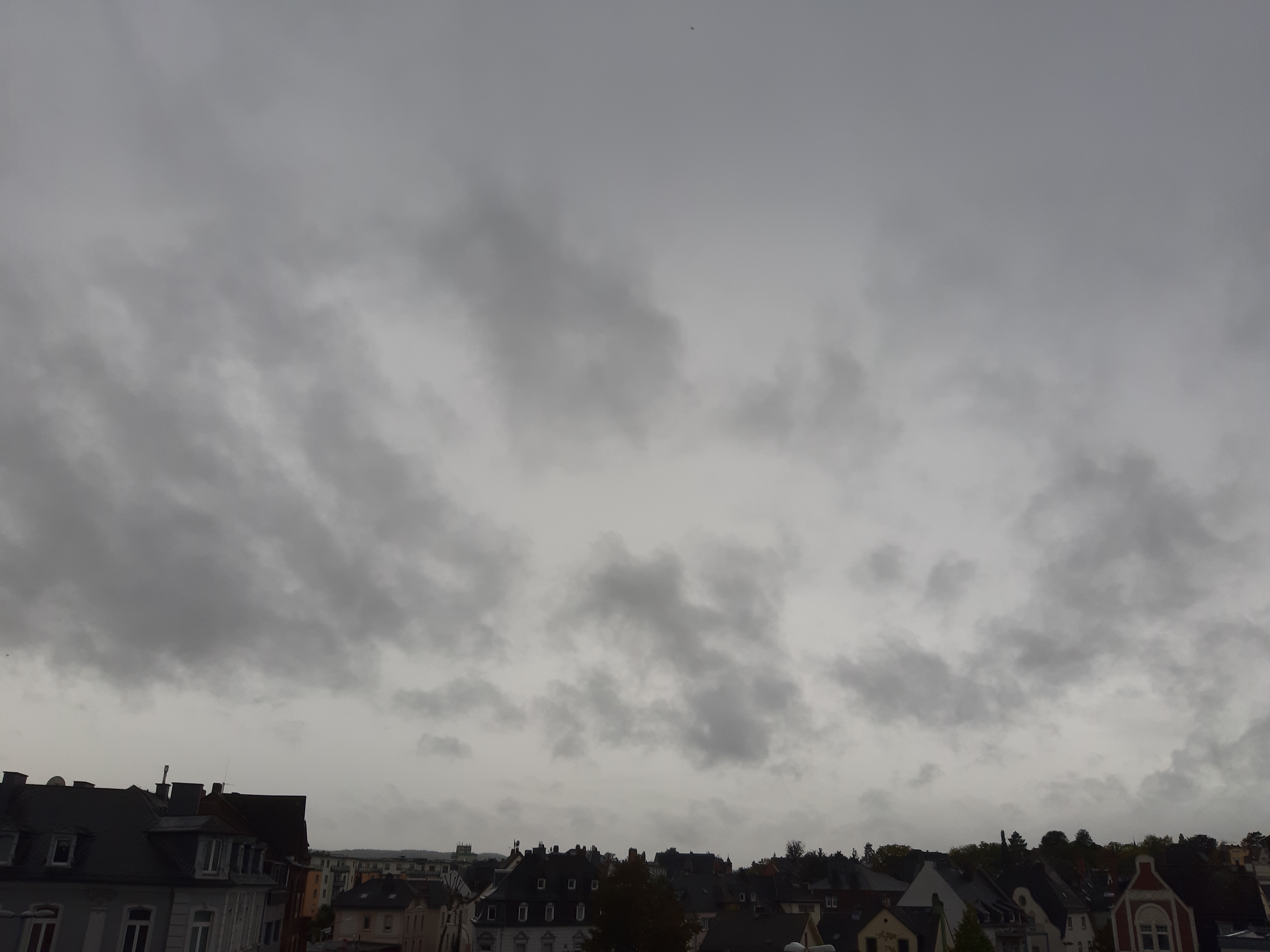
Nimbostratus pannus

Pileus
"Capped": A hood-shaped accessory cloud.

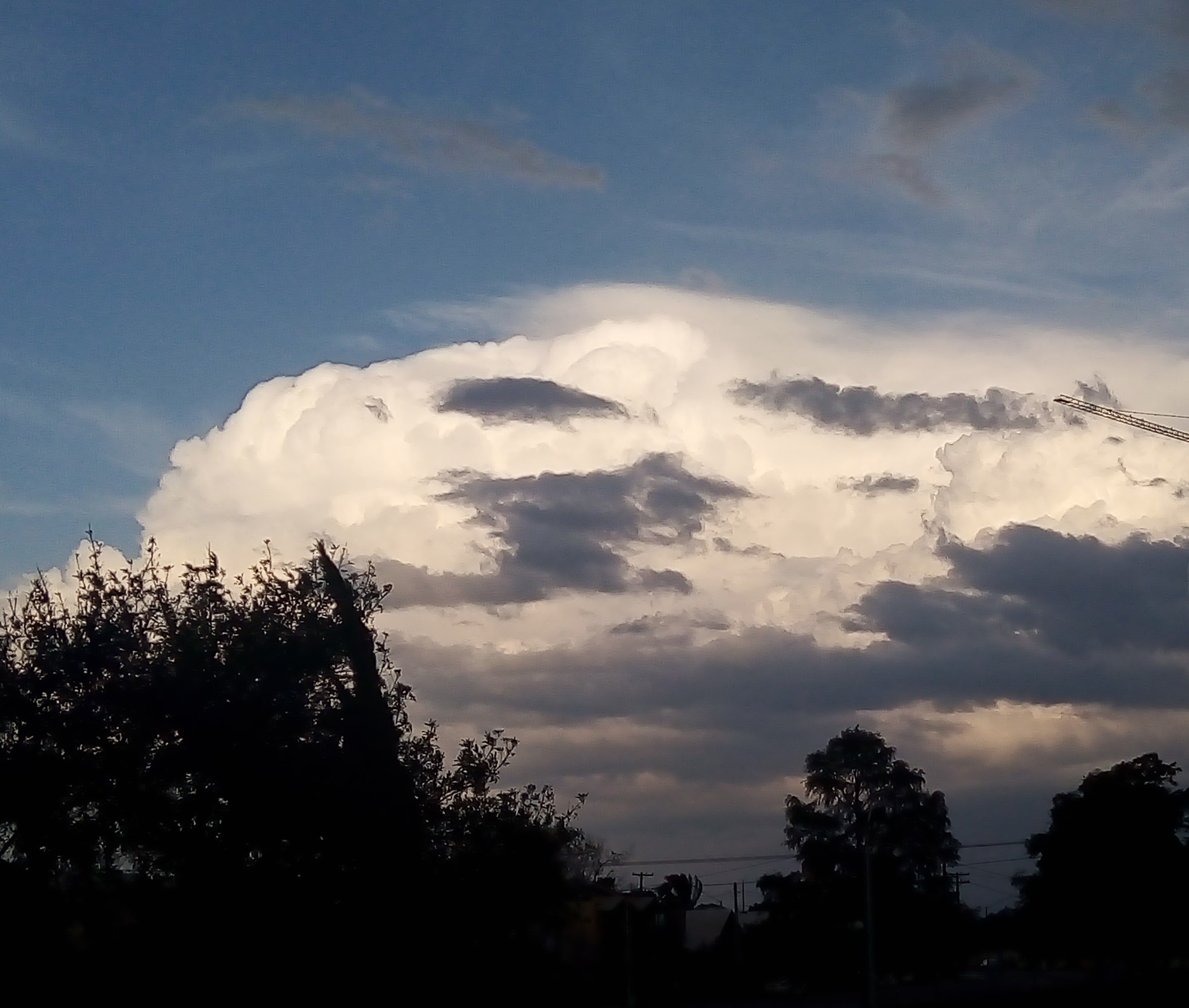
Cumulonimbus pileus

Velum
"A ship's sail": An accessory cloud in the form of a sail.

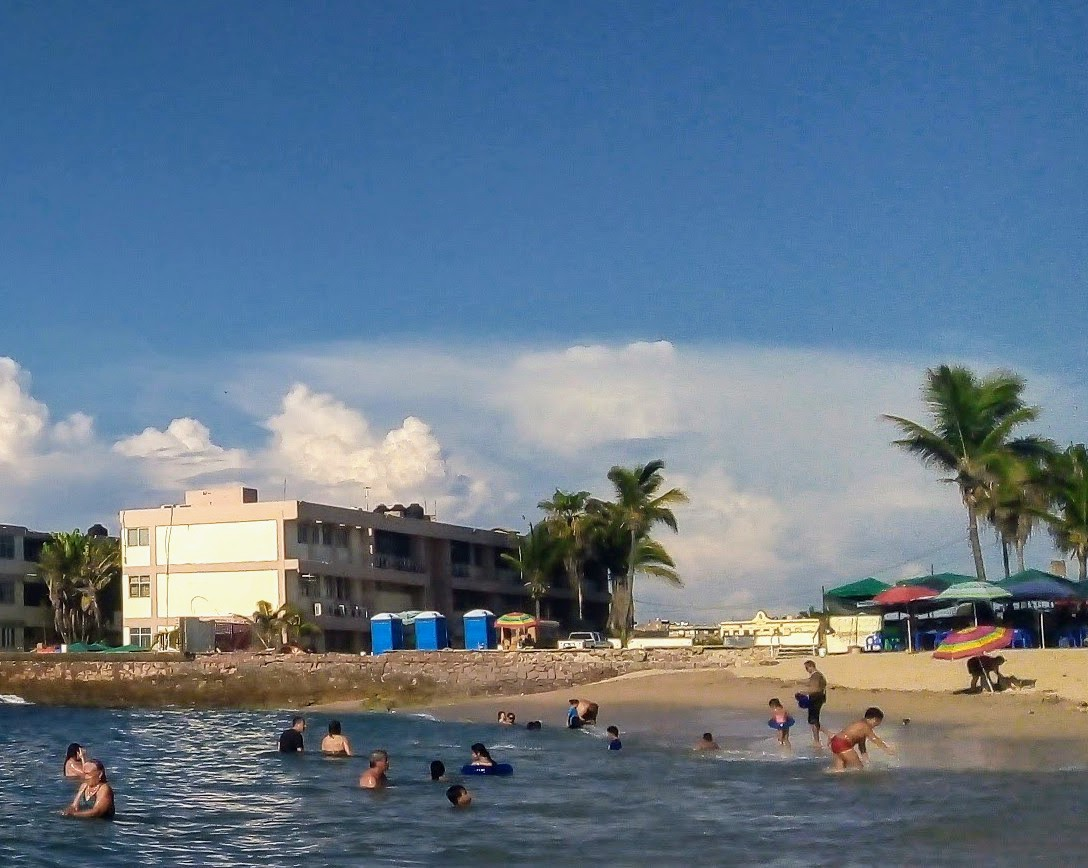
Cumulonimbus velum

The supplementary features are associated with particular genera as follows. They are sorted from left to right in approximate decreasing order of frequency of occurrence for each of three categories. The genus types and some sub-types are arranged from top to bottom in approximate descending order of average overall altitude range. Each box is marked where a particular genus or sub-type has a particular supplementary feature.

Level	Name	Class	Precipitation-based		Cloud-based				Accessory cloud		
Level	Name	Abbrev.	Virga	Praecipitatio	Incus	Mamma	Arcus	Tuba	Pannus	Pileus	Velum
High	Cirrus	Ci				+					
High	Cirrocumulus	Cc	+			+					
High	Cirrostratus	Cs									
Middle	Altocumulus	Ac	+			+					
Middle	Altostratus	As	+	+		+			+		
Towering vertical	Cumulonimbus	Cb	+	+	+	+	+	+	+	+	+
Towering vertical	Cumulus congestus	Cu con or Tcu	+	+		+	+		+	+	+
Moderate vertical	Nimbostratus	Ns	+	+					+		
Moderate vertical	Cumulus mediocris	Cu med	+	+		+				+	+
Low	Stratocumulus	Sc	+	+		+					
Low	Cumulus humilis	Cu hum		+							
Low	Stratus	St									

=== Genitus mother clouds ===
Altocumulogenitus
Formed by the partial transformation of altocumulus mother cloud.
Altostratogenitus
Formed by the partial transformation of altostratus.
Cirrogenitus
Partial transformation of cirrus.
Cirrocumulogenitus
Partial transformation of cirrocumulus.
Cirrostratogenitus
Partial transformation of cirrostratus.
Cumulogenitus
Spreading out or partial transformation of cumulus.
Cumulonimbogenitus
Spreading out or partial transformation of cumulonimbus.
Nimbostratogenitus
Partial transformation of nimbostratus.
Stratogenitus
Partial transformation of stratus.
Stratocumulogenitus
Partial transformation of stratocumulus.

=== Other genitus clouds ===
Cataractagenitus (cataracta-/pertaining to a river cataract)
Formed from the mist at a waterfall, the downdraft caused from the cloud is counteracted by the ascending air displacement from the waterfall and may go on to form other types of clouds such as cumulus cataractagenitus.
Flammagenitus (flamma-/pertaining to fire)
Formed by convection associated with large wildfires.
Homogenitus (homo-/pertaining to humans)
Formed as a result of human activities, particularly aircraft at high altitudes and heat-generating industrial activities at surface level. If a homogenitus cloud of one genus changes to another genus type, it is then termed a homomutatus cloud.
Silvagenitus (silva-/pertaining to trees or forests)
Formed by low-level condensation of water vapor released by vegetation, especially forest canopies.

=== Mutatus mother clouds ===
Nomenclature works the same way as for genitus mother clouds except for the mutatus suffix to indicate the complete rather than the partial transformation of the original cloud type. e.g. Altocumulomutatus – formed by the complete transformation of altocumulus mother cloud.

The possible combinations of genera and mother clouds can be seen in this table. The genitus and mutatus clouds are each sorted from left to right in alphabetical order. The genus types and some sub-types are arranged from top to bottom in approximate descending order of average overall altitude range. Each box is marked where a particular genus or sub-type has a particular genitus or mutatus mother cloud.

Level	Name	Class	Genitus mother										Mutatus mother									
Level	Name	Abbrev.	Ac	As	Ci	Cc	Cs	Cu	Cb	Ns	St	Sc	Ac	As	Ci	Cc	Cs	Cu	Cb	Ns	St	Sc
Level	Name	Abbrev.	altocumulo	altostrato	cirro	cirrocumulo	cirrostrato	cumulo	cumulonimbo	nimbostrato	strato	stratocumulo	altocumulo	altostrato	cirro	cirrocumulo	cirrostrato	cumulo	cumulonimbo	nimbostrato	strato	stratocumulo
High	Cirrus	Ci	+			+			+								+					
High	Cirrocumulus	Cc											+		+		+					
High	Cirrostratus	Cs				+			+				+		+	+						
Middle	Altocumulus	Ac						+	+					+		+				+	+	
Middle	Altostratus	As	+						+								+			+		
Towering vertical	Cumulonimbus	Cb	+	+				+		+		+						+				
Towering vertical	Cumulus congestus	Cu con or Tcu																				
Moderate vertical	Nimbostratus	Ns						+	+				+	+								+
Moderate vertical	Cumulus mediocris	Cu med	+									+									+	+
Low	Stratocumulus	Sc		+				+	+	+			+							+	+	
Low	Cumulus humilis	Cu hum						+	+	+												+
Low	Stratus	St	+									+									+	+

=== Informal terms recently accepted for WMO classification with Latin nomenclature ===
Aviaticus cloud
Persistent condensation trails (contrails) formed by ice crystals originating from water vapor emitted by aircraft engines. Usually resembles cirrus; recognized as a WMO genitus cloud cirrus homogenitus (man-made). Further transformation into cirrus, cirrocumulus, or cirrostratus homomutatus is possible depending on atmospheric stability and wind shear.
Fallstreak hole
Supercooled altocumulus or cirrocumulus distinguished by a hole with ragged edges and virga or wisps of cirrus. Accepted as a WMO supplementary feature to be named cavum (hole).
Kelvin–Helmholtz cloud

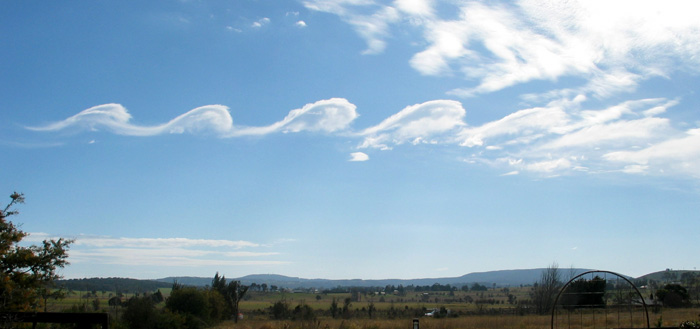
Fluctus clouds over Mount Duval in Australia

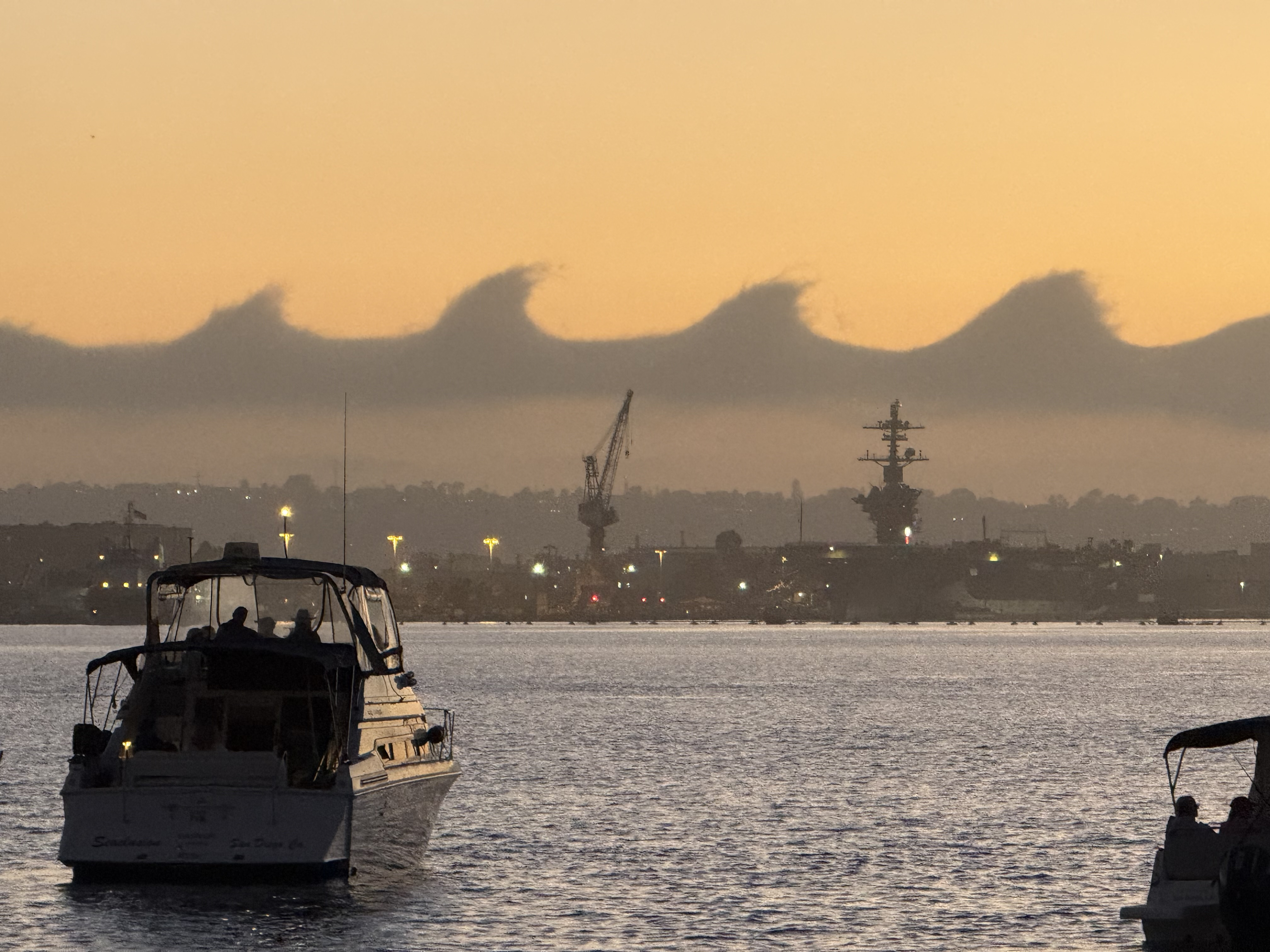
Fluctus clouds over San Diego Bay in California

Crested wave-like clouds formed by wind-shear instability that may occur at any altitude in the troposphere. Accepted as a WMO supplementary feature with the Latin name fluctus.
Pyrocumulus and Pyrocumulonimbus
Cumulus and cumulonimbus clouds formed by quickly generated ground heat; including forest fires, volcanic eruptions and low level nuclear detonation. Accepted as a WMO genitus cloud with the Latin name flammagenitus, or homogenitus in the case of small cumulus formed by contained human activity.
Roll cloud

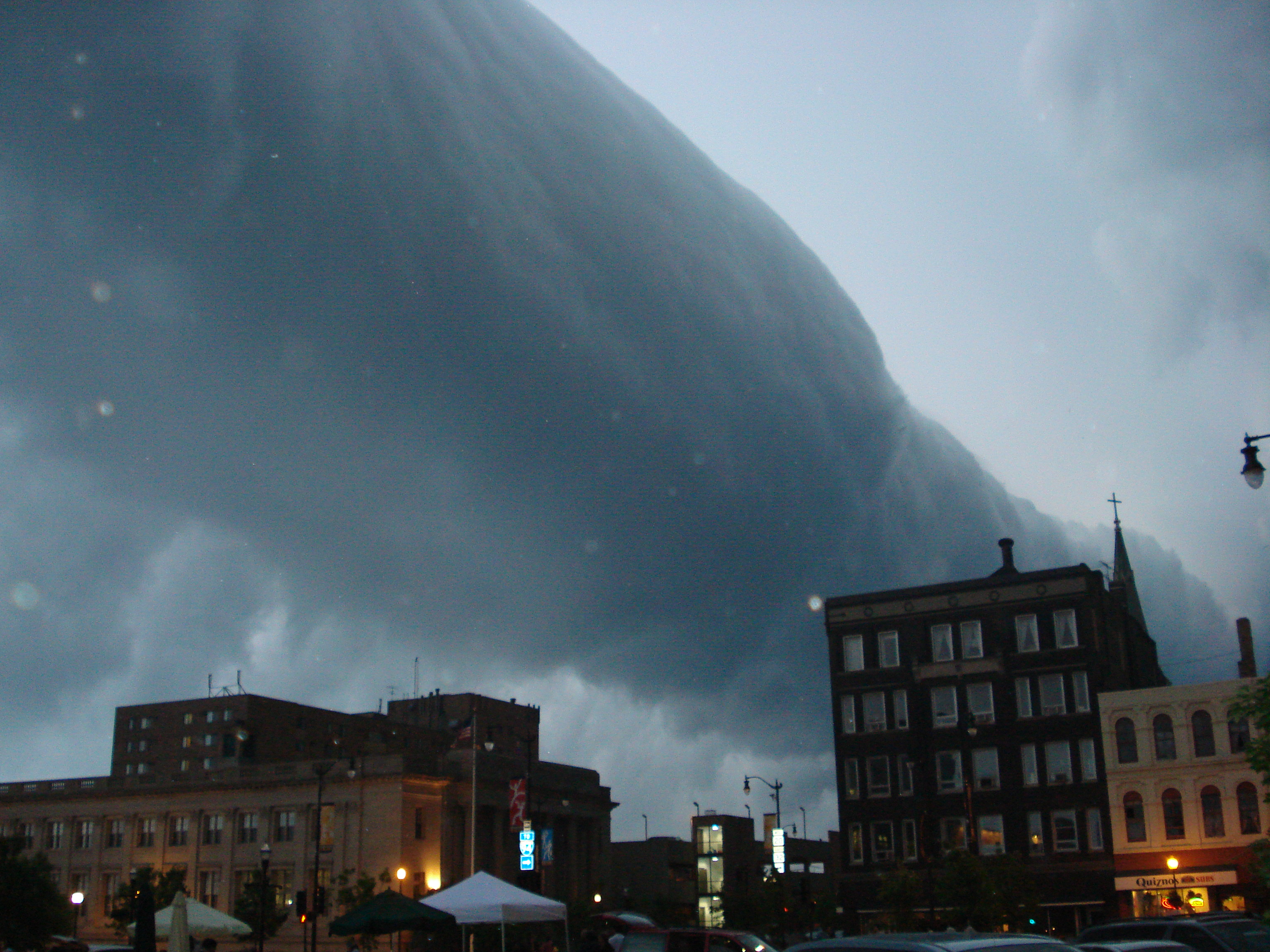
Roll cloud over Wisconsin

Elongated, low-level, tube shaped, horizontal formation not associated with a parent cloud. Accepted as a WMO stratocumulus or altocumulus species with the Latin name volutus.

=== WMO and informal terms related to free-convective cloud types and storms ===
- Accessory cloud (WMO supplementary feature) – secondary cloud that is associated with but separate from a main cloud.
- Anvil (WMO supplementary feature incus) – the anvil top of a cumulonimbus cloud.
- Anvil dome (WMO supplementary feature incus) – the overshooting top on a Cb that is often present on a supercell.
- Anvil rollover – (slang) circular protrusion attached to underside of anvil.

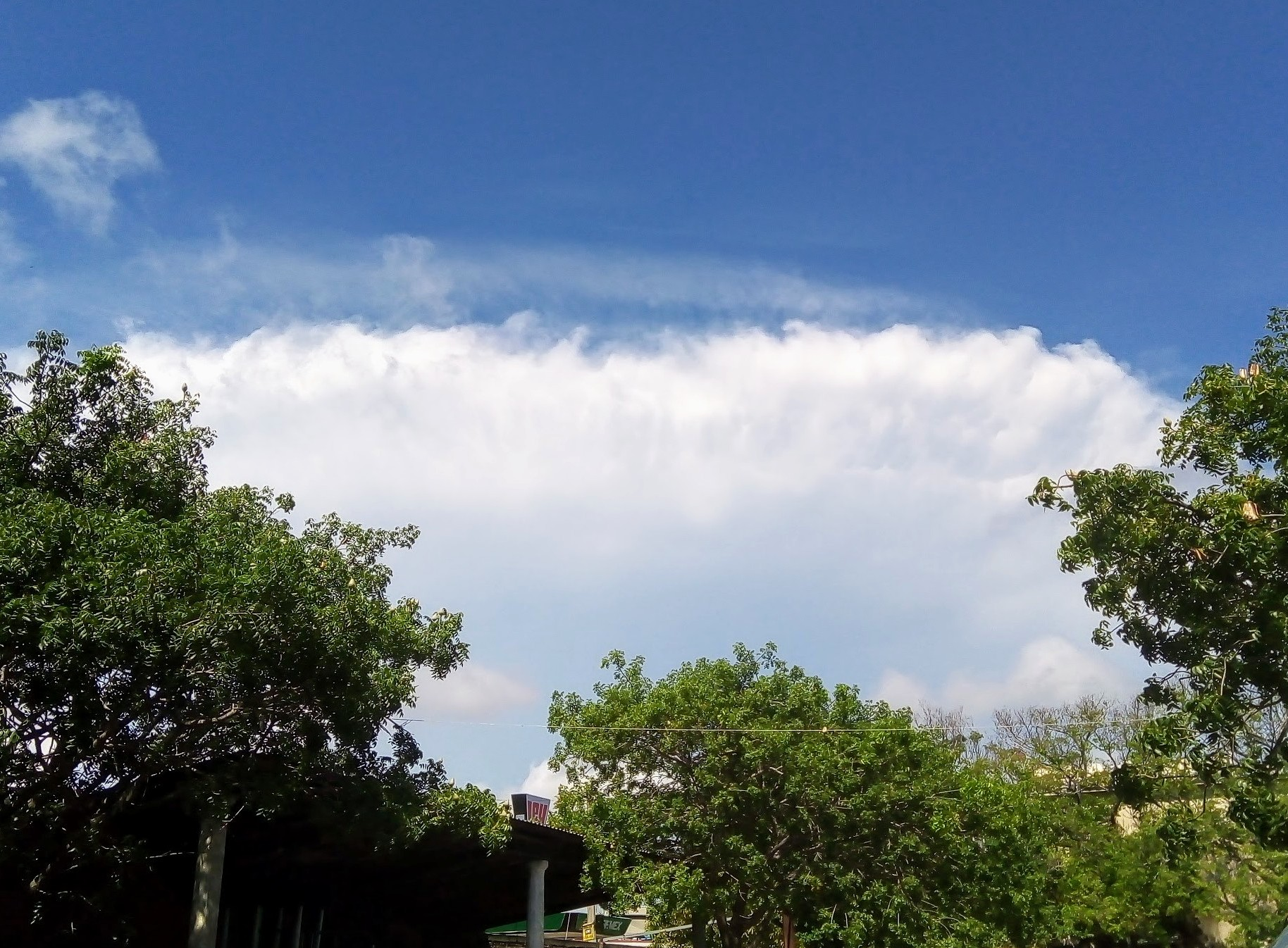
Anvil rollover

- Arcus cloud (WMO supplementary feature) – arch or a bow shape, attached to cumulus, thick with ragged edges.
- Backsheared anvil – (slang) anvil that spreads upwind, indicative of extreme weather.
- Clear slot or dry slot (informal term) – an evaporation of clouds as a rear flank downdraft descends and dries out cloud and occludes around a mesocyclone.
- Cloud tags (WMO species fractus) – ragged detached portions of cloud.
- Collar cloud (WMO velum accessory cloud) – ring shape surrounding upper part of wall cloud.
- Condensation funnel (WMO supplementary feature tuba) – the cloud of a funnel cloud aloft or a tornado.
- Altocumulus castellanus (WMO genus and species) – castle crenellation-shaped altocumulus clouds.
- Cumulus (WMO genus) – heaped clouds.
- Cumulus castellanus – (informal variation of WMO genus and species cumulus congestus) cumulus with tops shaped like castle crenellations.
- Cumulus congestus (WMO genus and species) – considerable vertical development and heaped into cauliflower shapes.
- Cumulus fractus (WMO genus and species) – ragged detached portions of cumulus cloud.
- Cumulus humilis (WMO genus and species) – small, low, flattened cumulus, early development.
- Cumulus mediocris (WMO genus and species) – medium-sized cumulus with bulges at the top.
- Cumulus pileus (WMO genus and accessory cloud) – capped, hood-shaped cumulus cloud.
- Cumulus praecipitatio (WMO genus and supplementary feature) – cumulus whose precipitation reaches the ground.
- Cumulus radiatus (WMO genus and variety) – cumulus arranged in parallel lines that appear to converge near the horizon.

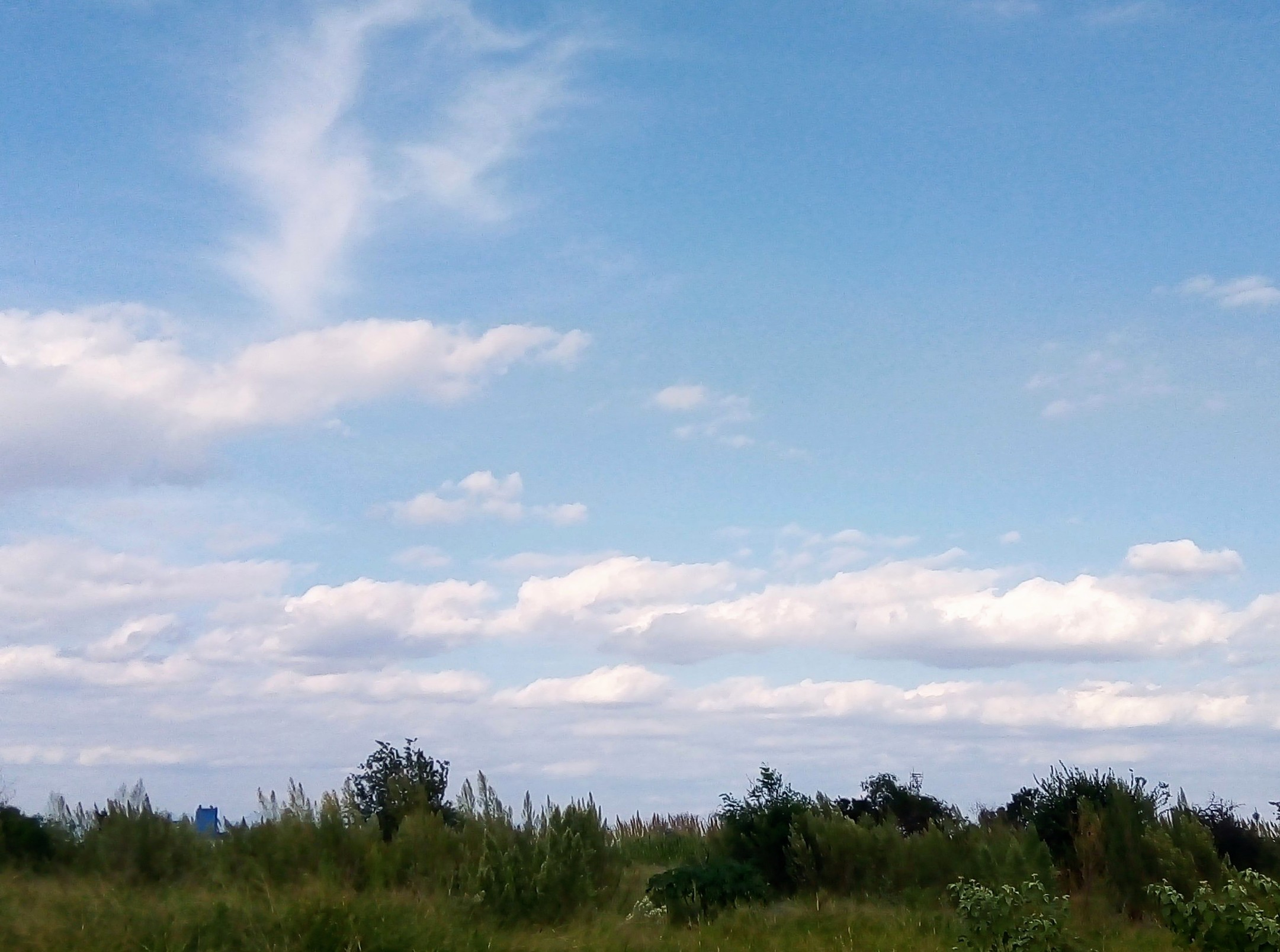
Cumulus radiatus clouds

- Cumulus tuba (WMO genus and supplementary feature) – column hanging from the bottom of cumulus.
- Cumulonimbus (WMO genus) – heaped towering rain-bearing clouds that stretch to the upper levels of the troposphere.
- Cumulonimbus calvus (WMO genus and species) – cumulonimbus with round tops like cumulus congestus.
- Cumulonimbus capillatus (WMO genus and species) – Cb with cirriform top.
- Cumulonimbus incus (WMO genus and supplementary feature) – Cb capillatus with anvil top.
- Cumulonimbus mamma (WMO genus and supplementary feature) – Cb with pouch-like protrusions that hang from under anvil or cloud base.
- Cumulonimbus pannus (WMO genus and accessory cloud) – shredded sections attached to main Cb cloud.
- Cumulonimbus pileus (WMO genus and accessory cloud) – capped, hood-shaped cloud above a cumulonimbus cloud.
- Cumulonimbus praecipitatio (WMO genus and supplementary feature) – Cb whose precipitation reaches the ground.
- Cumulonimbus tuba (WMO genus and supplementary feature) – column hanging from the bottom of cumulonimbus.
- Debris cloud (informal term) – rotating "cloud" of debris or dust, often surrounding the base of a tornado, beneath a condensation funnel.
- Funnel cloud (WMO supplementary feature tuba) – rotating funnel of cloud hanging from under Cb, not making contact with ground.
- Hail fog (informal term) – a shallow surface layer of fog that sometimes forms in vicinity of deep hail accumulation, can be very dense.
- Hot tower (informal term) – a tropical cumulonimbus cloud that penetrates the tropopause.
- Inflow band (informal term) – a laminar band marking inflow to a Cb, can occur at lower or mid levels of the cloud.
- Inverted cumulus (informal variation of WMO supplementary feature mamma) – cumulus which has transferred momentum from an exceptionally intense Cb tower and is convectively growing on the underside of an anvil.
- Knuckles (informal variation of WMO supplementary feature mamma) – lumpy protrusion that hangs from edge or underside of anvil.
- Marine layer
- Overcast
- Pyrocumulus and Pyrocumulonimbus– intense ground-heat cloud proposed for WMO classification (see above).
- Rope – (slang) narrow, sometimes twisted funnel type cloud seen after a tornado dissipates.
- Rope cloud (informal term) – A narrow, long, elongated line of cumulus clouds that sometimes develop at the leading edge of an advancing cold front that is often visible in satellite imagery.
- Scud cloud (informal term for WMO species fractus) – ragged detached portions of cloud that usually form in precipitation.
- Sea of clouds
- Shelf cloud (informal term for WMO supplementary feature arcus) – wedge-shaped cloud often attached to the underside of Cb.
- Stratus fractus (WMO genus and species) – ragged detached portions of stratus cloud that usually form in precipitation (see also scud cloud).
- Striations (informal term for WMO accessory cloud velum) – a groove or band of clouds encircling an updraft tower, indicative of rotation.
- Tail cloud (informal term) – an area of condensation consisting of laminar band and cloud tags extending from a wall cloud towards a precipitation core.
- Towering cumulus (TCu) -aviation term for WMO genus and species cumulus congestus, a large cumulus cloud with great vertical development, usually with a cauliflower-like appearance, but lacking the characteristic anvil of a Cb.
- Wall cloud (informal term) – distinctive fairly large lowering of the rain-free base of a Cb, often rotating.

== Other planets ==
=== Venus ===
Thick overcast clouds of sulfur dioxide and carbon dioxide in three main layers at altitudes of 45 to 65 km that obscure the planet's surface and can produce virga.

Stratiform
Overcast opaque clouds sheets.
Stratocumuliform
Wave clouds with clear gaps through which lower stratiform layers may be seen.
Cumuliform and cumulonimbiform
Embedded convective cells that can produce lightning.

=== Mars ===
Clouds resembling several terrestrial types can be seen over Mars and are believed to be composed of water-ice.

Extremely high cirriform
Noctilucent clouds are known to form near the poles at altitudes similar to or higher than the same type of clouds over Earth.
High cirriform
Thin scattered wispy cloud resembling cirrus through which the planet's surface can be seen.
High stratocumuliform
Thin scattered wave-cloud resembling cirrocumulus.
Low stratocumuliform
Wave-cloud resembling stratocumulus, especially as a polar cap cloud over the winter pole which is mostly composed of suspended frozen carbon dioxide.
Surface-based
Morning fog of water and/or carbon dioxide commonly forms in low areas of the planet.

=== Jupiter and Saturn ===
Cloud decks in parallel bands of latitude at and below the tropopause alternately composed of ammonia crystals and ammonium hydrosulfate.

Cirriform
Bands of cloud resembling cirrus located mainly in the highest of three main layers that cover Jupiter.
Stratiform and stratocumuliform
Wave and haze clouds that are seen mostly in the middle layer.
Cumuliform and cumulonimbiform
Convective clouds in the lowest layer that are capable of producing thunderstorms and may be composed at least partly of water droplets. an intermediate deck of ammonium hydrosulfide, and an inner deck of cumulus water clouds.

=== Uranus and Neptune ===
Cloud layers composed mainly of methane gas.

Cirriform
High wispy formations resembling cirrus.
Stratiform
Layers of haze-cloud that lack any distinct features.
Cumuliform and cumulonimbiform
Lower-based convective clouds that can produce thunderstorms.

== See also ==
- Cloud species
