= Castellanus =

Type of cumulus cloud

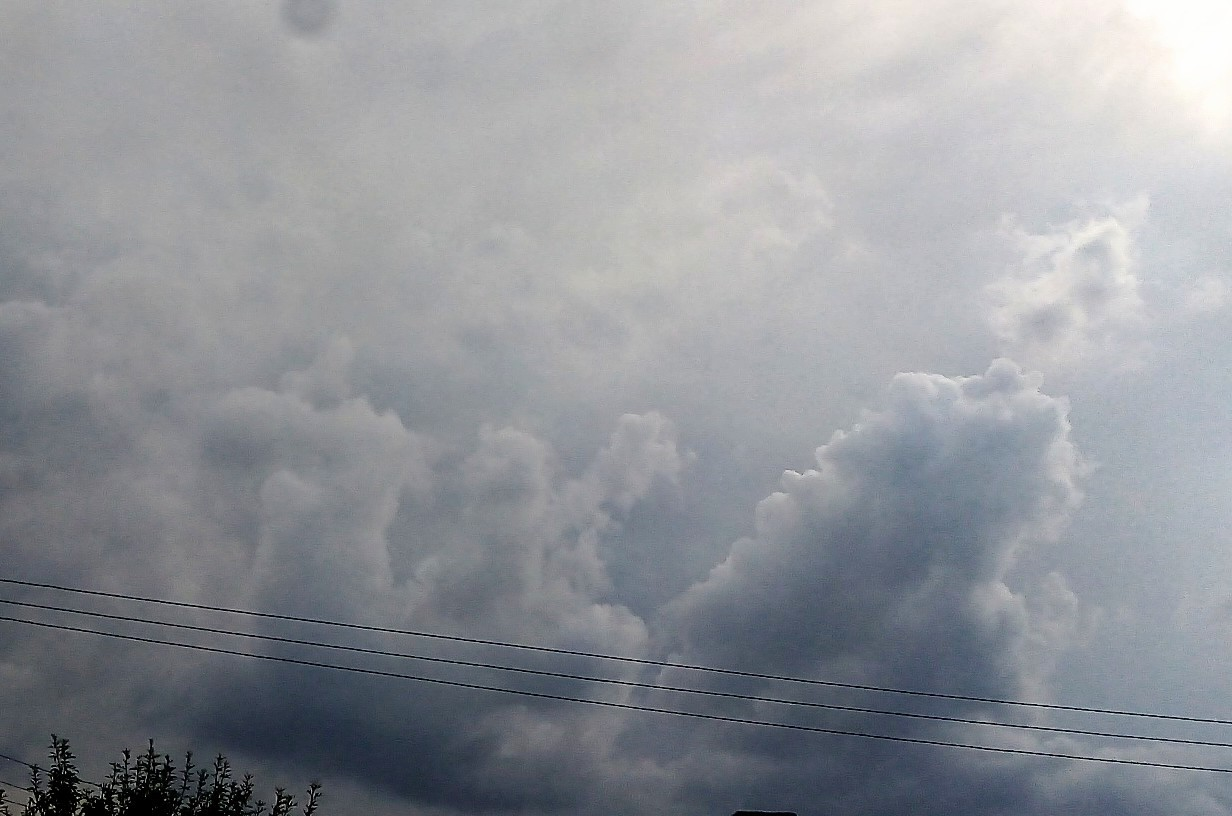
Stratocumulus castellanus

A castellanus (from Latin castellanus 'castle'), or castellatus, is a cloud that displays at least in its upper part cumuliform protuberances having the shape of turrets that give a crenellated aspect. Some of these turrets are higher than they are wide; they have a common base and seem to be arranged in a line. The castellanus characteristic is particularly obvious when the clouds are observed from the side (i.e., from a vantage point on a line perpendicular to the line of orientation).

It is a cloud species attached to the cloud genera cirrus, cirrocumulus, altocumulus and stratocumulus. Species of the clouds include cirrus castellanus, cirrocumulus castellanus, altocumulus castellanus and stratocumulus castellanus. Sometimes cumulus castellanus are referred to, but the type is not recognised by France's national meteorological service Météo-France, or by the American Meteorological Society and World Meteorological Organisation. Those clouds some would classify as cumulus castellanus typically do not have a common base and are not arranged in a line, thus differing to some extent from the more universally-recognised castellanus types. Some scientists also think that the castellanus should be a full cloud genus, and not just a cloud species. The Federal Aviation Administration implicitly considers a castellanus as a full cloud genus.

== Physics ==
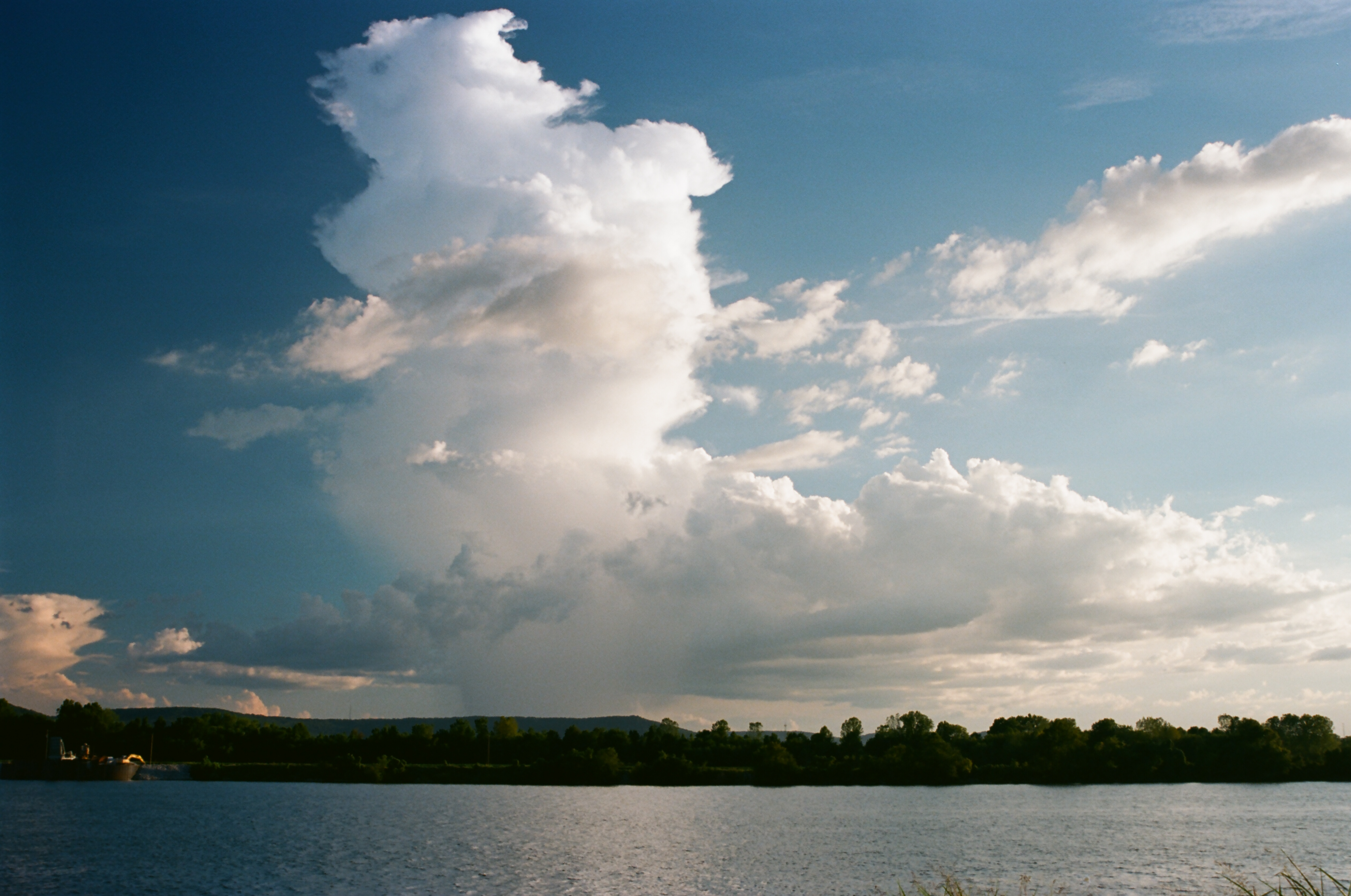
Figure 1: Single cell cumulonimbus originating from a castellanus

All castellanus clouds show that there exists an unstable (or conditionally unstable) layer at their altitude but not necessarily under the cloud. Some scientists (Scorer, Corfidi) define a castellanus as a cloud generated by the release of latent heat during the ascension of a saturated thermal column in an unstable (or conditionally unstable) layer at altitude. The cloud will have the appearance of a ''turkey tower''. This unstable (or conditionally unstable) layer can be generated in different ways: (1) a large scale lifting (synoptic scale) that under some circumstances makes the air unstable since the temperature at the base of the layer decreases more slowly than the temperature at the top of cloud due to adiabatic decompression, (2) a cooling of the cloud top that generates the same differential, and (3) an unstable (or conditionally unstable) air mass advection over a stable air mass, etc.

Castellanus can arise from clouds formed by either surface-based convection (e.g., cumulus) or elevated convection (e.g., altocumulus). Most of the convection in the towers, however, is due to instability (or conditional instability) at cloud height – not to convection below the cloud. The air surrounding the cloud is rapidly entrained into the towers. Cloud physics show that if a cloud does not contain enough humidity, (Note: The relative humidity inside a cloud is not strictly equal to 100%. It can in fact vary between 70% (on the side) and 107% (at the centre) inside convective clouds.) the water vapour contained inside the cloud will only condense at a higher level, where the temperature of the ascending parcel reaches its saturation point. This will consequently dry out the cloud from the base and eventually result in its disappearance if this dry air does not condense below the cloud top. Conversely, if the air surrounding the cloud is nearly saturated and a thick, unstable (or conditionally unstable) layer exists above the initial cloud, convection will be able to continue. Then a tower, that will become wider and wider, will build up that will in some cases become a cumulonimbus.

The evolution of a castellanus thus depends on the amount of humidity and the characteristics of the unstable (or conditionally unstable) layer. Scattered clouds in the sky are generally found in relatively dry air with a more humid ''pocket''. If they show such a tall and narrow growth, the dry air surrounding them will not perpetuate the convection which will result in the cloud dissipation. However, a more extended cloud layer shows a higher relative humidity in the layer; a scenario more likely to be associated with over-development of the towers.

== Nomenclature ==
The species castellanus is defined in the International Cloud Atlas, which had its last official release in 1975. It is based on ground visual observation of cloud shape. In practice, the shape of a castellanus is related to the physical process producing it: local instability (or conditional instability) at the top of the cloud that breaks the temperature inversion and is the cause of the formation of towers, this being confirmed by vertical soundings.

However, although the species castellanus applies to different genera of convective clouds at different levels, the most current cloud type is the altocumulus castellanus, the base of which is in the medium level. This is reinforced by the fact that pilot's manuals interchangeably talk about either castellanus or altocumulus castellanus, restricting the meaning of the word catellanus.

To alleviate this confusion, scientists Richard S. Scorer and Corfidi propose a cloud classification based only on physical criteria obtained from vertical soundings and observations from meteorological satellites to reclassify the castellanus as a cloud genus at the same level as a cumulus or a cirrus. Corfidi has long criticized the resistance from official bodies to this change. However, the 2016 version of the International Cloud Atlas will not change the status of the castellanus. The same scientists have a similar opinion about lenticular clouds that can exist at different levels that are not recognized as a full cloud genus but only as a species.

=== Criticism specifics ===
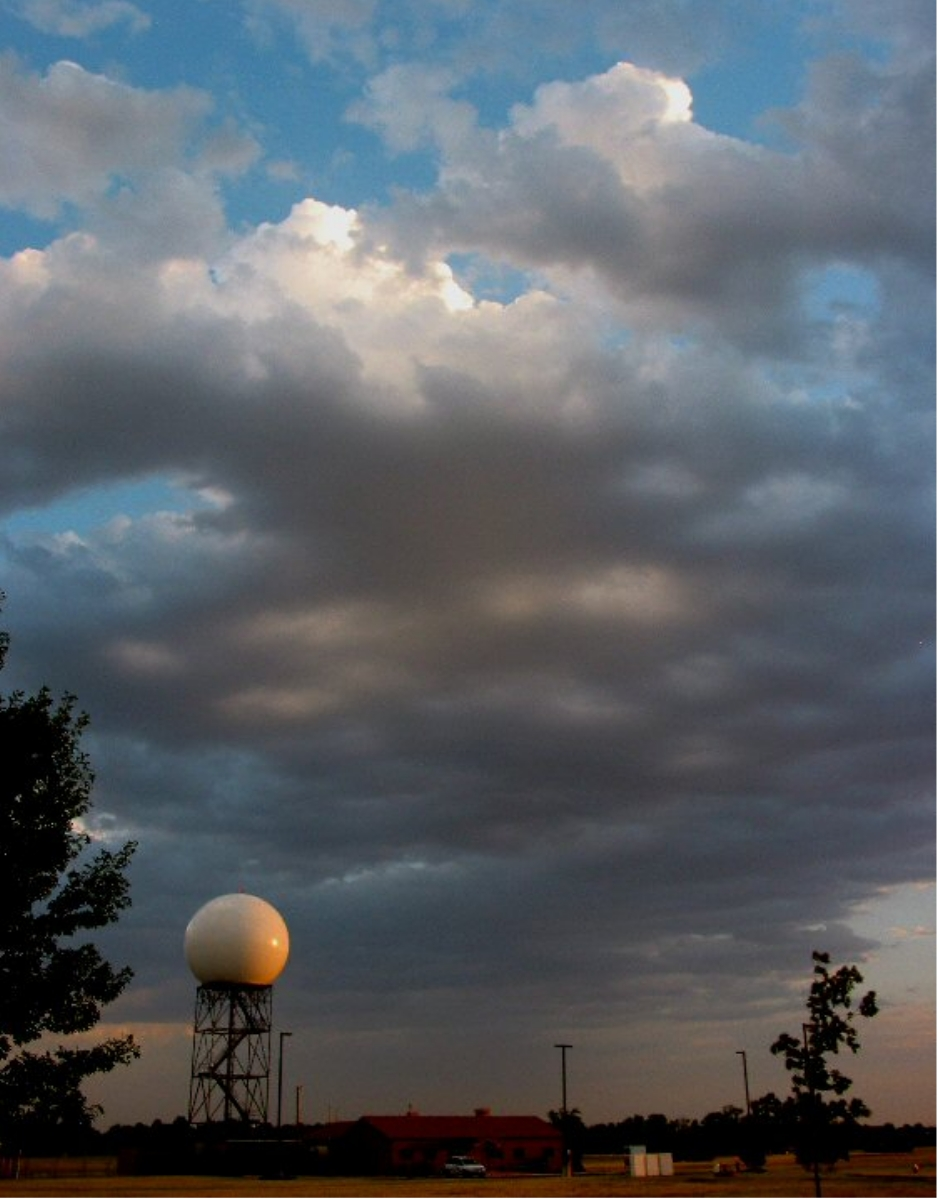
Figure 2: Convective clouds above a cloud layer generated by an expanding outflow of a downburst. View to the south.

Scientists note a common confusion between convective clouds generated solely (or at least primarily) by diurnal heating of the ground and the castellanus, which is primarily a product of instability (or conditional instability) at the top of a cloud such as a cumulus, stratocumulus, or an altocumulus, the latter two genera being easily confused.

Moreover, the International Cloud Atlas (ICA) is not entirely precise regarding how to determine the genus of a convective cloud. Per the ICA (1975, p. 15–16), the base of a cumulus cloud is usually between the surface and 2 kilometres (6,600 ft). This height limit originates from observations in temperate climates where the surface temperature and humidity are about average. It does not take into account how the cloud is formed. In the American West, the base of cumulus clouds can reach 4,000 metres (13,000 ft), since the combination of a low dew point (10 °C (50 °F)) and high temperature (up to 45 °C (113 °F)) will yield a very high convective condensation level. While the ICA allows that a cumulus cloud can have a base higher than 2 kilometres (6,600 ft) (by saying that cumulus clouds usually have their bases at or below this height), guidance given on page 16 of the ICA could lead to misclassification of a high cumulus cloud. This guidance says that a cloud's genus can be determined "by making a choice from among the genera normally encountered in the etage (height range) corresponding to its height." This could lead the observer to rule out cumulus as a possible genus for a cloud that has all the ICA-described characteristics of a cumulus except that its base is above the "Low" etage (surface to 2 kilometres (6,600 ft)). The observer, conscientiously trying to comply with ICA classification guidance, might then misidentify this cloud as an altocumulus (perhaps altocumulus floccus), although the instability creating it is at a different level compared to an altocumulus.

To complicate matters even further, convective clouds of type castellanus can be generated by updrafts originating at intermediate altitudes with respect to the levels defined in the Atlas; it makes a continuum of possible altitudes. These intermediate-altitude convective clouds will have flat bases except when generating precipitation. Moreover, the altitude of their bases can be higher than the level of condensation by convection or even higher than the level of free convection; it depends on the altitude where the forcing occurs. This phenomenon may occur when a cumulonimbus is in the vicinity. The latter will produce an outflow downstream of the cumulonimbus. The outflow boundary behaves like a pseudo cold front that generates a mechanical forcing where the outflow meets the surrounding air. The lifting enables the formation of convective towers at the level of the top of the outflow in preexisting clouds if the air is conditionally unstable.

An example of this phenomenon is shown in the adjacent figure and corresponds to Figure 2 of a paper written by Corfidi; the thunderstorm is located to the east of the picture. The picture's caption in Corfidi's paper refers to the cloud as a castellanus and not as a cumulus mediocris altocumulogenitus as the draft International Cloud Atlas would suggest.

== Soaring ==
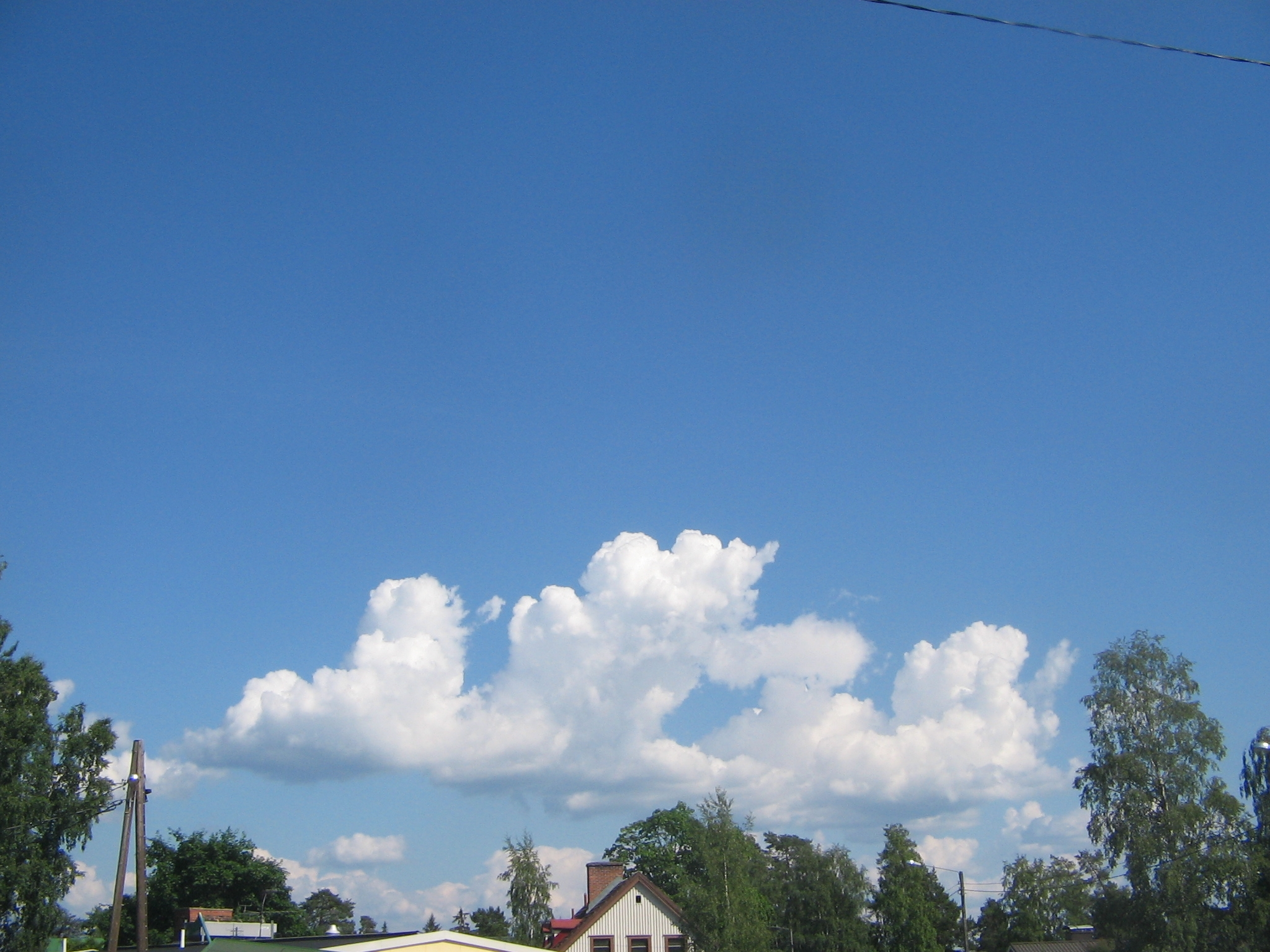
Figure 3: Cumulus castellanus.Thes clouds can sometimes be used by glider pilots

Castellanus (clouds made of very narrow columns) are notorious as being unusable by glider pilots. In order for a cloud to have a usable thermal, the updraft column needs to exist under the cloud, in which case the cloud will have a flat base. An altocumulus castellanus, however, can be identified by the lack of a well-defined base. As said above, a hybrid cloud between cumulus and castellanus can be used by a glider pilot.

Castellanus that are unfavorable to soaring can be easily identified and are nicknamed ''rocket clouds.'' The visual difference between a cumulus and a castellanus is that the former has a flat base while the latter generally has no clearly defined base. However, a visual observation of the cloud may not be sufficient, since in some cases the hybrid castellanus (pseudo cumulus) may have a flat base. The only sure way to distinguish between these two types of clouds is through an atmospheric sounding preceding the flight. If the base of these false cumulus is higher than the convective condensation level, the pilot is probably close to unwanted cumulonimbus. Moreover, when a cumulus breaks down, there may still exist an updraft column under the cloud base that did not originate from the ground. In particular, at the end of the day, the air-mass can be stable up to 2000 feet and unstable above this stable layer. The cumulus turn into stratocumulus or altocumulus depending on their height. Before the 1956 version of the International Cloud Atlas, these clouds were called stratocumulus or altocumulus "vesperalis". Directly under these clouds, updrafts are still present. The meteorologist Corfidi explains that these seemingly innocuous clouds that break down rapidly can be a harbinger of nocturnal thunderstorms.

To identify non-ground-based convection, it is possible to compare the height of the base of the "cumulus" c with the convective condensation level h. This height h is given by the following formula:

$h = a \times (T - D)$ where a = 0.125 km / °C;

T is the surface temperature and D is the dew point. The variables c, T and D can be easily accessed from a neighbouring METAR.

The computation of this height h is based on first principles and therefore is rather accurate. Consequently, if $c \gg h$, the observed cumulus are almost certainly castellanus under Corfidi's meaning. Then, it will be wise to be wary of the presence of a flanking line or of downbursts in the vicinity. Figure 2 shows such a pattern.

== See also ==
- Altocumulus castellanus

== Bibliography ==
- Cotton, William; Bryan, George; van den Heever, Susan (2011). Storm and Cloud Dynamics Second Edition. International geophysics series. Vol. 99. Academic Press. ISBN 978-0-12-088542-8.
- International cloud atlas, volume I (PDF). Vol. 1. World Meteorological Organisation. 1975. Archived from the original (PDF) on 2016-07-25.
- International cloud atlas, volume II (PDF). Vol. 2. World Meteorological Organisation. 1975. Archived from the original (PDF) on 2017-06-16.
- Corfidi, Stephen F. (2008). "Elevated Convection and Castellanus: Ambiguities, Significance, and Questions" (PDF). Weather and Forecasting. 23 (6): 1280–1303. Bibcode:2008WtFor..23.1280C. doi:10.1175/2008WAF2222118.1.
