= Altocumulus lacunosus cloud =

Type of altocumulus cloud

Altocumulus lacunosus
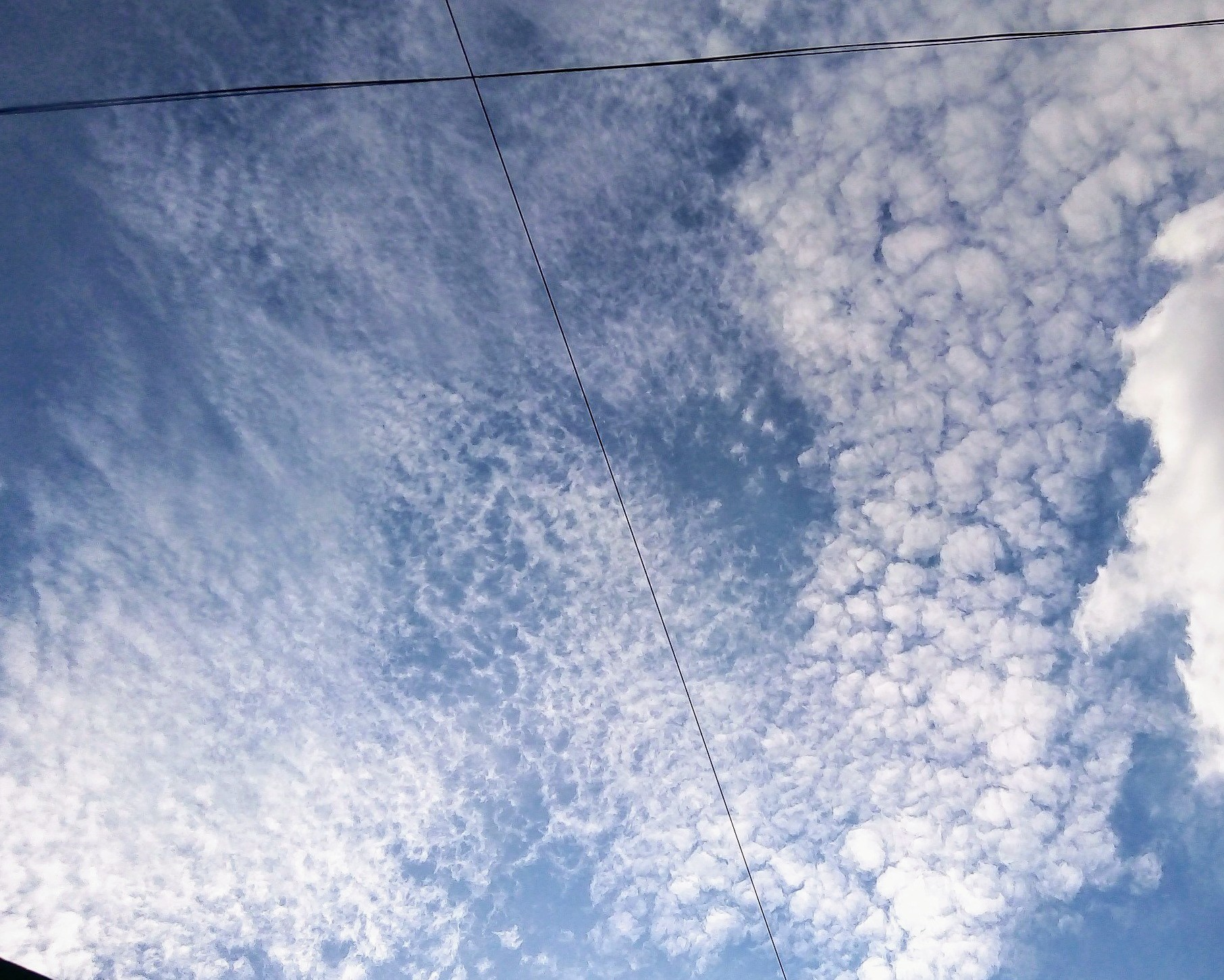
- Altocumulus stratiformis lacunosus cloud, next to altocumulus floccus
- Abbreviation: Ac la
- Genus: alto-, meaning high, cumulo-, meaning heap, and lacunosus, meaning full of gaps
- Variety: lacunosus (full of gaps)
- Altitude: Above m (Above ft)
- Appearance: Perforated with round, frayed holes
- Precipitation: uncommon rain, snow, or snow pellets

Altocumulus lacunosus is a type of altocumulus cloud. The term lacunosus is from Latin, meaning "full of gaps". This type of cloud appears as holes present in an altocumulus cloud cover resembling a honeycomb. It is considered to be rare, since it is typically short-lived. Lacunosus cloud types (including this one) forms when a layer of cold air and a layer of warmer air come in contact with each other. This then causes the cold air to sink in the form of localized downdrafts. These downdrafts then strike through the cloud and create the holes.
