= Cumulus congestus cloud =

Form of cumulus clouds

Cumulus congestus
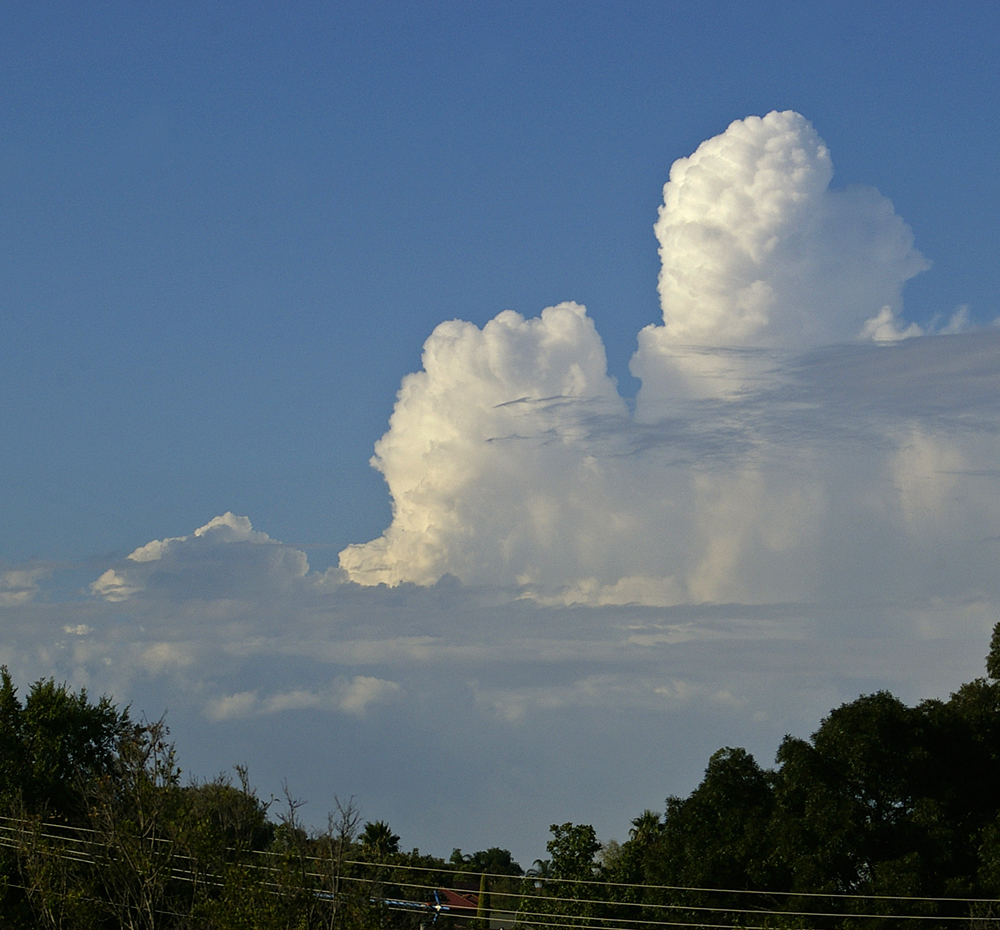
- Cumulus congestus clouds looming over the horizon, as seen from Wagga Wagga, NSW, Australia
- Abbreviation: Cu con
- Genus: Cumulus ("heaped")
- Species: Congestus ("piled up")
- Variety: Radiatuse
- Altitude: Up to 6,000 m (Up to 20,000 ft)
- Classification: Family D (Vertically developed)
- Appearance: Low-altitude, vertical, taller than it is wide, fluffy heaps of clouds with cotton-like appearance.
- Precipitation: Rain, snow, or snow pellets.

Cumulus congestus or towering cumulus clouds are a species of cumulus that can be based in the low- to middle-height ranges. They achieve considerable vertical development in areas of deep, moist convection. They are an intermediate stage between cumulus mediocris and cumulonimbus, sometimes producing rainshowers, snow, or ice pellets. Precipitation that evaporates before reaching the surface is virga.

== Description ==
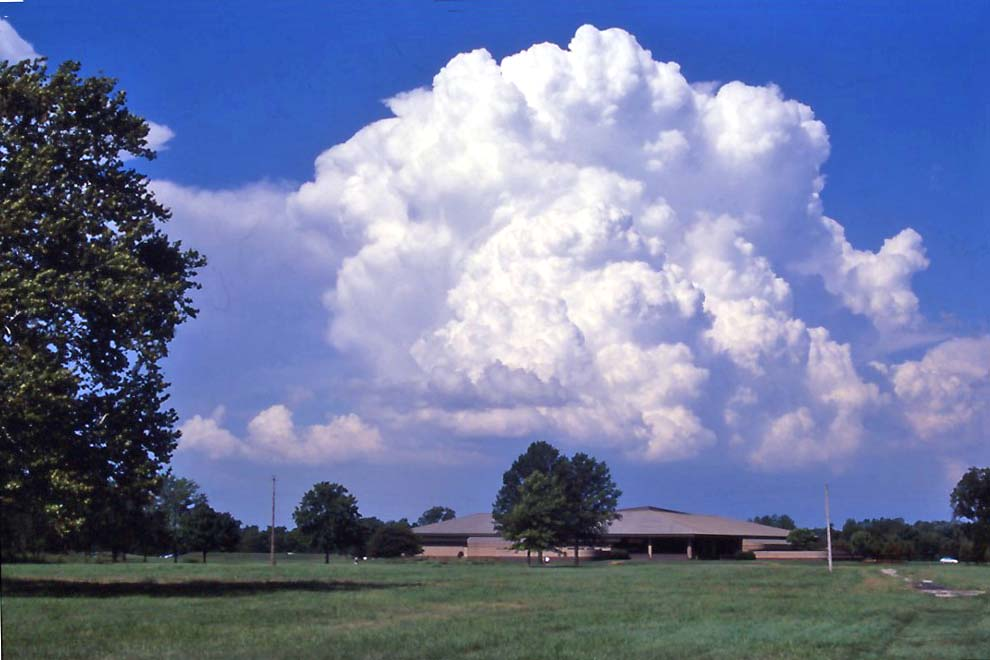
Cumulus congestus over Cahokia Mounds Museum, in Collinsville, Illinois

Cumulus congestus clouds are characteristic of unstable regions of atmosphere that are undergoing convection. They are often characterized by sharp outlines and great vertical development. Since strong updrafts produce (and primarily compose) them, the clouds are typically taller than they are wide; cloud tops can reach 6 km (3.7 mi; 20,000 ft), or higher in the tropics.

Cumulus congestus clouds are formed by the development of cumulus mediocris generally, though they can also be formed from altocumulus castellanus or stratocumulus castellanus, which are forms of cumulus castellanus. The congestus species of cloud can only be found in the genus cumulus and is designated as towering cumulus (TCu) by the International Civil Aviation Organization (ICAO).

Congestus clouds are capable of producing severe turbulence and showers of moderate to heavy intensity. This species is classified as vertical or multi-étage and is coded C_{L}2 in the synop report. These clouds are usually too large and opaque to have any opacity or pattern-based varieties. Congestus and especially cumulonimbus are hazardous to aviation.

An approaching weather front often brings mid-level clouds (e.g. altostratus or altocumulus), which when expansive and dense, reduces insolation and infringes cumulus from reaching the congestus stage. Occasionally however, particularly if the air below the mid-level cloud is very warm or unstable, some of the cumuli may become congestus and the tops of them may rise above the mid level cloud layer, sometimes resulting in showers ahead of the main rainband. This is often a sign the approaching front contains at least a few cumulonimbi amongst the nimbostratus rain clouds, and therefore any rain may be accompanied by thunderstorms.

Cumulus congestus will develop into cumulonimbus calvus under conditions of sufficient instability. This transformation can be seen by the presence of smooth, fibrous, or striated aspects assumed by the cloud's upper part. While all congestus produce showers, this development could produce heavy precipitation.

A flammagenitus cloud, or pyrocumulus, (FgCu or FgCu con) is a rapidly growing convective cloud associated with volcanic eruptions and large-scale fires (typically wildfires). Pyrocumulus congestus may thus form under those special circumstances that can also cause severe turbulence.

Cumulus congestus can also be associated with fair weather waterspouts forming from rotation at the open water surface being stretched and tightened under their updraft. Landspouts most often form under congestus, as well. Both of these non-mesocyclone associated tornadoes typically dissipate when a more pronounced precipitation shaft forms and the downdraft cuts off this process. In highly sheared environments or within the flanking line of a supercell, congestus can rotate and, on rare occasions, produce mesocyclonic-type tornadoes, with waterspouts and landspouts emanating from misocyclones (a related but distinct process).

== Turkey tower ==
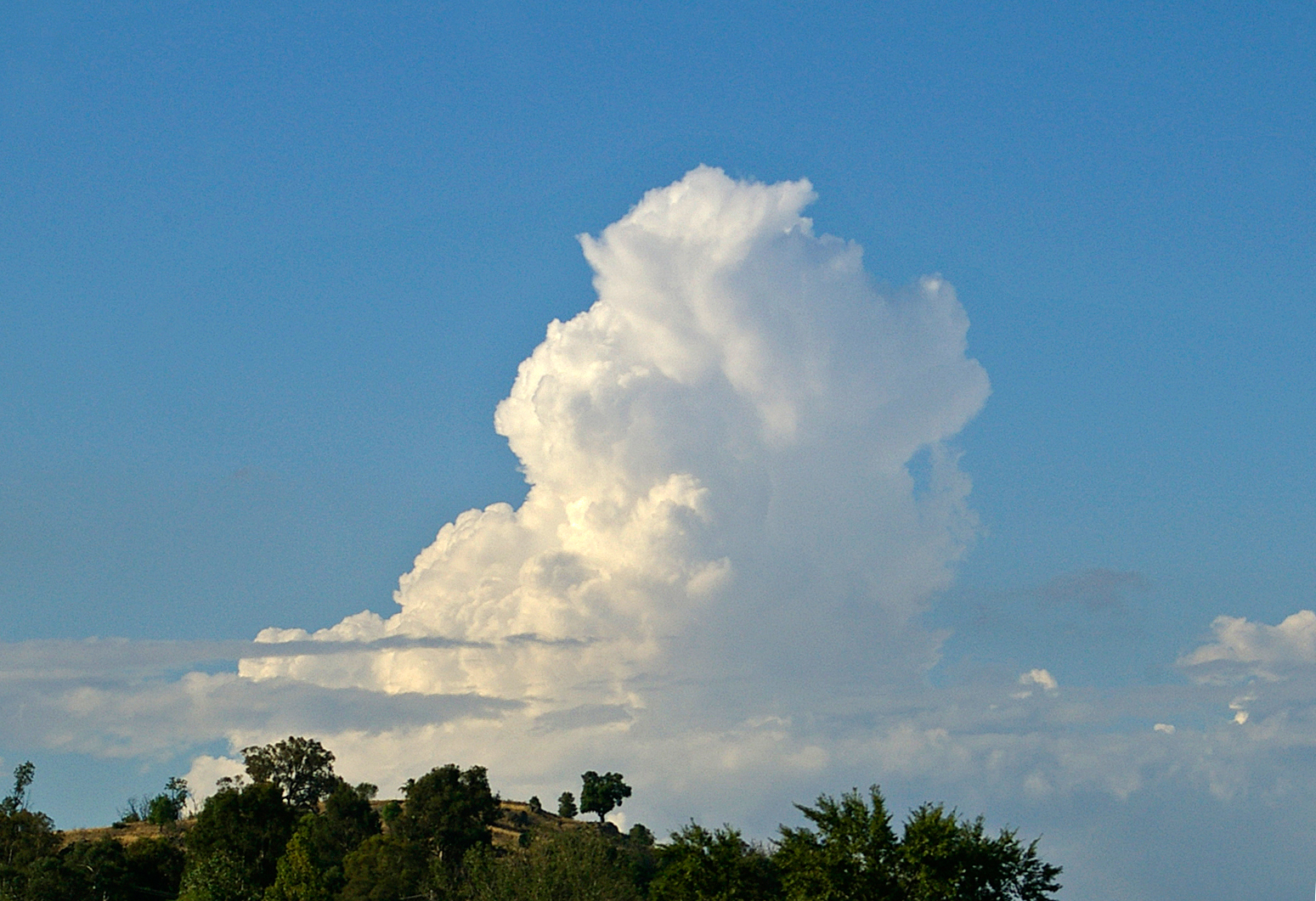
An example of a Turkey tower in the distance

Turkey tower is a slang term for a narrow, tall, individual towering cloud from a small cumulus cloud which develops and suddenly falls apart. Sudden development of turkey towers could signify the breaking or weakening of a capping inversion, and an area where these consistently form is an "agitated area", a term that applies to congestus generally.

== See also ==
- Atmospheric thermodynamics
- Convective instability
- Cumulus castellanus cloud
- Pileus

== Bibliography ==
- American Meteorological Society - Glossary of Meteorology
