= Stratocumulus floccus cloud =

Species of low-level cloud

Stratocumulus floccus
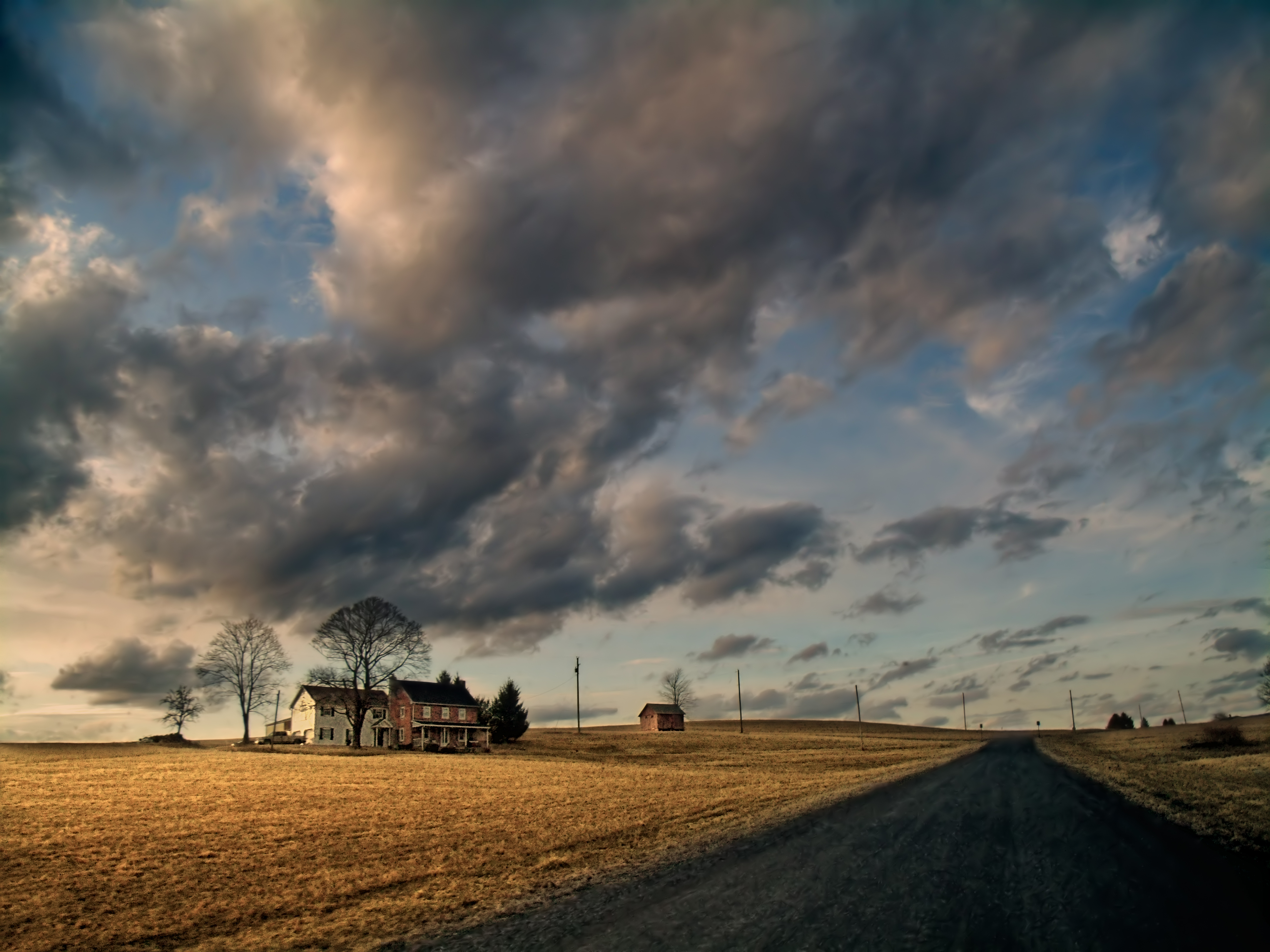
- Stratocumulus floccus
- Abbreviation: Sc flo
- Genus: Stratocumulus
- Species: Floccus
- Altitude: 500-2,000 m (2,000-6,500 ft)
- Classification: Family C (Low-level)
- Appearance: Tufted, somewhat ragged low-level cloud
- Precipitation: Uncommon, usually Virga

Stratocumulus floccus is a species of cloud belonging to Stratocumulus cloud genus. Stratocumulus floccus is usually a sign of instability at that altitude. This cloud is usually formed due to the remaining dissipation of a stratocumulus castellanus cloud base.
