= Cirrocumulus lacunosus =

Cloud type

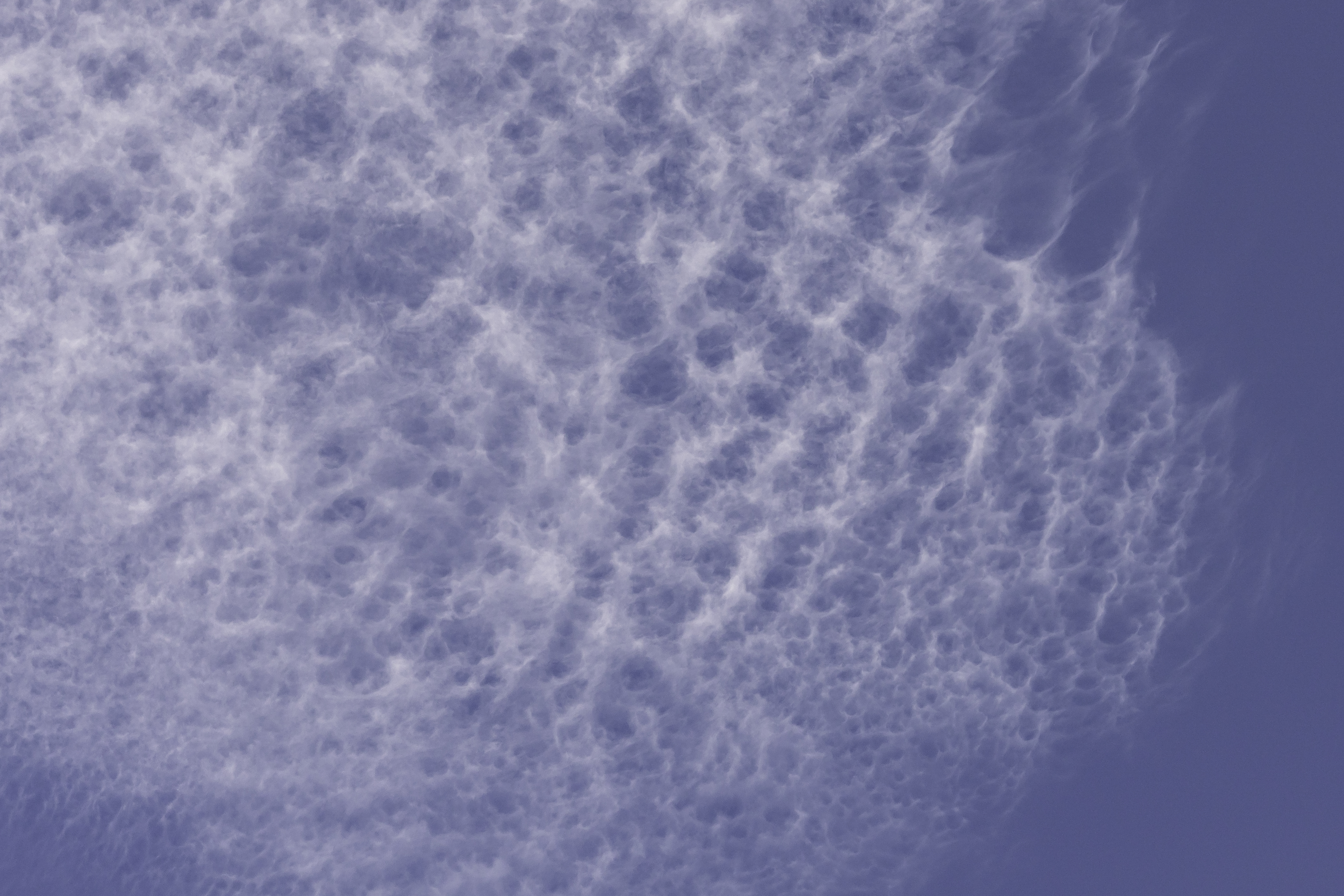
- Cirrocumulus lacunosus cloud 07/2023 (crop of full image)
- Abbreviation: Cc la
- Genus: Cirro- (curl) -cumulus (heaped)
- Variety: lacunosus (full of gaps)
- Altitude: Above 6,000 m (Above 20,000 ft)
- Appearance: Perforated with round, frayed holes
- Precipitation: Virga only

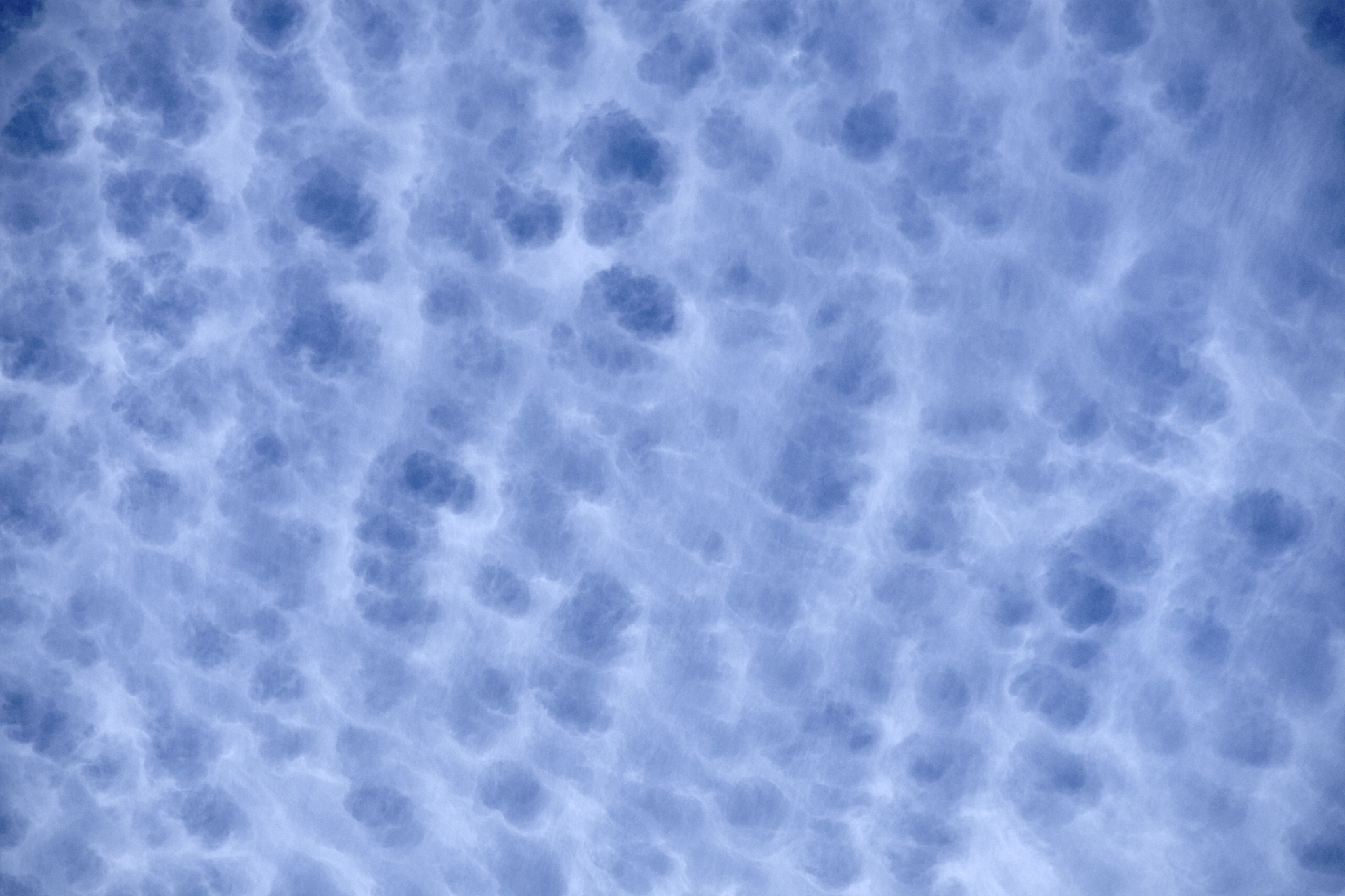
Cirrocumulus lacunosus

Cirrocumulus lacunosus, also known as cirrocumulus lacunar or cirrocumulus lacunaris, is a variety of cirrocumulus cloud. The term lacunosus is from Latin, meaning "full of hollows".

Cirrocumulus lacunosus is a relatively rare, fleeting cloud form that occurs as a cloud layer with circular gaps or holes in it. These gaps normally have frayed edges, and are often arranged in a manner that resembles a net or a honeycomb.

Formation of this short-lived phenomenon is commonly attributed to an overlying, cool layer of air mixing with an warmer atmospheric layer beneath. Each downflow of cool air creates an individual hole, and, as the warmer air rises, replacing the cooler air, water vapour condenses and forms ruffles around the gaps.

The term lacunosus is usually used to further define the species stratiformis, castellanus, or floccus.
This results in the following combinations of species and variety denominations for Cirrocumulus lacunosus:

- Cirrocumulus stratiformis lacunosus
- Cirrocumulus castellanus lacunosus
- Cirrocumulus floccus lacunosus

== Similar cloud forms ==
Lacunosus must not be confused with the superficially similar cloud form cavum, a supplementary cloud feature also known as a fallstreak hole or as a hole punch. A fallstreak hole usually consists of one very large hole in a cloud layer combined with visible downdraft filaments in the centre, as opposed to 'lacunosus', which consists of a compact lattice or honeycomb of small to tiny holes.

== See also ==
- Altocumulus lacunosus
- Stratocumulus lacunosus
- Cirrocumulus
- Fallstreak hole, cavum
- List of cloud types -> chapter "Genus cirrocumulus" -> section "Pattern-based varieties" -> scroll to list header "Lacunosus"
