= Etage =

Meteorological term

A cloud étage is a meteorological term used to delimit any one of three main altitude levels in the troposphere where certain cloud types usually form. The term is derived from the French word which means floor or storey, as in the floor of a multi-storey building. With the exception of the low étage, the altitude range of each level varies according to latitude from Earth's equator to the arctic and antarctic regions at the poles.

== Correspondences for étages and cloud genus types ==
Cloud types and étages

The high étage ranges from altitudes of 3,000 to 7,600 m (10,000 to 25,000 ft) in the polar regions, 5,000 to 12,200 m (16,500 to 40,000 ft) in the temperate regions and 6,100 to 18,300 m (20,000 to 60,000 ft) in the tropical region. The major high-level cloud types comprise cirrus, cirrocumulus, and cirrostratus.

The middle étage extends from 2,000 m (6,500 ft) above surface at any latitude as high as 4,000 m (13,000 ft) near the poles, 7,000 m (23,000 ft) at mid latitudes, and 7,600 m (25,000 ft) in the tropics. Altocumulus and Altostratus are the main cloud types found in the middle levels of the troposphere.

The low étage is found from surface up to 2,000 m (6,500 ft) at all latitudes. Principal cloud types found in the low levels of the troposphere include stratocumulus, stratus, and small fair weather cumulus.

Several additional types usually form in the low or middle étages but typically extend into all three altitude levels as clouds with significant vertical extent. These include nimbostratus, towering cumulus congestus, and cumulonimbus.
