= Stratiformis =

Stratiformis may refer to:

- Altocumulus stratiformis, a cloud type
- Cirrocumulus stratiformis, a cloud type
- Stratiformis (sculpture), a public artwork by Jin Soo Kim
