= Cirrus castellanus cloud =

Type of cloud

Cirrus castellanus
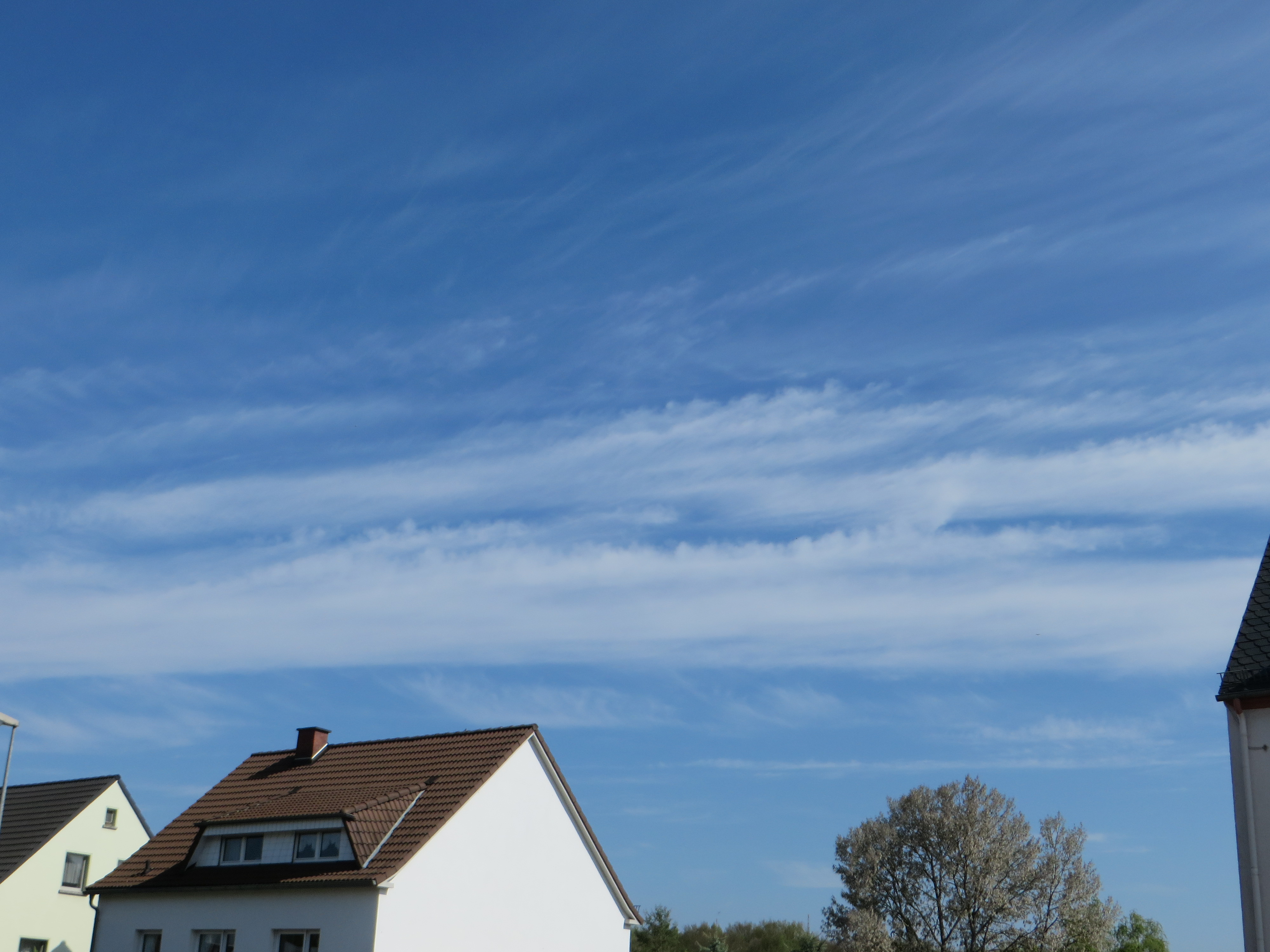
- Abbreviation: Ci cas
- Genus: Cirrus (curl)
- Species: castellanus (castle)
- Altitude: Above 6,000 m (Above 20,000 ft)
- Classification: Family A (High-level)
- Appearance: A series of dense lumps, or "towers" of cirrus, connected by a thinner base.
- Precipitation: No

Cirrus castellanus or cirrus castellatus is a species of cirrus cloud. Its name comes from the word castellanus, which means of a fort, of a castle in Latin. Like all cirrus, this species occurs at high altitudes. It appears as separate turrets rising from a lower-level cloud base. Often these cloud turrets form in lines, and they can be taller than they are wide. This cloud species is usually dense in formation.

== See also ==
- List of cloud types
