= Cumulus castellanus cloud =

Form of cumulus cloud

Cumulus castellanus
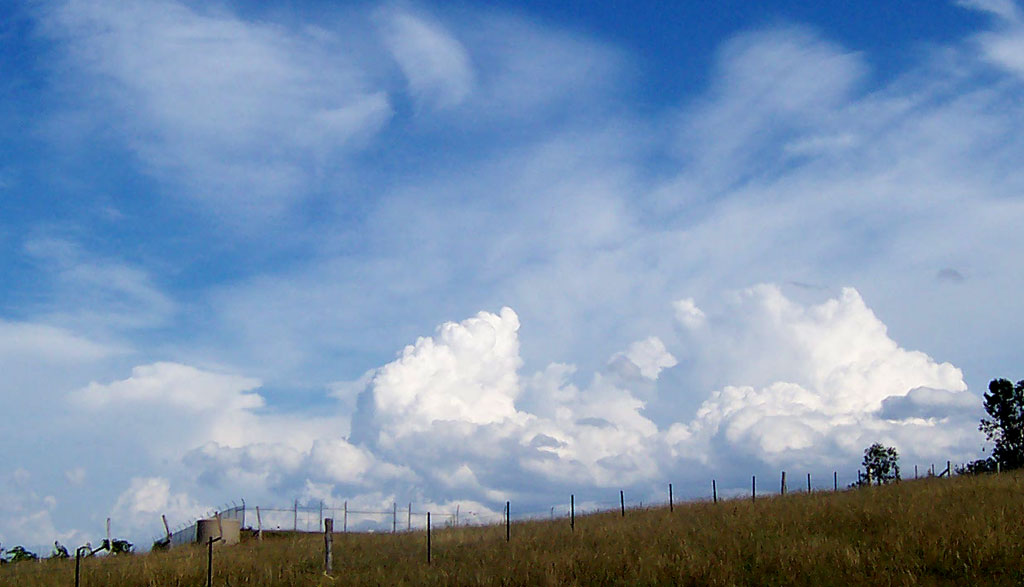
- Cumulus castellanus low on the horizon
- Appearance: Flat on the bottom, though has multiple "towers" on top
- Precipitation: Common rain, snow, or snow pellets

Cumulus castellanus (from Latin castellanus, castle) is an unofficial name of a species of cumulus cloud that is distinctive because it displays multiple towers arising from its top, indicating significant vertical air movement. It is a misnomer for cumulus congestus and correspondingly can be an indicator of forthcoming showers and thunderstorms. The World Meteorological Organization and the American Meteorological Society do not recognize cumulus castellanus as a distinct species, but instead classify all towering cumulus clouds as Cumulus congestus.
