= Cirrocumulus castellanus =

Type of cloud

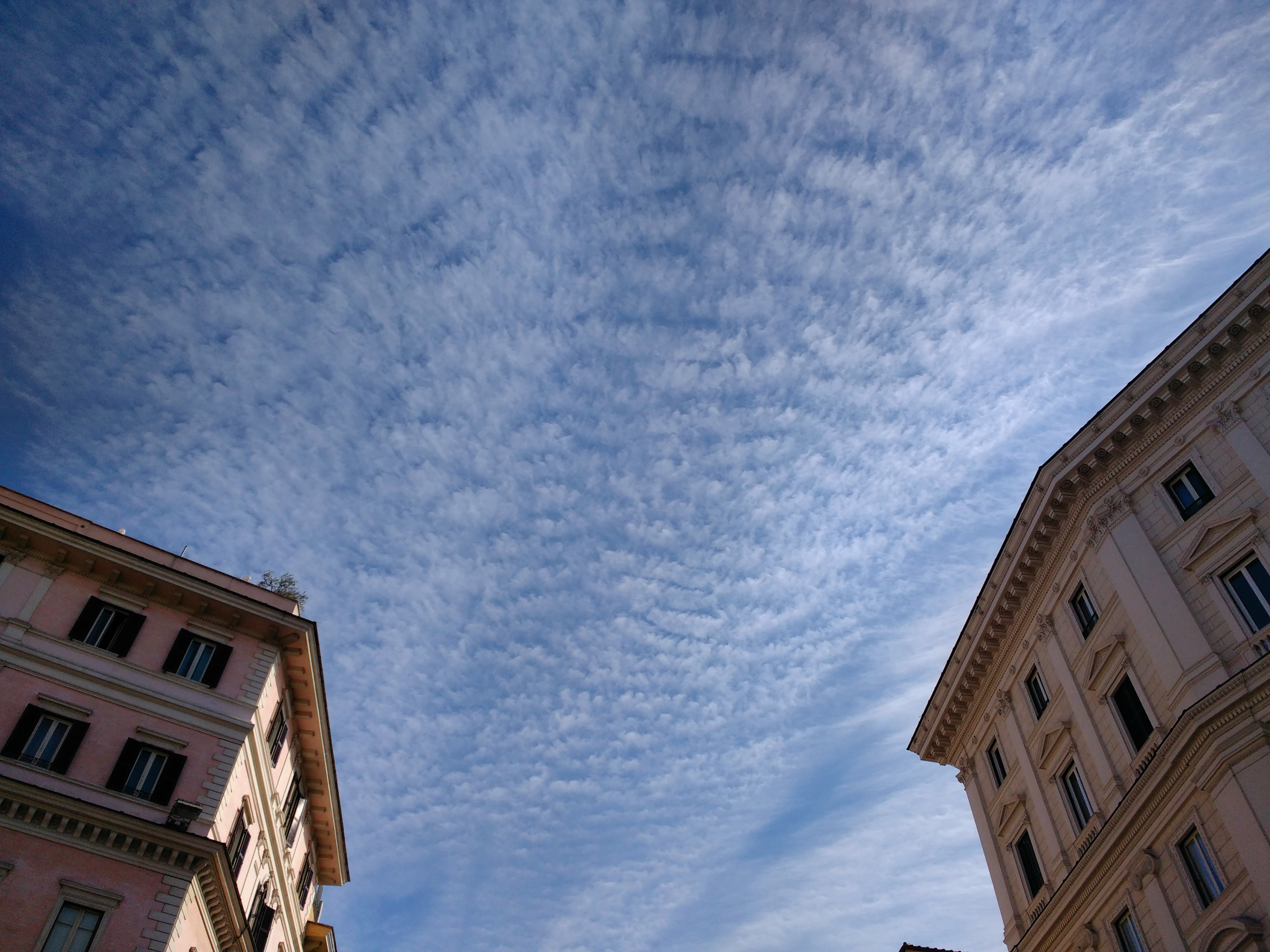
- Cirrocumulus castellanus undulatus (on the center)
- Abbreviation: Cc cas
- Genus: Cirro- (curl) -cumulus (heaped)
- Species: Castellanus (castle)
- Altitude: Above 6,000 m (Above 20,000 ft)
- Classification: Family A (High-level)
- Appearance: small, rounded turrets
- Precipitation: Virga only

Cirrocumulus castellanus or cirrocumulus castellatus is a type of cirrocumulus cloud. Castellanus is from the Latin meaning "of a castle". These clouds appear as round turrets that are rising from either a lowered line or sheet of clouds. Cirrocumulus castellanus is an indicator of atmospheric instability at the level of the cloud. The clouds form when condensation occurs in the base cloud, causing latent heating to occur. This causes air to rise from the base cloud, and if the air ascends into conditionally unstable air, cirrocumulus castellanus will form.

== See also ==
- List of cloud types
