= Altocumulus stratiformis =

Species of cloud

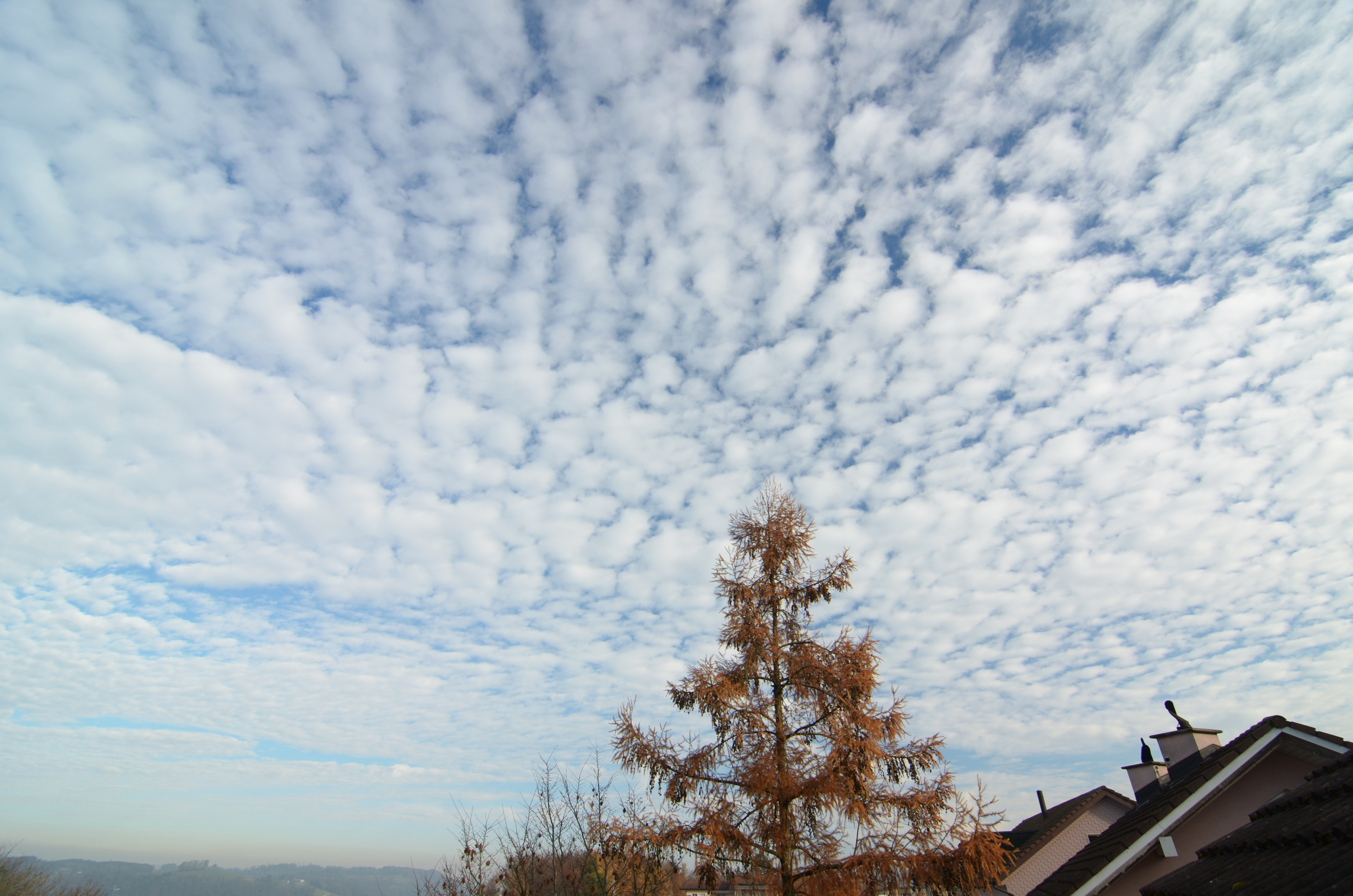
- Altocumulus stratiformis over Germany in 2011
- Abbreviation: Ac str
- Genus: Altocumulus (high, heaped)
- Species: stratiformis
- Variety: perlucidus; undulatus
- Altitude: 2,000 - 6,000 m (6,500 - 20,000 ft)
- Classification: Family B (Medium-level)
- Appearance: Patchy and shallow; often semi-transparent.
- Precipitation: Uncommon

Altocumulus stratiformis is the most common species of the Altocumulus genus of clouds. They tend to form broad layers of individual, cell-like clumps, often separated from each other, though they sometimes can coagulate into a larger individual cloud. They often have a vertical extent of less than 500 m (1,600 ft). Due to their formation dynamics, they are commonly associated with the imminent arrival of precipitation.

== Formation ==
The presence of stratiformis clouds in the mid-levels of the atmosphere is indicative of some instability at that level; atmospheric pressure falls, often associated with nearby systems of low pressure, can depress the altitude of stratiformis into the lower atmosphere, often evolving into Nimbostratus clouds, which precipitate. Altocumulus stratiformis clouds may also form when a cold front is approaching, due to the difference in air masses.
