= Stratocumulus castellanus cloud =

Mid-level cloud that indicates unstable air

Stratocumulus castellanus
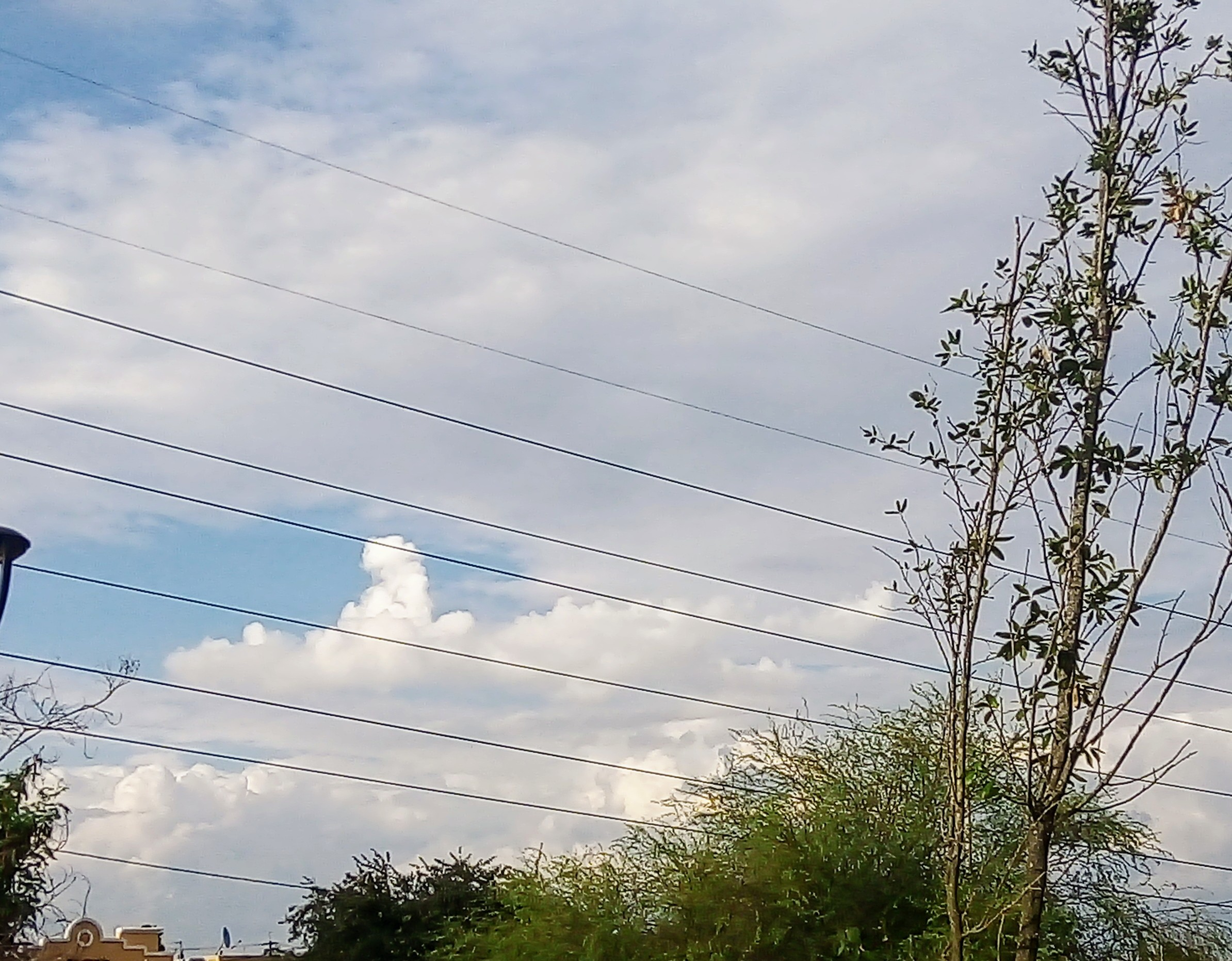
- Stratocumulus castellanus, with various turrets of very small size and one of a larger size
- Abbreviation: Sc cas
- Genus: Stratocumulus
- Species: Castellanus
- Altitude: Above 2,000 m (Above 6,560 ft)
- Appearance: small turrets
- Precipitation: Virga, and sometimes light rain

Stratocumulus castellanus or Stratocumulus castellatus is a type of stratocumulus cloud. Castellanus is derived from Latin, meaning 'of a castle.' Clouds of this type appear as cumuliform turrets vertically rising from a common horizontal cloud base. These turrets are taller than they are wide.

The presence of stratocumulus castellanus clouds indicates an increasingly unstable atmosphere, and seeing this type of cloud in the morning usually means that there is a possibility of thunderstorms forming later in the afternoon. In the right conditions, these clouds can grow into cumulus congestus clouds and, sometimes, into cumulonimbus clouds.
