= Altocumulus castellanus cloud =

Type of altocumulus cloud

Altocumulus castellanus
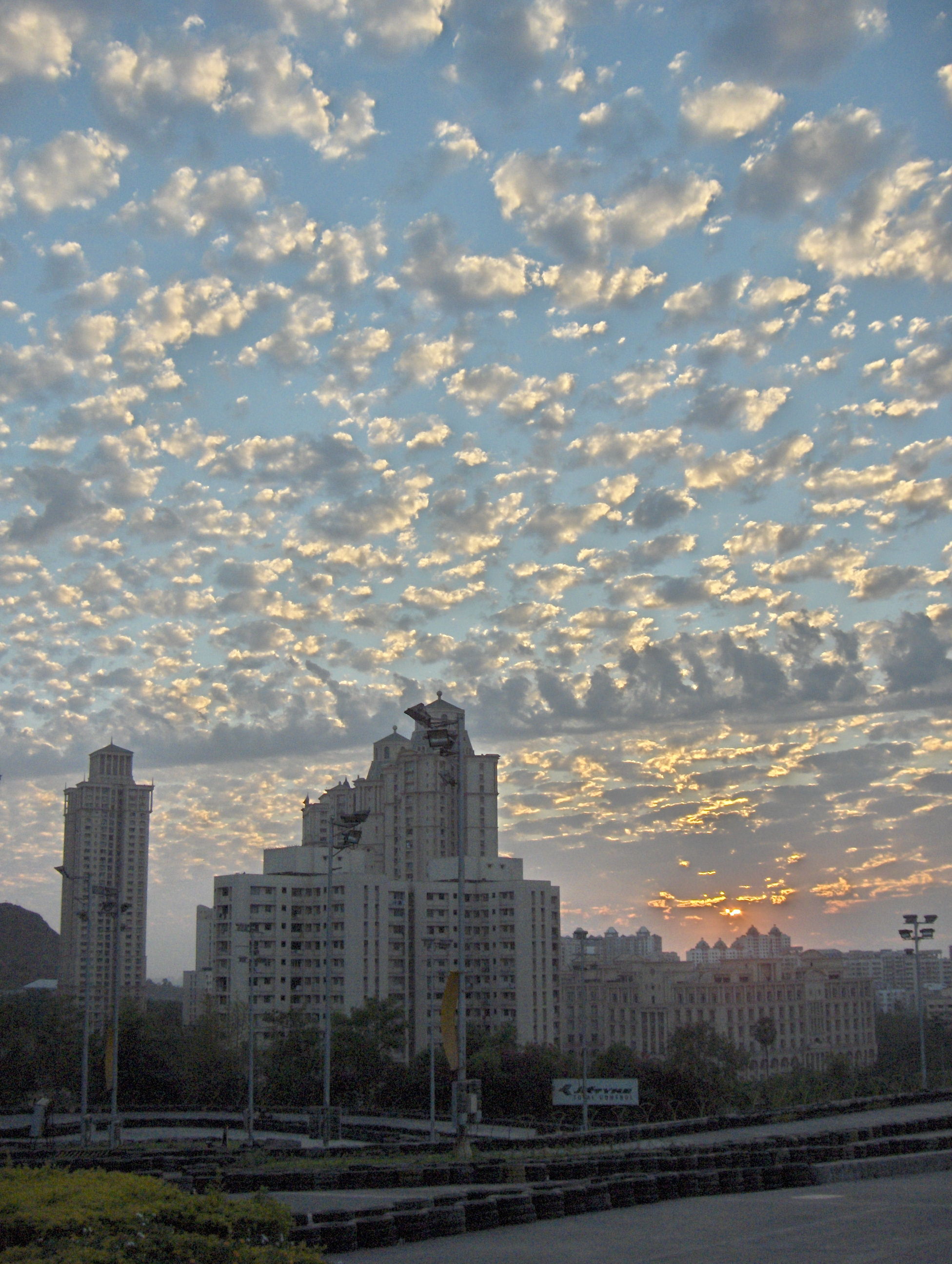
- Altocumulus castellanus clouds, with higher altocumulus floccus
- Abbreviation: Ac cas
- Genus: Altocumulus (high, heaped)
- Species: castellanus (castle)
- Variety: Duplicatus; Lacunosus; Opacus; Perlucidus; Radiatus; Translucidus; Undulatus
- Altitude: 2,000 - 6,000 m (6,500 - 20,000 ft)
- Classification: Family B (Medium-level)
- Appearance: Middle-altitude Stratocumulus clouds arranged in groups with rising towers, turrets.
- Precipitation: Virga only.

In meteorology, Altocumulus castellanus or Altocumulus castellatus (ACCAS) is a cloud type named for its tower-like projections that billow upwards from the base of the cloud. The base of the cloud can form as low as 2,000 metres (6,500 feet), or as high as 6,000 metres (20,000 feet). They are similar to cumulus congestus clouds, but at a higher level and with the cloud heaps joined at the base.

Castellanus clouds are evidence of mid-atmospheric instability and a high mid-altitude lapse rate. They may be a harbinger of heavy showers and thunderstorms and, if surface-based convection can connect to the mid-tropospheric unstable layer, continued development of Castellanus clouds can produce cumulonimbus clouds.

Altocumulus castellanus clouds are typically accompanied by moderate turbulence as well as potential icing conditions. For these reasons, flight through these clouds is often best avoided by aircraft.
