= Cloud species =

Set of terms used to describe the shape and structure of clouds

Cloud species are a set of fourteen terms used to describe the shape and structure of clouds. Each one has its name abbreviated to a three letter term. Cloud species are identified and published in the International Cloud Atlas.

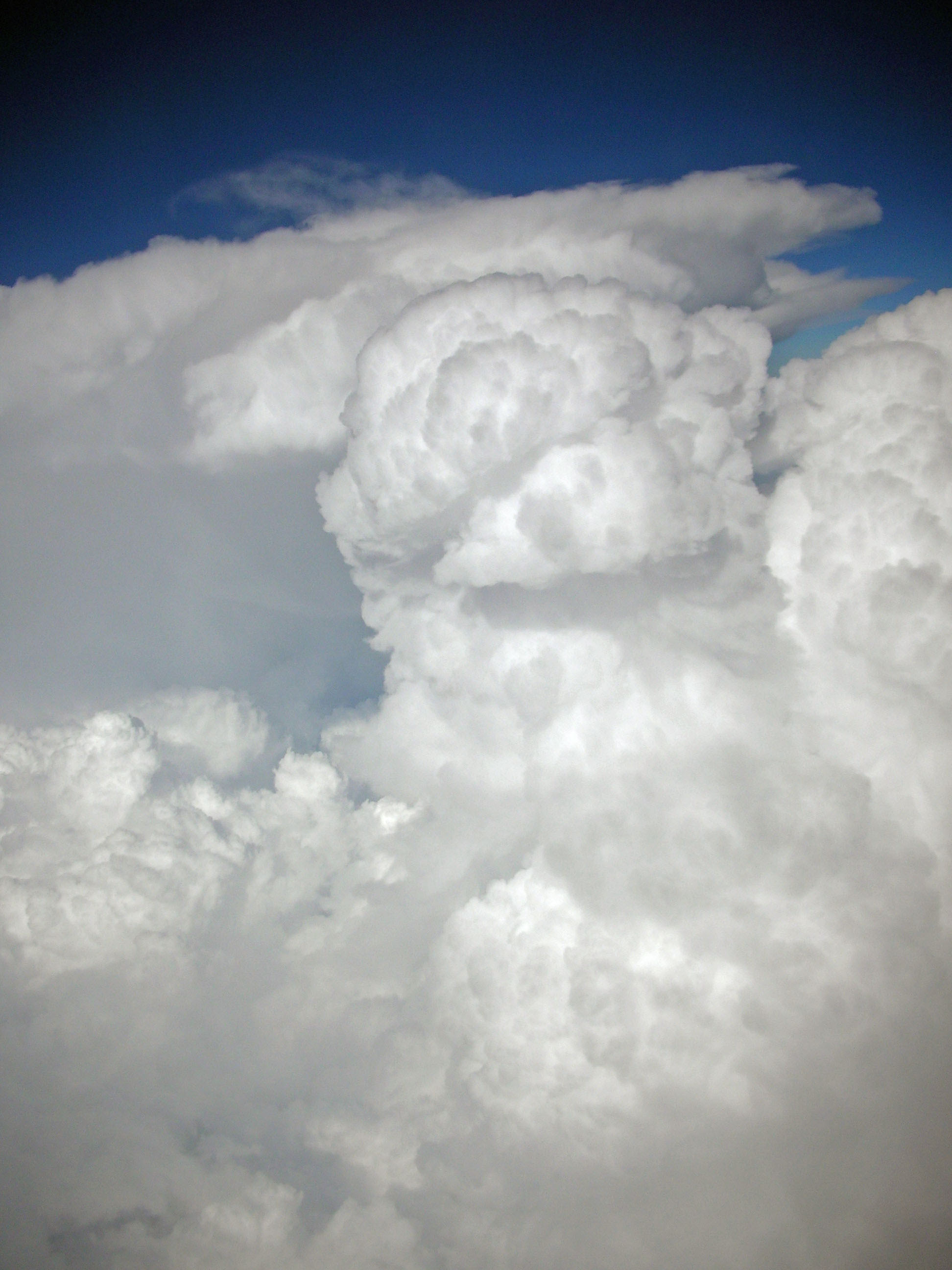
Cumulus congestus clouds in the foreground.

Species	Abbreviation	Description	Genera
Calvus	cal	Tops of clouds lose hard, rough appearance and become smooth	Cb
Capillatus	cap	Tops of clouds become distinctly fibrous or striated. Cirrus clouds are often in appearance	Cb
Castellanus	cas	Distinct turrets rising from a large base or line of cloud	Sc, Ac, Cc
Congestus	con	Great vertical height much larger than the base, shows vigorous growth with cauliflower like tops	Cu
Fibratus	fib	Fibrous appearance, with straight or uniform curves and no distinct hooks	Ci, Cs
Floccus	flo	Individual tufts of clouds with ragged bases and often with noticeable virga	Ac, Cc, Ci
Fractus	fra	Broken cloud with ragged bases and edges	Cu, St
Humilis	hum	Cloud with limited vertical height with a length much bigger than their height	Cu
Lenticularis	len	Lens or almond shaped clouds that are stationary in the sky	Sc, Ac, Cc
Mediocris	med	Clouds of moderate height that are around equal height and length, growing upwards	Cu
Nebulosus	neb	Featureless sheet of cloud with no structure	St, Cs
Spissatus	spi	Dense cloud appearing lighter shade of grey when viewed toward the sun	Ci
Stratiformis	str	Cloud in an extensive sheet or layer	Sc, Ac, Cc
Uncinus	unc	Distinctly hooked usually without a visible head	Ci

== See also ==
- List of cloud types
