= Flanking line (meteorology) =

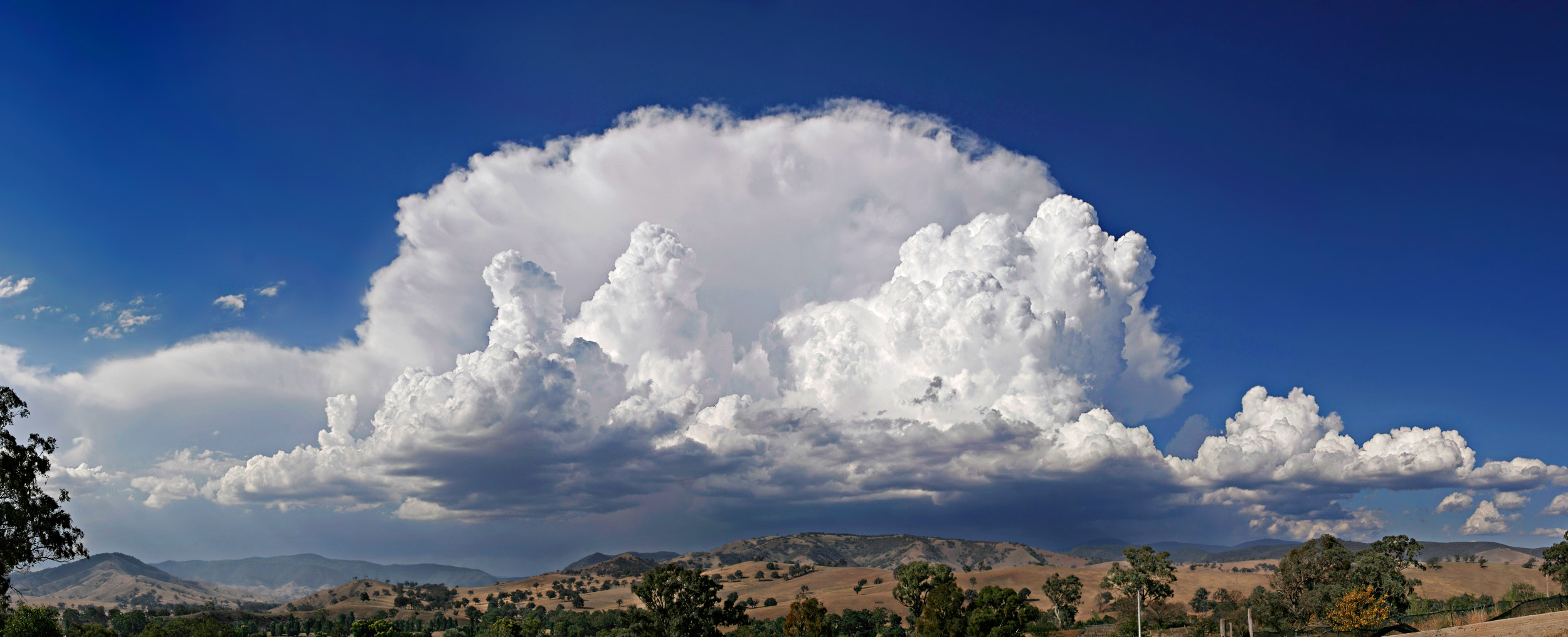
Structure of a flanking line. In the forefront, there are different cumulus species evolving from the cumulus mediocris to the cumulus congestus; behind, there are cumulonimbus calvus; finally, the huge cumulonimbus capillatus incus dominates the background showing a strong thunderstorm.

A flanking line is an area of cumulus congestus or small cumulonimbus that mark an area of widespread updrafts on the edge of strong thunderstorms. These flanking lines generally occur in the vicinity of supercell thunderstorms or large multicell thunderstorms.

== Structure of a flanking line ==
Flanking lines often exhibit a staircase-like appearance, with the tallest cells connected to the main cumulonimbus cloud.

The bases of the clouds in a flanking line are merged, and the foreground area typically lacks precipitation. In some instances, precipitation can be observed in the background, just above the horizon beneath the main cloud.

== Formation of the flanking line ==
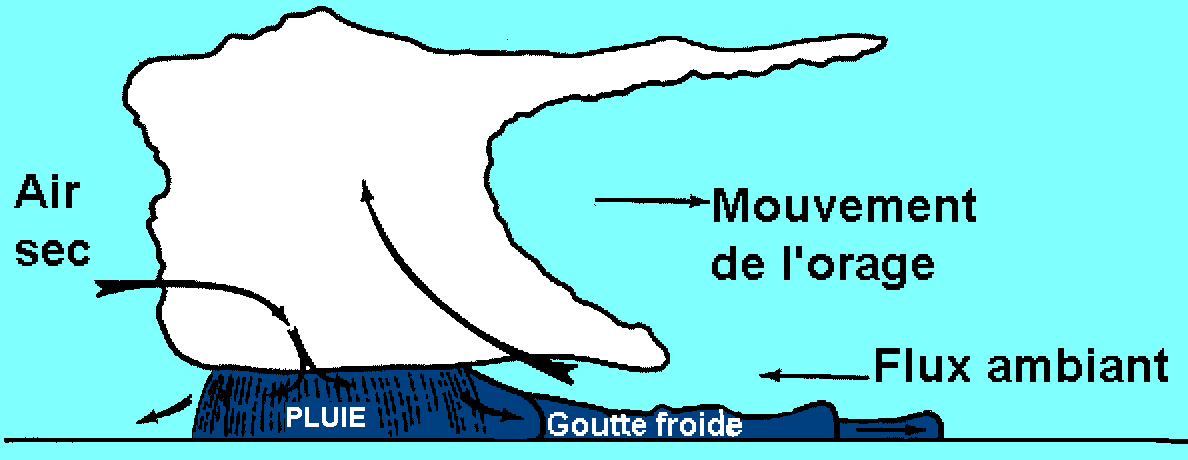
Formation of a flanking line generated by a downburst and the gust front

The flanking line is generated by the downburst that builds a cold air wedge beneath the warmer airmass in front of the thunderstorm. This warm air is forced upward and generates cumuliform clouds when the air column becomes saturated. These feeder clouds will merge with the main cumulonimbus and will regenerate the storm. These new feeder clouds are located, in the northern hemisphere, at the west or southwest of the main cloud.

Since these updrafts do not originate from the ground, the lifted condensation level will be higher than the convective condensation level associated with the main cumulonimbus. The cloud base of the flanking line is higher than the main cloud base. When the difference between these two levels increases, it indicates that the downburst has become stronger and thus that the severity of the thunderstorm has increased.

== Soaring ==
A widespread misconception in the world of soaring is that the updrafts associated with an incoming thunderstorm are almost always very strong and turbulent, which is most of the time incorrect. If one believes this myth, then he would consider it safe (from thunderstorms, at least) to fly in an area with plentiful weak to moderate updrafts, since the updrafts associated with thunderstorms are always supposed to be strong and turbulent.

In fact, the turbulence zone is located in and at the vicinity of the downdraft. The updrafts under the flanking line are smooth. The refutation of this myth is poetically expressed by Dominique Musto who says the following:

Pourtant malgré un ciel sombre et l'absence de soleil, les ascendances sont douces et généralisées dans tout le secteur. Quelque chose cloche ! Si nous ne réagissons pas très vite pour descendre, une main invisible risque de nous happer et de nous jeter en enfer ! (Translation: However, notwithstanding a dark sky and lack of sunlight, the updrafts are smooth and extended in the entire area. Something is wrong. If we do not react quickly and descend, an invisible hand is likely to grab us and throw us into hell!)

The author means that when flying under a flanking line, the updrafts will be widespread and smooth. Since the cells making the flanking line will fuse with the main cell, the soaring conditions will "improve", the updrafts will become stronger and stronger and the cloud base will become darker and darker.

Another clue of imminent danger is that the cloud base is significantly higher than the theoretical cloud base based on the difference between the temperature and dew point on the ground. Eventually, the pilot may inadvertently fly under the main cell. If the pilot ignores these harbingers, he may hit a tornado generated under a wall cloud and disintegrate his fragile skiff.

Notwithstanding the aforementioned, Dennis Pagen experimented the exploitation of a flanking line (that he calls a bench) with a hang glider along a severe thunderstorm. He was able to fly at high speed for 32 kilometres (20 mi). This flight was performed during the preliminaries of the 1990 hang glider world championship in Brazil. The author admits that this achievement was dubious.

== See also ==
- Cumulonimbus
- Cumulonimbus and aviation
