= Altocumulus cloud =

Genus of mid-level cloud

Altocumulus clouds
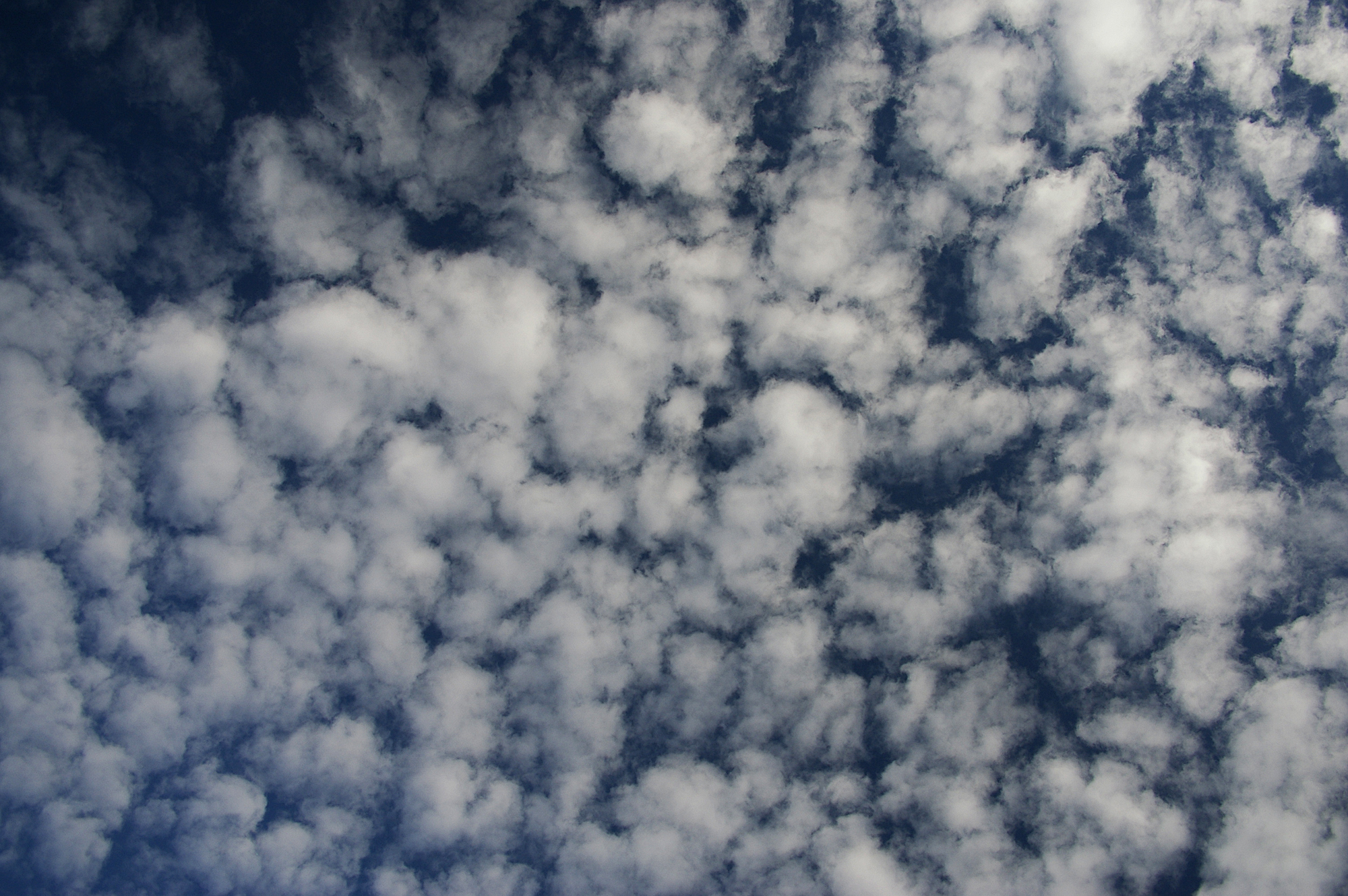
- Altocumulus cloud formation
- Abbreviation: Ac
- Genus: alto-, meaning high, and cumulo-, meaning heap
- Species: Castellanus; Floccus; Lenticularis; Stratiformis; Volutus
- Variety: Duplicatus; Lacunosus; Opacus; Perlucidus; Radiatus; Translucidus; Undulatus
- Altitude: 2,000–7,000 m (7,000–23,000 ft)
- Classification: Family B (Medium-level)
- Appearance: Middle-altitude Stratocumulus clouds arranged in groups or rolls. Has smaller clouds separate from each other
- Precipitation: Virga only

Altocumulus (from Latin altus 'high' and cumulus 'heaped') is a middle-altitude cloud genus that belongs mainly to the stratocumuliform physical category, characterized by globular masses or rolls in layers or patches – the individual elements being larger and darker than those of cirrocumulus and smaller than those of stratocumulus. However, if the layers become tufted in appearance due to increased airmass instability, then the altocumulus clouds become more purely cumuliform in structure.

Like other cumuliform and stratocumuliform clouds, altocumulus signifies convection. A sheet of partially conjoined altocumulus perlucidus is sometimes found preceding a weakening warm front, where the altostratus is starting to fragment, resulting in patches of altocumulus perlucidus between the areas of altostratus. Altocumulus is also commonly found between the warm and cold fronts in a depression, although this is often hidden by lower clouds.

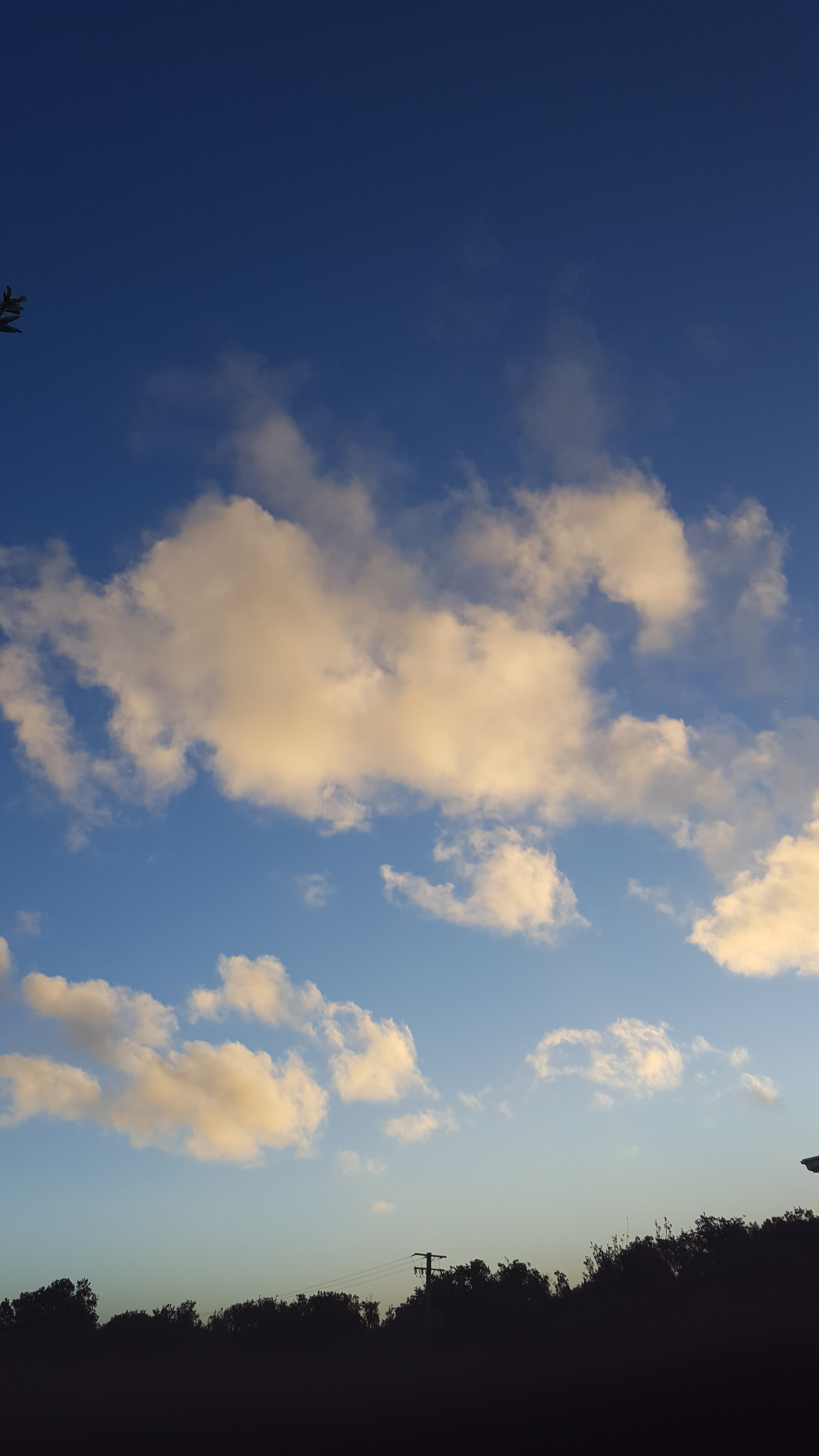
Some altocumulus floccus clouds take on a golden tinge due to Rayleigh scattering in Norah Head, New South Wales.

Towering altocumulus, also called altocumulus castellanus, frequently signals the development of thunderstorms later in the day, as it shows instability and convection in the middle levels of the troposphere, the area where cumulus congestus clouds can turn into cumulonimbus. It is therefore one of three warning clouds often recorded by the aviation industry, the other two being towering cumulus and cumulonimbus.

Altocumulus generally forms at about 2,000–6,100 m (6,600–20,000 ft) above ground level, a similar level to altostratus formations, and satellite photography reveals that the two types of cloud can create formations that can stretch for thousands of square miles. Extensive altocumulus formations, particularly if they take the form of undulatus, are often referred to as altocumulus mackerel sky.

== Subtypes ==
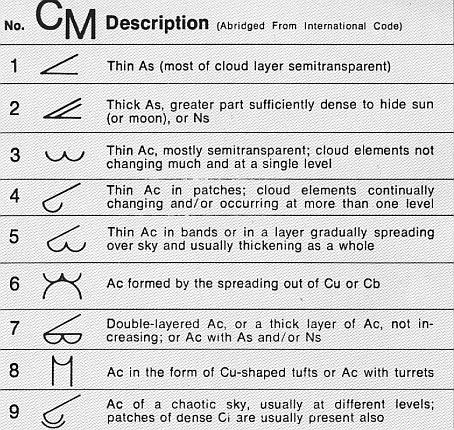
Middle cloud weather map symbols: Includes middle-étage and downward growing vertical.

- Species: Altocumulus has four species. The stratiformis species (Ac str) is composed of sheets or relatively flat patches of stratocumuliform cloud. The synoptic coding is determined by the predominant variety or occasionally by the genitus mother cloud. Altocumulus lenticularis (Ac len lenticular cloud) is a lens-shaped middle cloud which can resemble flying saucers and may occasionally be mistaken for "unidentified flying objects". This is formed by uplift usually associated with mountains. but usually with at least some grey shading. It is coded C_{M}4 on the SYNOP weather observation. Grey shading is also seen with altocumulus castellanus (Ac cas), a turreted middle cloud that can achieve significant vertical development and signals increasing air mass instability. It is nevertheless usually classified as middle rather than vertical and is coded C_{M}8. The floccus species (Ac flo) is a tufted middle cloud which is also associated with greater instability. It shares the same code C_{M}8. Chaotic altocumulus, which is typically poorly defined with multiple species or transitional forms arranged in several layers, is coded C_{M}9.

- Opacity-based varieties: Altocumulus stratiformis has three opacity-based varieties: translucidus (C_{M}3), perlucidus (C_{M}3 or 7 depending on predominant opacity), and opacus (C_{M}7). Varieties based on opacity are not commonly associated with the species lenticularis, castellanus, or floccus.
- Pattern-based varieties: Radiatus (arranged in parallel bands) is sometimes seen with the stratformis and castellanus species. Altocumulus stratiformis radiatus of any opacity is coded C_{M}5 if it is increasing in amount. The duplicatus or undulatus varieties are occasionally seen with the stratiformis and lenticularis species. Altocumulus stratiformis duplicatus is coded C_{M}7 if it is not overridden by another coding of higher importance. Lacunosus is very occasionally associated with altocumulus of the species stratiformis, castellanus, or floccus.

- Precipitation-based supplementary feature: Altocumulus often produces virga but usually not precipitation that reaches the ground.
- Cloud-based supplementary feature: Mamma caused by localized downdrafts in the cloud layer are occasionally seen with altocumulus. A newly recognized type is the asperitas feature that is characterized by chaotic undulations caused by severe wind shear.
- Genitus Mother clouds: Altocumulus stratiformis cumulogenitus or cumulonimbogenitus can form when the middle or upper part of a towering free convective cloud begins to spread horizontally due to a loss of convective lift. It is coded C_{M}6.
- Mutatus mother clouds: Altocumulus can form due to the complete transformation of cirrocumulus, altostratus, nimbostratus, or stratocumulus.

== Gallery ==
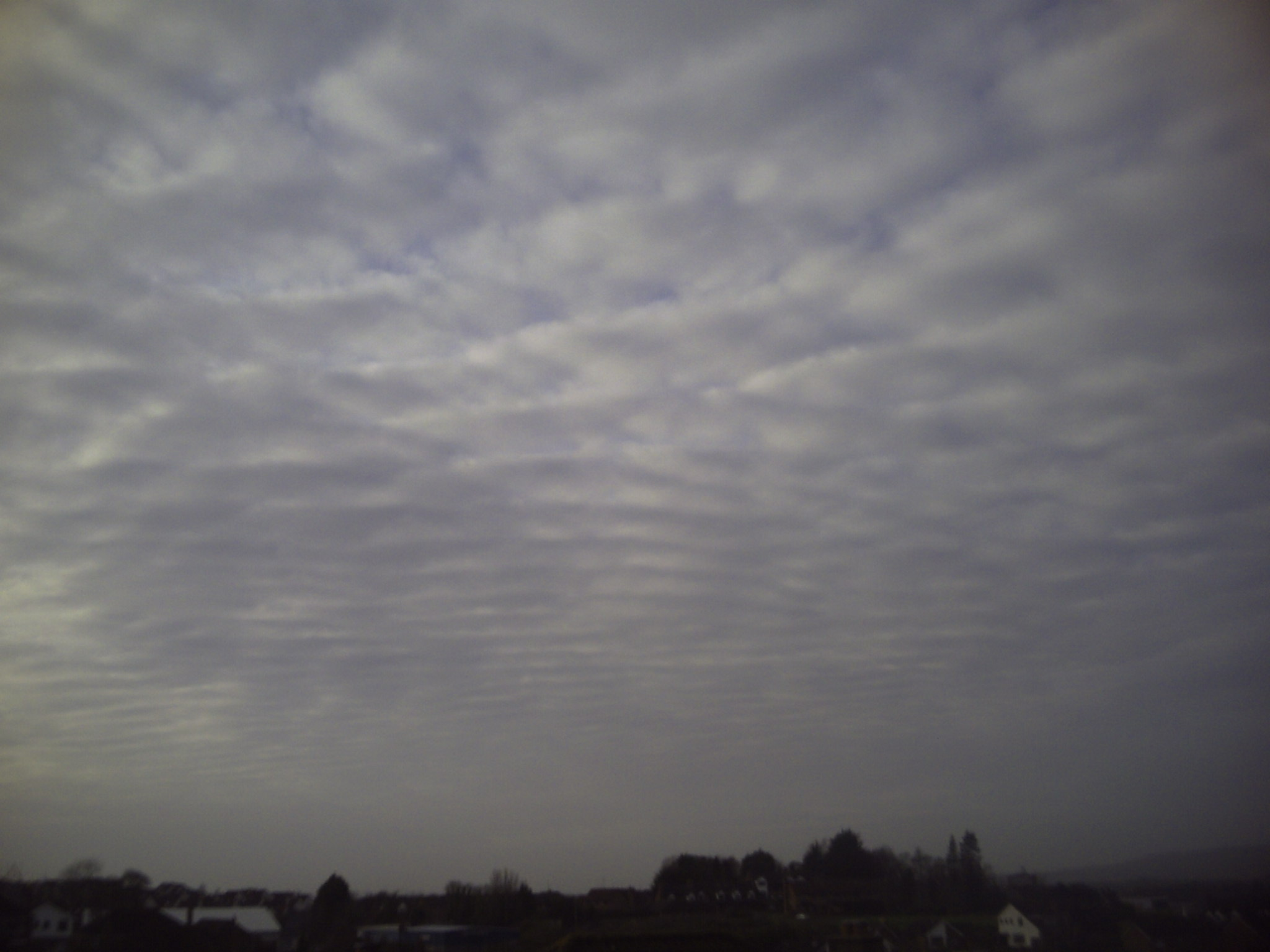
Altocumulus perlucidus

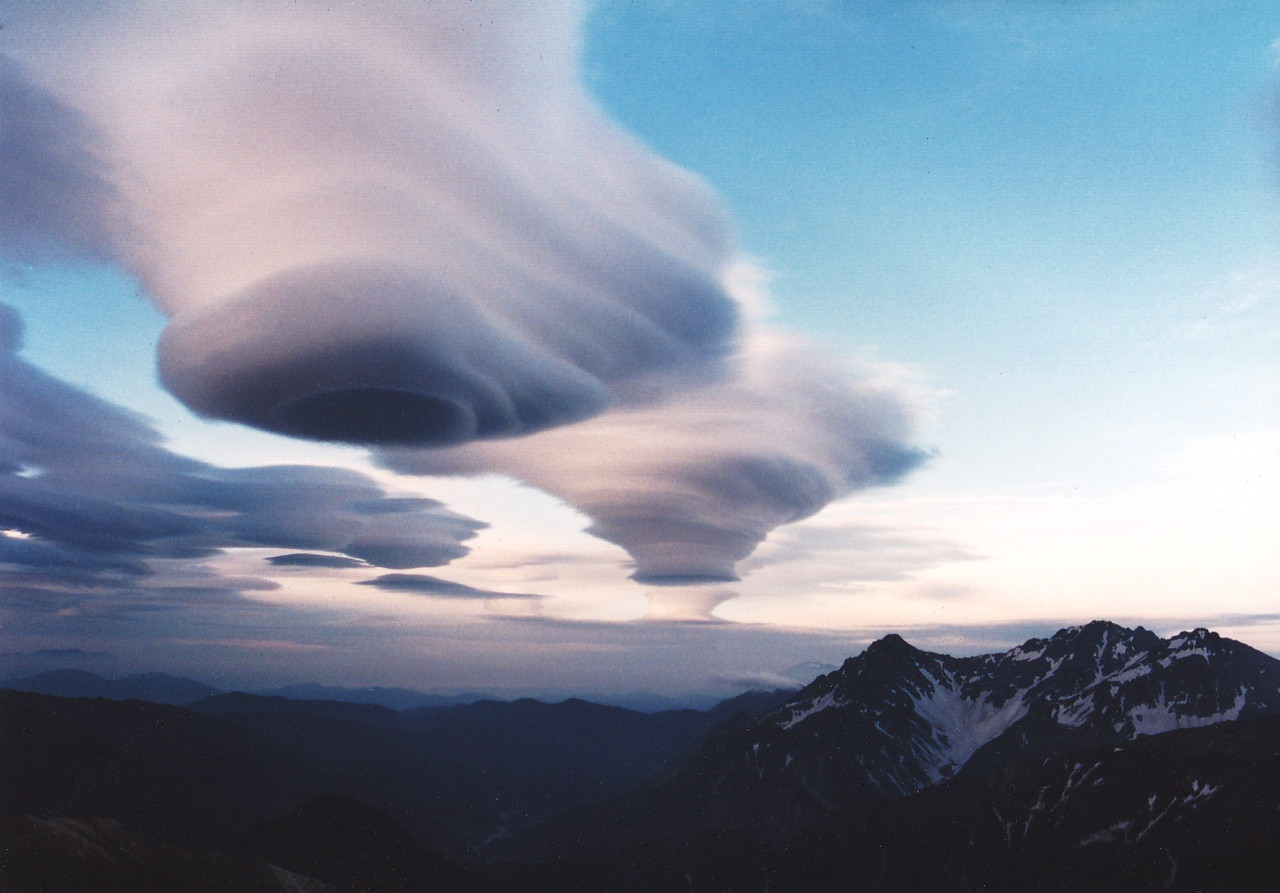
Altocumulus lenticularis

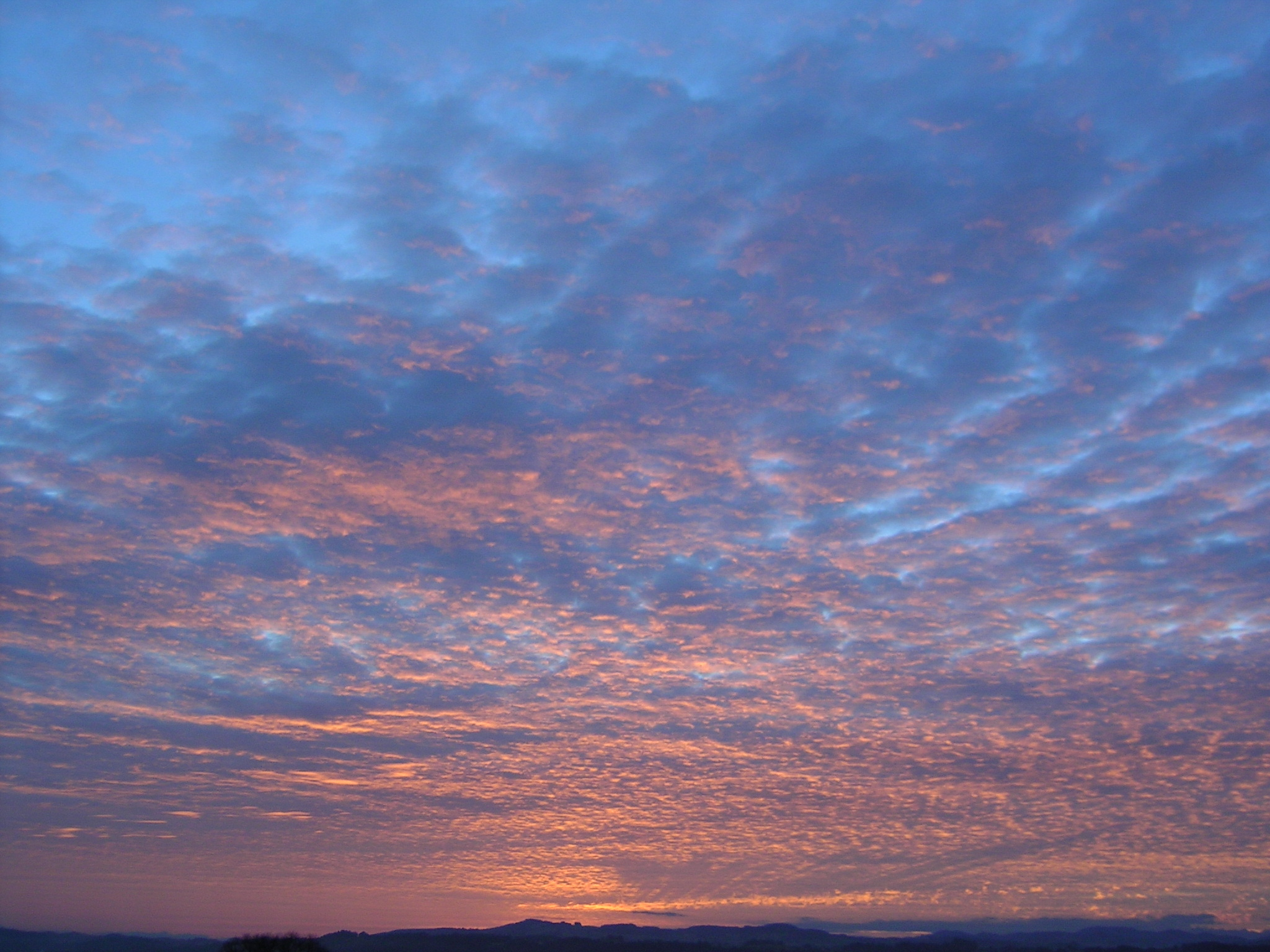
Altocumulus at sunset

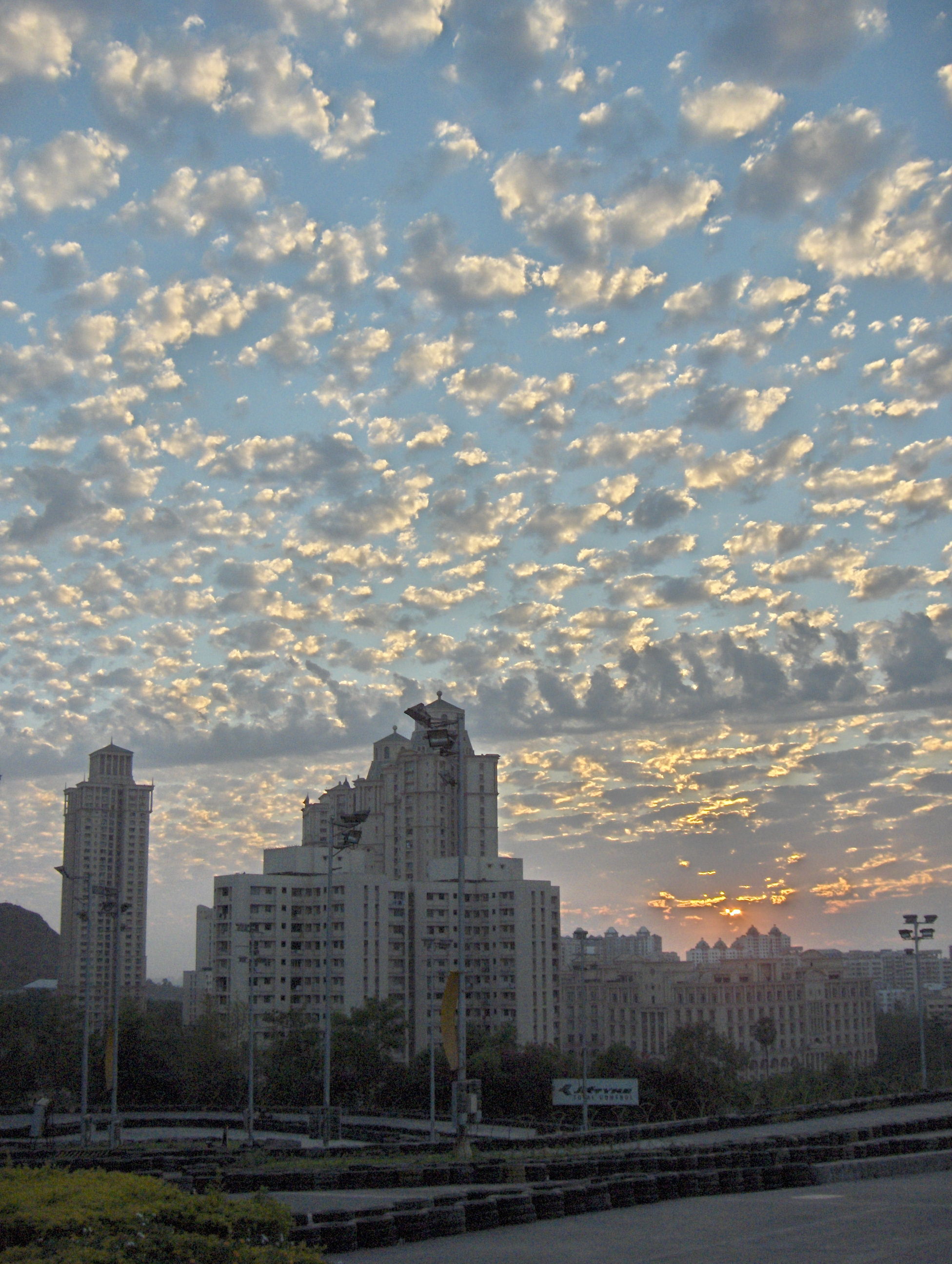
Altocumulus floccus with line of castellanus

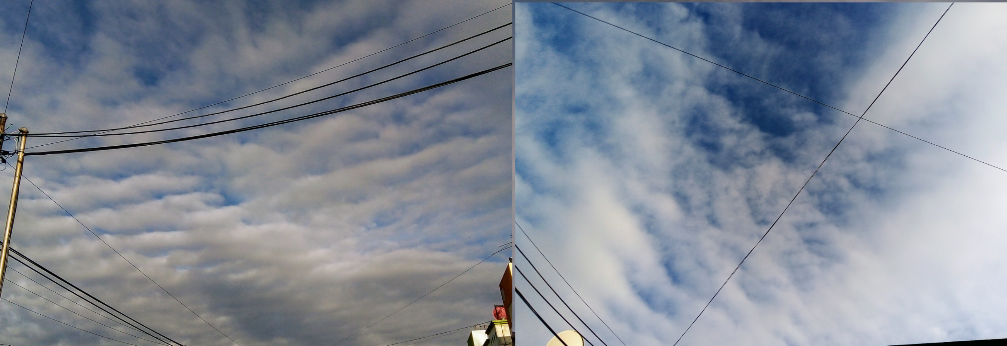
Altocumulus undulatus during a cold front

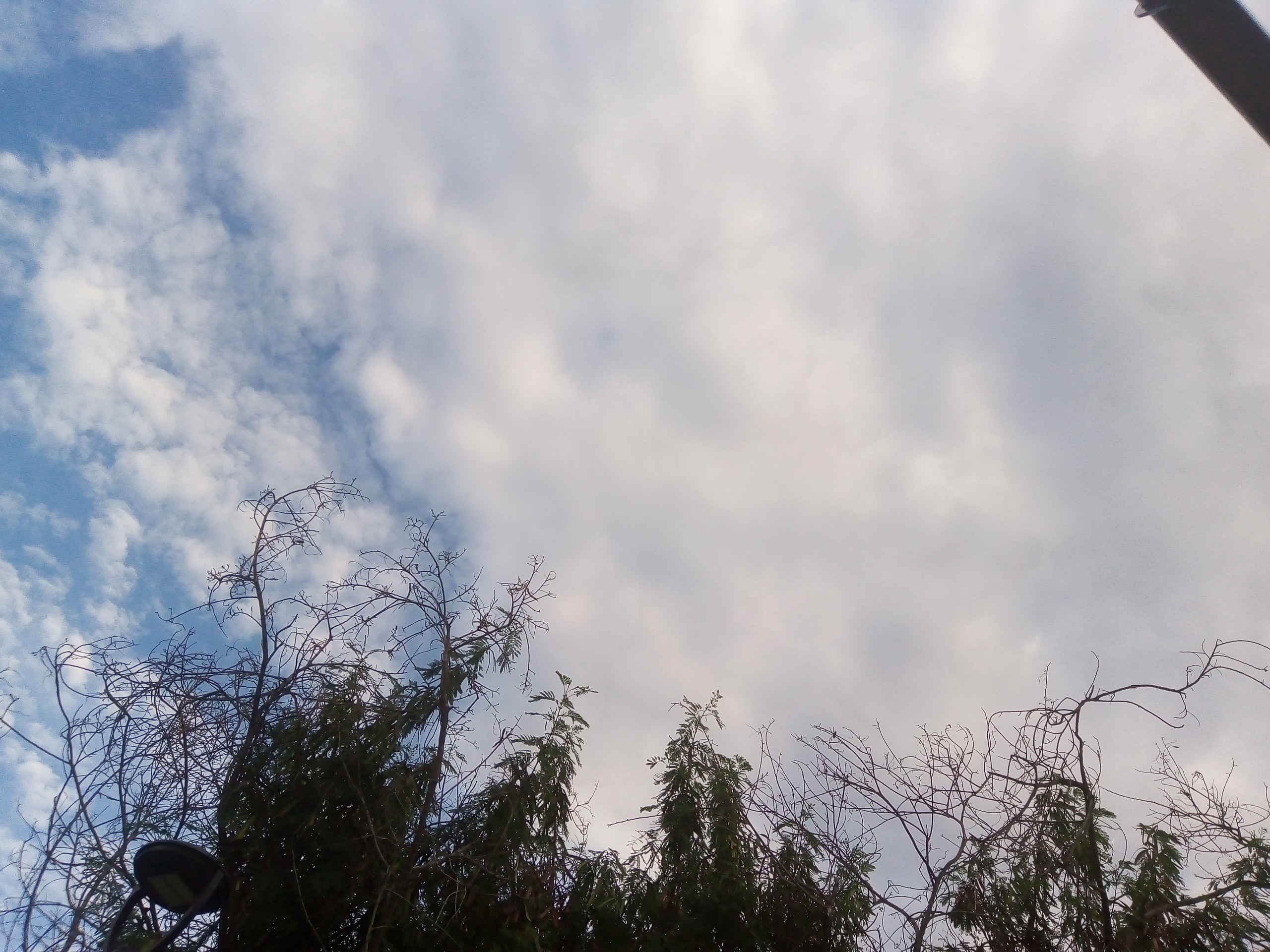
Altocumulus mammatus

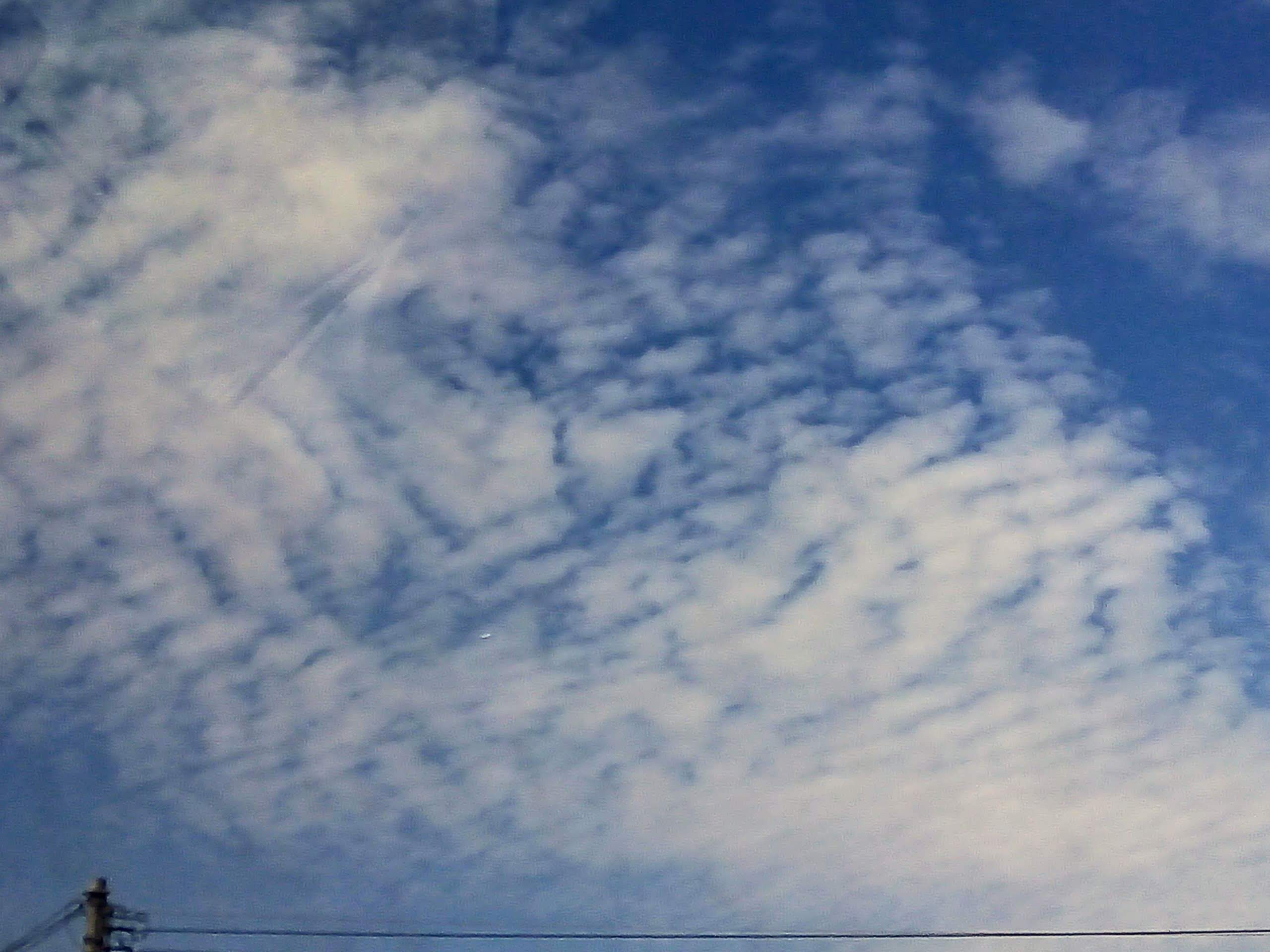
Altocumulus stratiformis radiatus

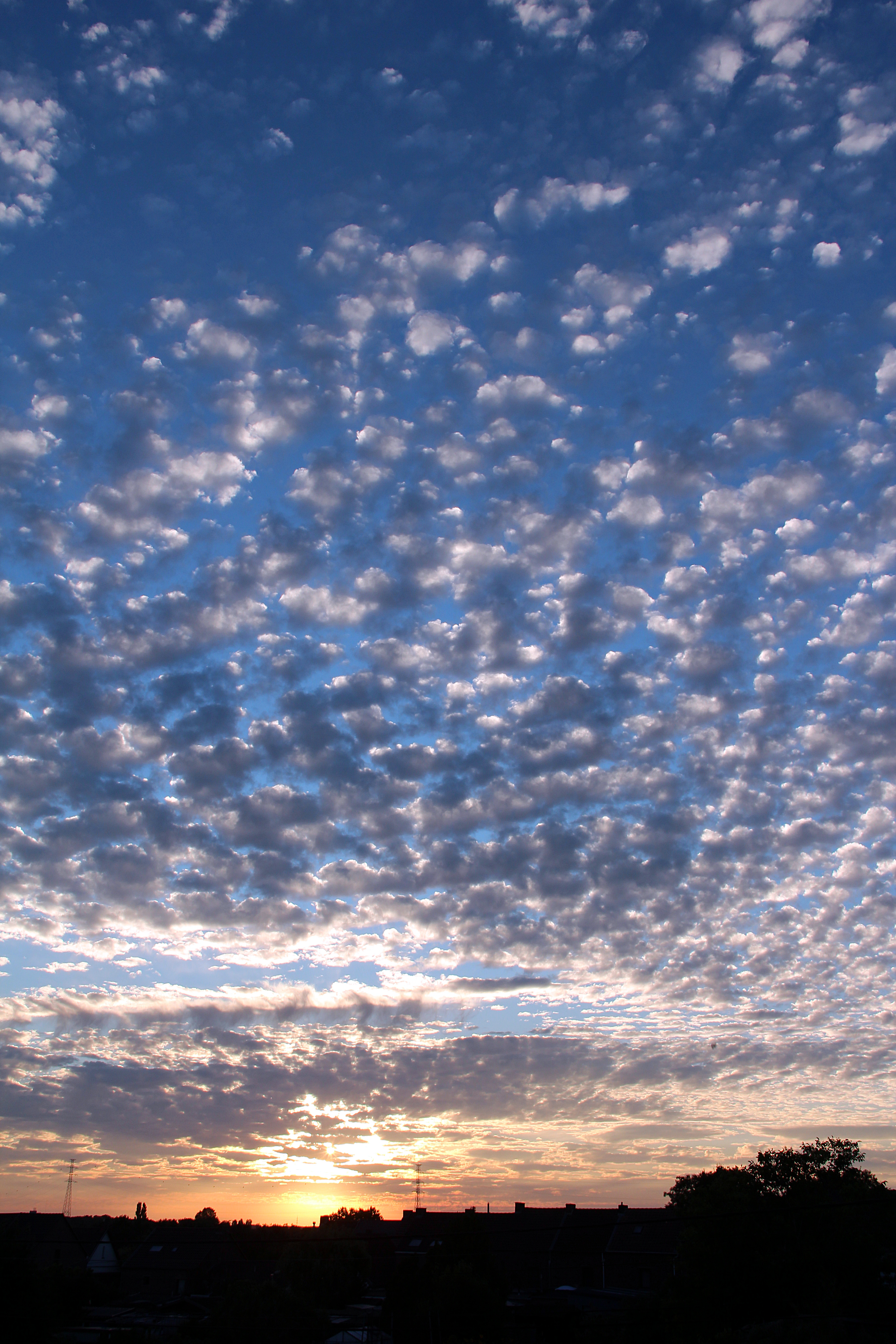
Alto-cumulus flocus seen in Belgium on the 29 July 2026.

== See also ==
- Atmospheric convection
- Mackerel sky
