= Altocumulus floccus =

Type of cloud

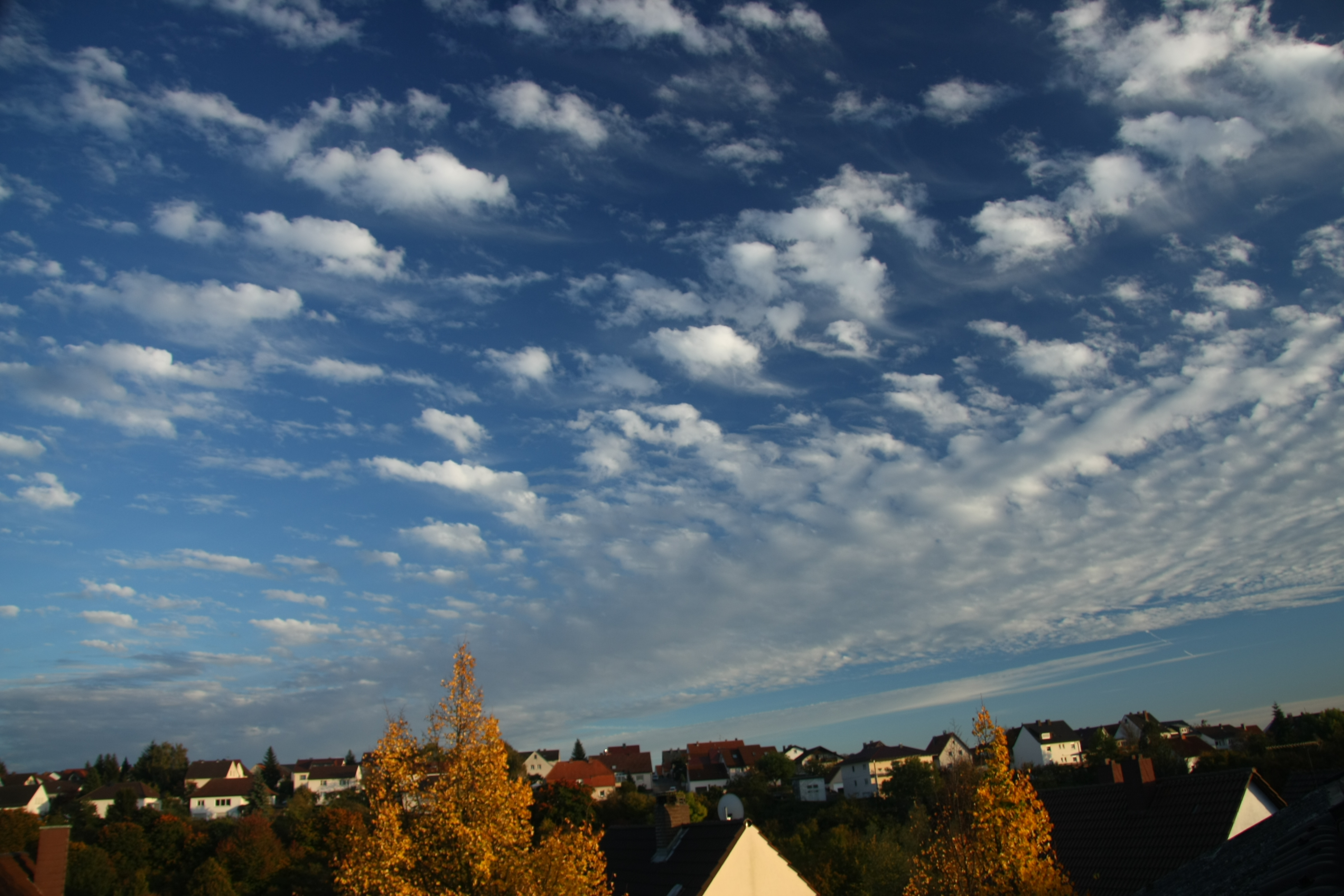
- Altocumulus floccus over Germany in October 2010
- Abbreviation: Ac flo
- Genus: Altocumulus (high, heaped)
- Species: floccus
- Altitude: 2,000–6,000 m (6,500–20,000 ft)
- Classification: Family B (Medium-level)
- Appearance: Often present in diffuse patches; whitish or dark, and the bases are sometimes not all at the same level.
- Precipitation: Virga only.

Altocumulus floccus is a cloud type named for its tuft-like, wooly appearance. The base of the cloud can form as low as 2,000 metres (6,600 ft), or as high as 6,000 metres (20,000 ft). They often form in clusters, or patches, and bases can vary in height with differing atmospheric conditions within the PBL. They are similar to Altocumulus castellanus, but often have a shallower vertical extent in comparison.

Floccus clouds form when in the presence of conditional, often shallow, mid-level instability. On some occasions, such as the presence of a deeper unstable layer, these clouds can grow large enough to develop into thunderstorms.
