= Trade wind cumulus cloud =

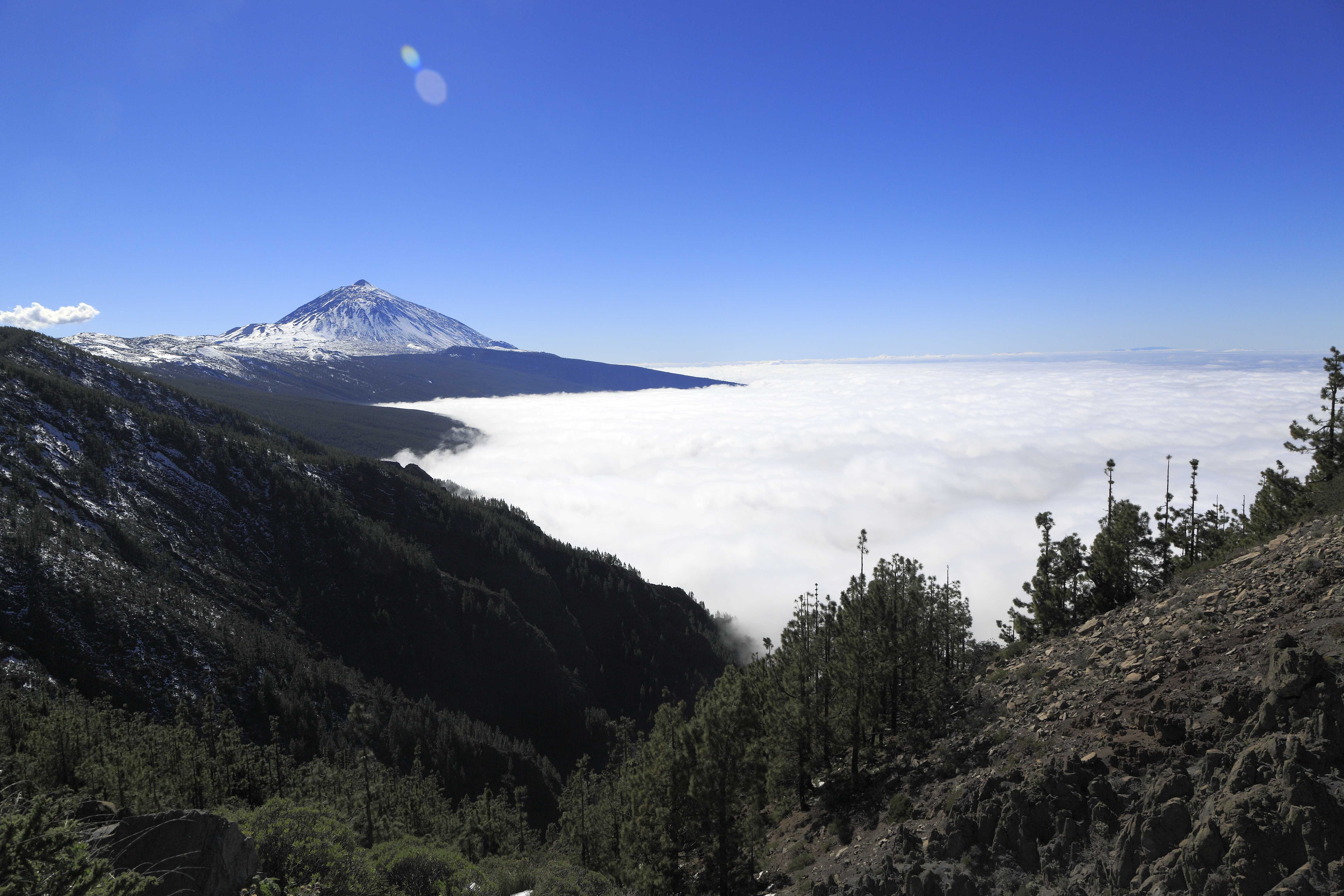
- Trade wind clouds reaching up to about 1400 m altitude over the west of Tenerife, on the left the Mount Teide.
- Genus: Cumulus
- Altitude: 500-2000 m (1500-7000 ft)
- Classification: Family C (Low-level)
- Appearance: Low-altitude, fluffy
- Precipitation: normally none, at best some drizzle

Trade wind cumulus (or trade cumulus) clouds are formed by cooling and moisture absorption of the dry trade winds over the relatively cold sea surface in the eastern parts of the oceans. These are clouds, typically Cumulus humilis or Cumulus mediocris, which are considered as fair weather clouds.

Characteristic for trade wind clouds is the uniform height of the upper cloud limit, which typically lies between 1000 and 1500 meters and thus indicates the altitude of the trade wind inversion. Due to orographic lift at mountains, the clouds can also rise higher, but the trade wind inversion also limits a further rise here, so that even in this case a light drizzle can occur at best. At night, the trade wind clouds usually dissipate again, especially over land.

== Details of the development ==
The trade wind inversion is strongest in the eastern areas of the tropical oceans. Here, the sinking air masses of the Hadley or Walker circulation and the sea breeze ensure that the subsidence inversion lies particularly deep. Below this, a thin, very uniform layer of stratocumulus clouds forms in the marine atmospheric boundary layer. In these areas, the water surface temperatures are relatively low due to the upwelling of cooler, deeper water. As a result of the low-lying inversion and cool water temperature, moisture content increases within the marine boundary layer and, with saturation, clouds form over a wide area of the eastern tropical oceans. Further west, away from the coast, the subsidence weakens, the sea surface temperature rises and the clouds in the boundary layer become more cumulus-like, but often remain covered by stratocumulus at first. Even further downwind, the stratocumulus clouds disappear and the classic trade wind clouds develop, i.e. puffy cumulus clouds with active vertical transport of moisture and heat. These become the predominant phenomenon and extend over a large region until extensive convection dominates in the Convergence Zones.

== Significance for the climate ==
Trade wind clouds are found over about 20 percent of the Earth's surface. Since they reflect sunlight on their upper surface, they reduce the warming of the Earth's surface by solar radiation. Numerical climate models have great difficulty with the simulation of low clouds over the subtropical oceans, in particular the trade wind clouds. Previously, it was expected that these clouds would decrease due to global warming and thus strengthen the latter, meaning that this development represents a positive feedback loop. However, a study published in 2022 based on empirical data concludes that the trade wind clouds are less sensitive to climate change than previously assumed.
