= Stratus silvagenitus =

Type of stratus cloud

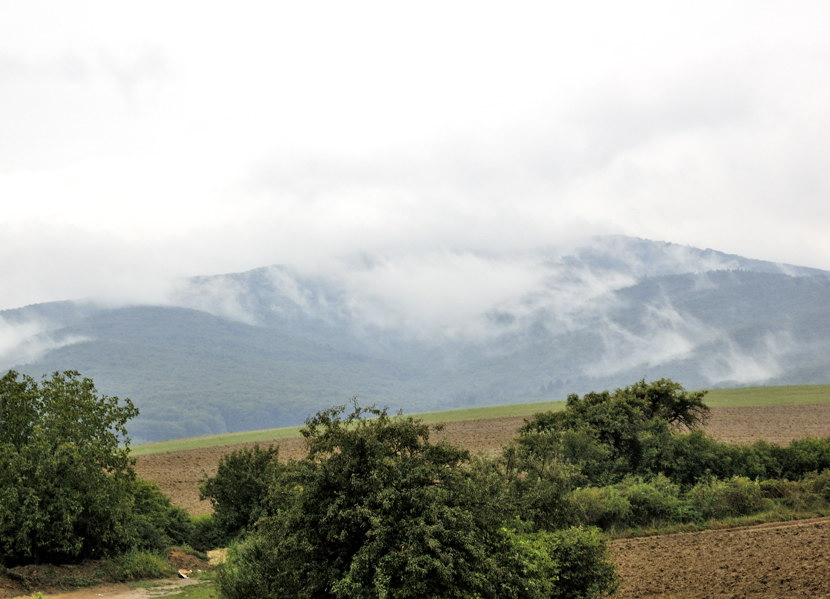
- Stratus fractus silvagenitus clouds over the Považský Inovec mountains
- Abbreviation: st slvg
- Genus: stratus
- Variety: silvagenitus (created from forest)
- Altitude: relative to tree height - various/0 m (various/0 ft)
- Appearance: uniform or ragged fog over forested areas
- Precipitation: None

Stratus silvagenitus is a type of cloud and fog. The word silvagenitus is a scientific Latin coinage meaning "created from forest".

== Appearance ==
This fog type forms over forested areas which are experiencing high relative humidity levels, for example, after precipitation has passed, through evaporation and/or evapotranspiration of moisture from inside leaves.

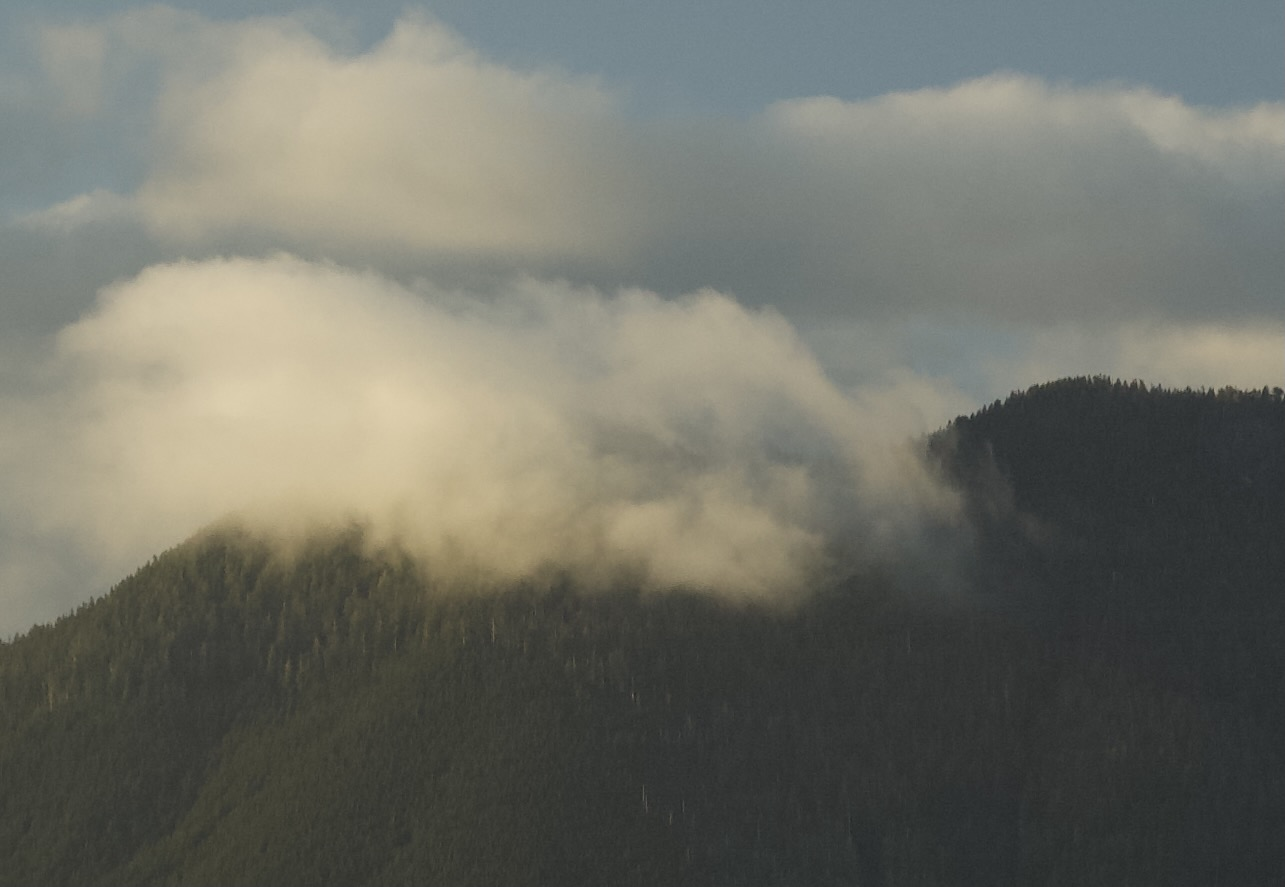
Silvagenitus cloud formed over a coastal mountain.

If the cloud is uniform, it is called a "stratus" silvagenitus cloud, if the cloud is ragged and wispy, then it is called a "stratus fractus" silvagenitus cloud. These clouds typically form near the ground.

The silvagenitus cloud variety only exists in the stratus cloud species due to its mechanism of formation, as it is driven by forced increase of dew point instead of convective adiabatic cooling as occurs within cumulus clouds.

== See also ==
- Cloud forest
