= Cloud forest =

Type of rainforest

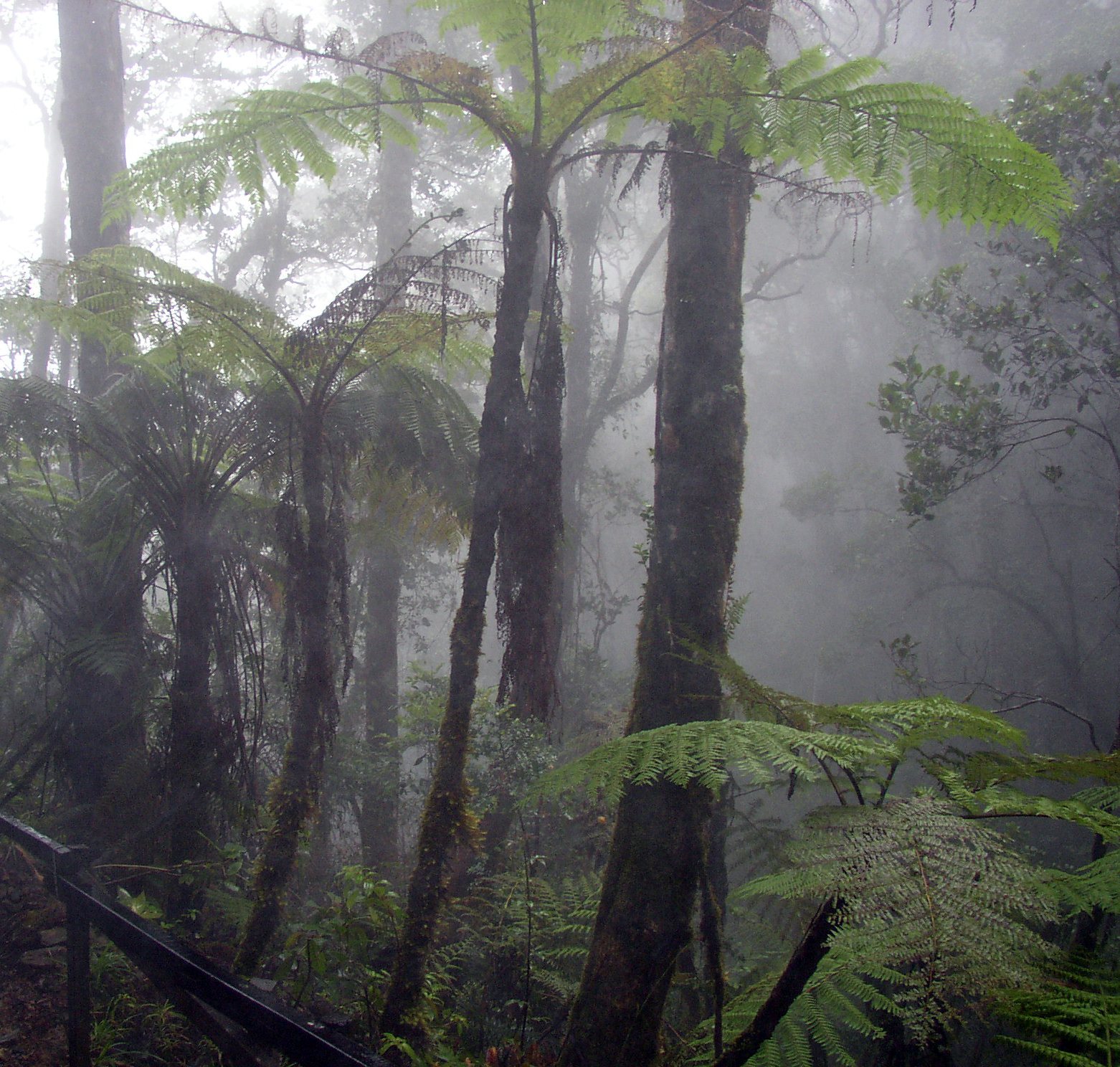
Tree ferns in a cloud forest on Mount Kinabalu, Borneo

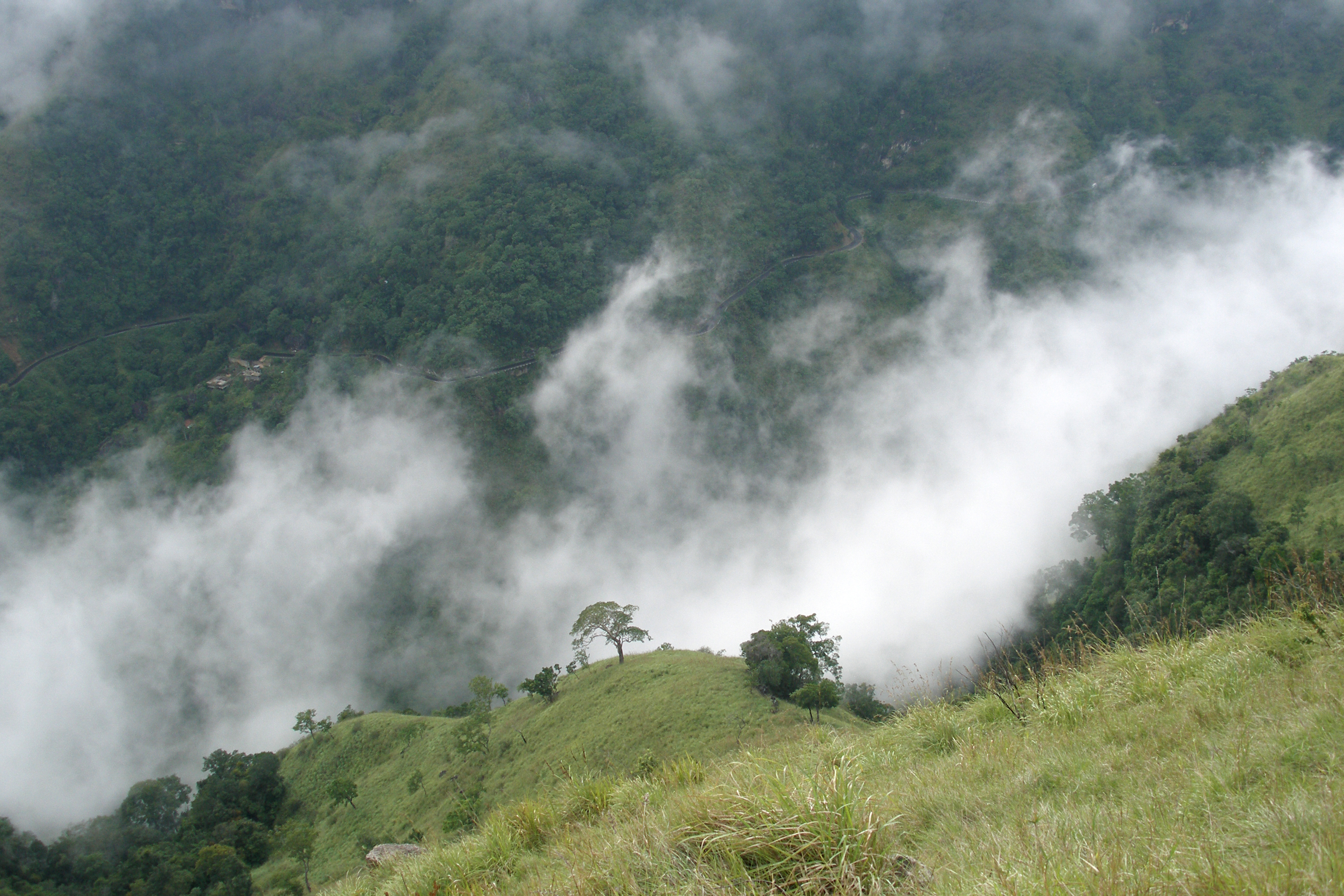
Stratus silvagenitus clouds in Uva Province, Sri Lanka

A cloud forest, also called a water forest, primas forest, or tropical montane cloud forest, is a generally tropical or subtropical, evergreen, montane, moist forest characterized by a persistent, frequent or seasonal low-level cloud cover, usually at the canopy level, formally described in the International Cloud Atlas (2017) as silvagenitus. Cloud forests often exhibit an abundance of mosses covering the ground and vegetation, in which case they are also referred to as mossy forests. Mossy forests usually develop on the saddles of mountains, where moisture introduced by settling clouds is more effectively retained. This ecosystem is rare globally, but its natural beauty, moderate climate, and easy accessibility makes it highly attractive for tourism. The presence and history of colonial hill stations, and the allure of ecotourism and adventure travel, have also contributed to a degree of romanticization.

Cloud forests form under a variety of conditions, one of which involves winds carrying moisture-laden air against mountain slopes, causing the air to rise and cool through orographic lift until it condenses into persistent low clouds. This mechanism sustains the characteristically high humidity that defines the biome and sets it apart from other montane forest types.

These forests are among the most biodiversity-rich biomes in the world, harboring a disproportionately large number of endemic plant and animal species that depend on the stable, moist microclimate they provide. They also play a critical role in regional hydrology: fog drip, condensation that forms on foliage and drips to the ground, can supplement annual precipitation substantially, making cloud forests vital freshwater sources for downstream communities and ecosystems.

Despite their ecological importance, cloud forests are under threat from deforestation, agricultural encroachment, and climate change. Approximately 2.4% of global cloud forest cover was lost between 2001 and 2018, with losses in some regions exceeding 8%. Because cloud formation is tightly linked to local temperature and atmospheric conditions, rising global temperatures are projected to push optimal cloud forest climates to higher elevations, effectively shrinking available habitat over the coming decades.

== Climate ==
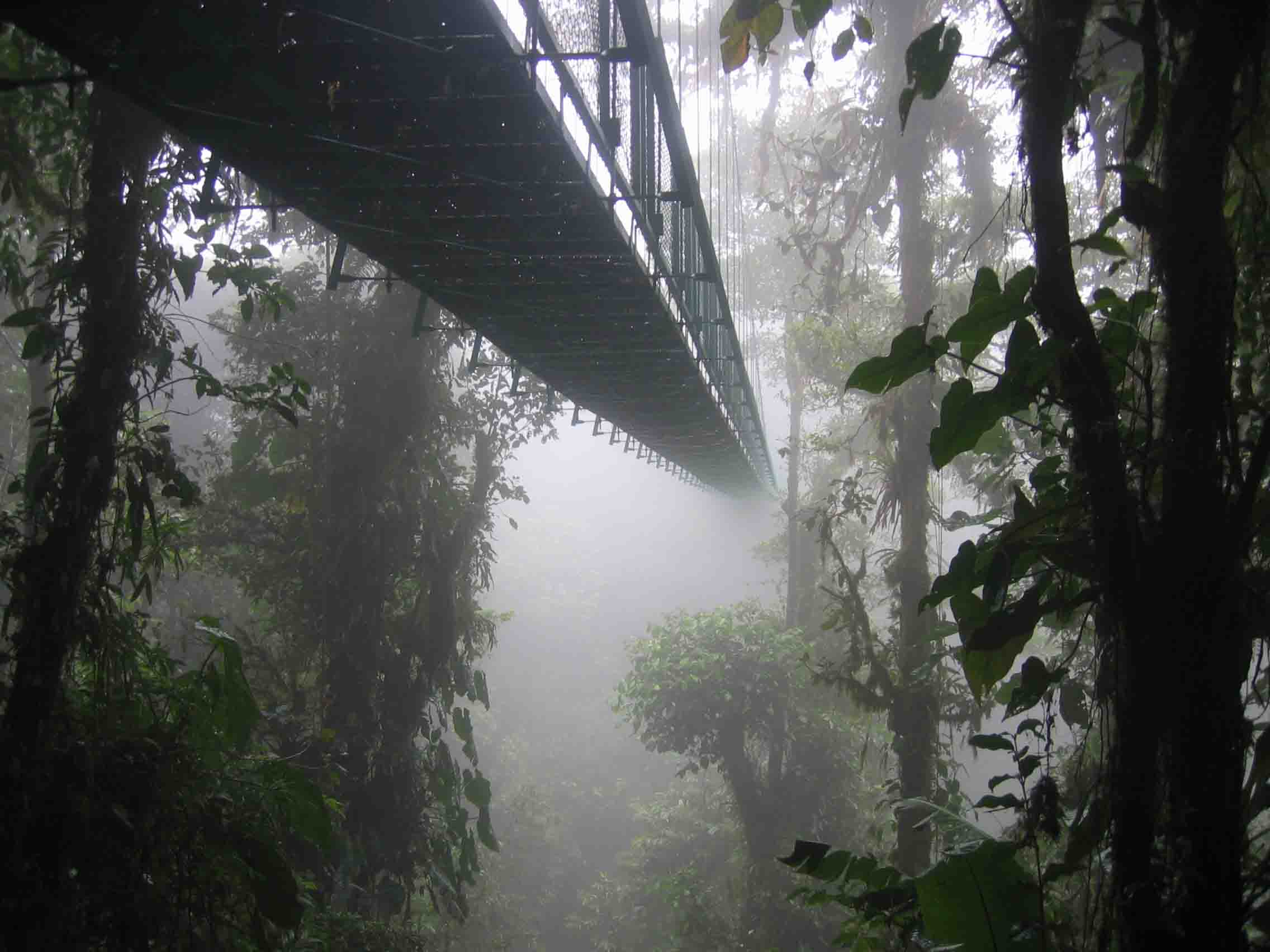
One of the hanging bridges of the Sky walk at the Monteverde Cloud Forest Reserve in Monteverde, Costa Rica disappearing into the clouds

Cloud forest distribution is governed by the mixing of latitude, proximity to the ocean, topography, and elevation. Most tropical cloud forests occur between latitudes 25°N and 25°S and at elevations ranging from approximately 500 m to 4,000 m above sea level. Within this broad range, suitable conditions are typically restricted to a relatively narrow altitudinal band where atmospheric temperature and humidity permit persistent cloud formation at vegetation level.

The defining climatic mechanism is orographic lift: prevailing winds carry moisture-laden air from the ocean toward mountain ranges, and as the air is forced upward it cools at the dry adiabatic lapse rate until it reaches the dew point, at which point water vapor condenses into cloud. The elevation at which this condensation occurs, the cloud base, is where cloud forests characteristically develop. Once cloud envelops the canopy, direct sunlight is reduced, lowering evapotranspiration and creating the persistently humid conditions in which cloud forest vegetation thrives.

Within cloud forests, a significant proportion of the moisture available to plants arrives not as rainfall but as fog drip: water droplets from the cloud condense on the needles and leaves of trees, coalesce into larger drops, and fall to the ground below. In seasonally dry climates, this fog drip can effectively double the amount of moisture reaching the forest floor compared with rainfall alone, and in wetter climates it augments wet-season precipitation by roughly 10%.

Annual rainfall in cloud forest zones ranges from approximately 500 to 10,000 mm per year, and mean annual temperatures typically fall between 8 and 20 °C (46.4–68 °F). The relatively cool temperatures suppress rates of decomposition and evapotranspiration, contributing to the waterlogged, peat-rich soils that are characteristic of the biome.

== Characteristics ==
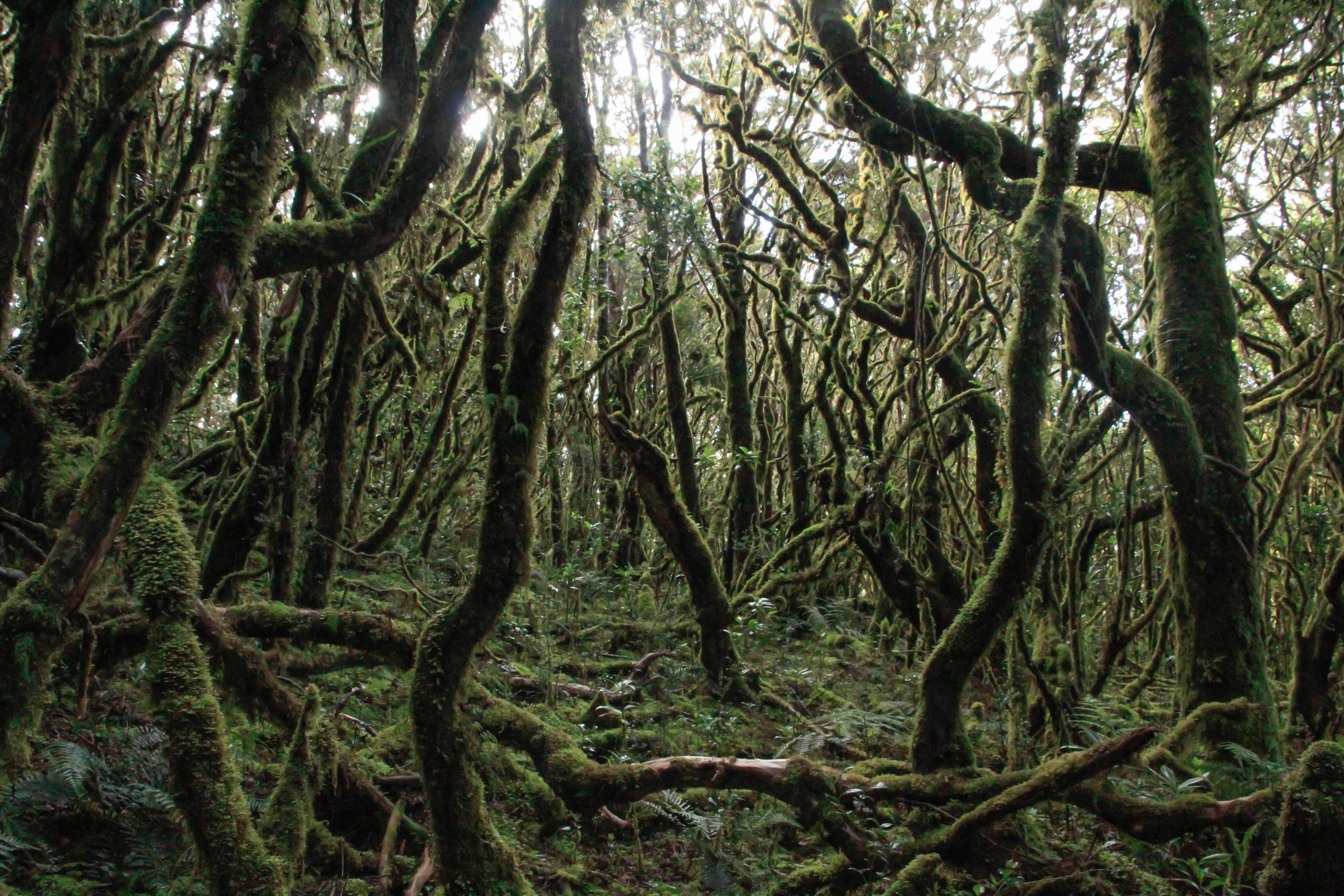
Bryophyte-covered mossy forest at Mount Dulang-dulang, Philippines

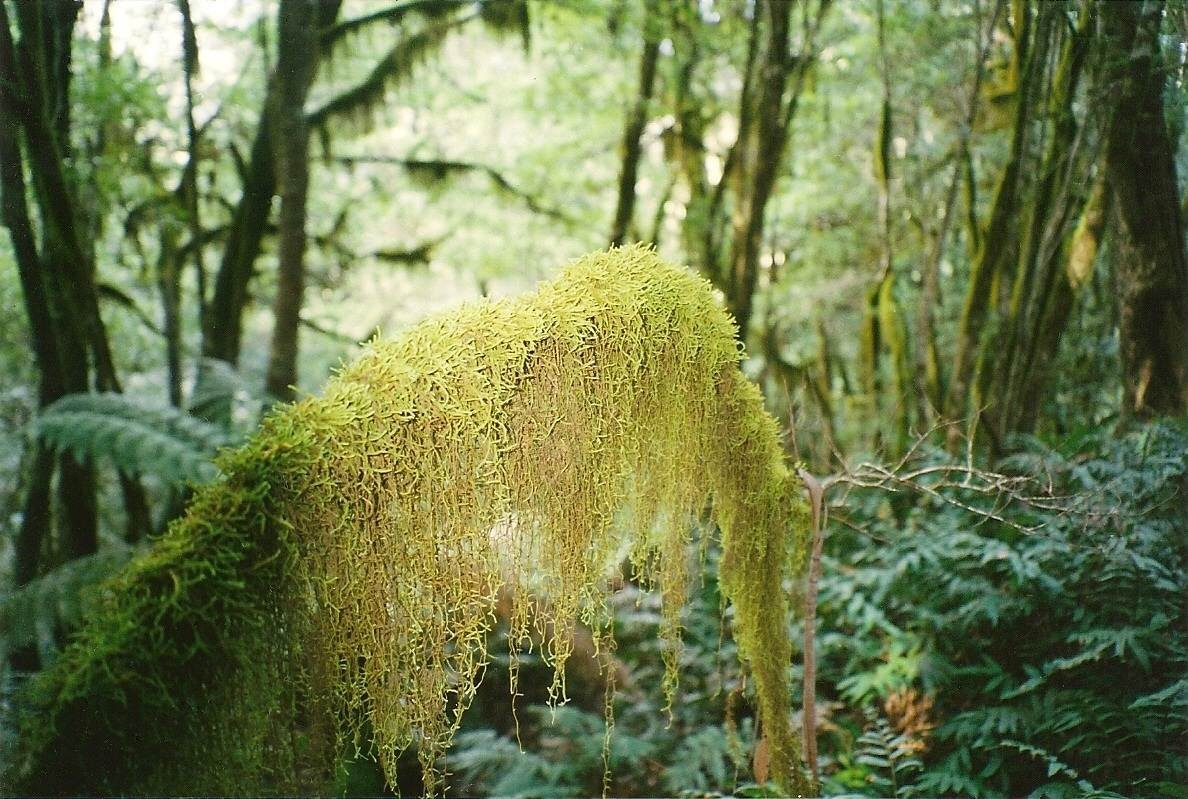
Hanging moss in a cool temperate rainforest at Budawang National Park, Australia

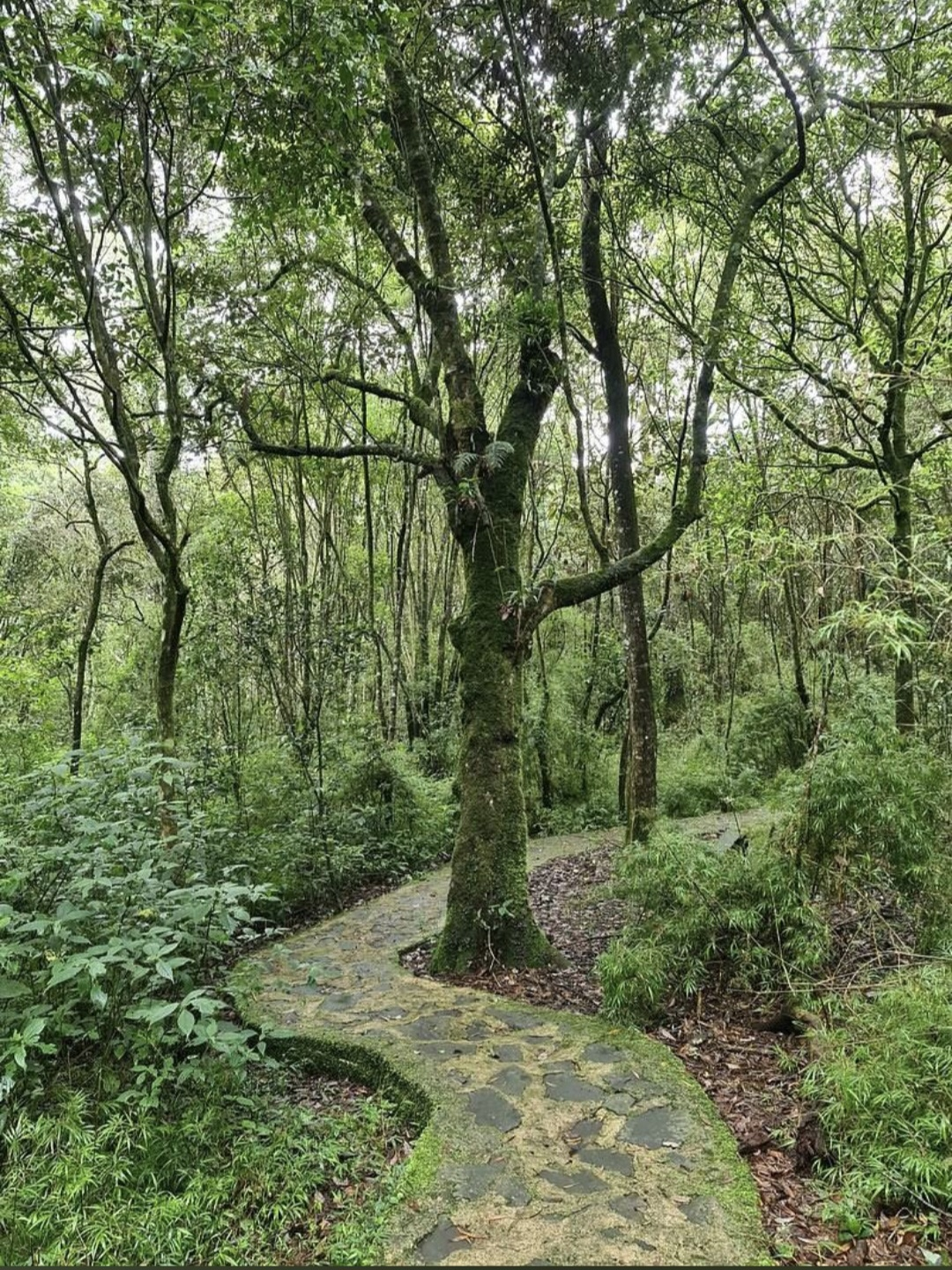
Heavily dense and mossy tropical cloud forest vegetation in Galway's Land National Park, Sri Lanka

Tree ferns in Peak Wilderness Sanctuary, Sri Lanka

Compared with lower-altitude tropical moist forests, cloud forests are characterised by reduced tree stature combined with increased stem density and, generally, lower woody plant diversity. Trees tend to be shorter and more heavily stemmed than their lowland counterparts, with gnarled trunks, dense compact crowns, and leaves that become progressively smaller, thicker, and harder with increasing altitude.

The persistently high moisture promotes exceptional development of epiphytes, plants that grow on other plants without making them parasites, particularly bryophytes (mosses and liverworts), lichens, ferns (including filmy ferns), bromeliads, and orchids. Epiphyte biomass can be very high; in some cloud forests, the weight of mosses and other epiphytes on a single tree exceeds the weight of the tree's own foliage. The number of endemic plant species can also be very high.

Cloud forests are frequently peatlands. The combination of high soil moisture, reduced solar radiation, and low rates of decomposition and mineralisation creates strongly acidic soils, with humus and peat often forming the upper soil layer.

Stadtmüller (1987) distinguishes two general types of tropical montane cloud forests:

Areas with high annual precipitation due to frequent cloud cover combined with heavy and sometimes persistent orographic rainfall. These forests have perceptible canopy strata, a high number of epiphytes, and a thick peat layer with high water-storage capacity.

Drier areas with mainly seasonal rainfall, where cloud stripping, the interception and deposition of cloud moisture by vegetation, accounts for a large proportion of the total moisture available to plants.

Regional and local terminology for cloud forests varies considerably. Some countries prefer terms such as Afromontane forest, upper montane rain forest, montane laurel forest, or locally specific names such as the Bolivian yungas and the laurisilva of the Atlantic Islands. In cooler parts of the tropics where similar meteorological conditions prevail, subtropical and temperate forests are sometimes also classified as cloud forests, though this usage is not universally accepted.

== Distribution of tropical montane cloud forests ==
Distribution of tropical montane cloud forests in 2016.

Cloud forests are globally rare: they account for only approximately 1% of the world's woodland area. A total of around 736 cloud forest sites have been identified in 59 countries by the World Conservation Monitoring Centre, of which 327 were legally protected areas as of 2002. Important areas occur in Central and South America (principally Costa Rica, Venezuela, Honduras, El Salvador, Guatemala, Mexico, Ecuador, and Colombia), East and Central Africa, India, Sri Lanka, Thailand, Vietnam, Indonesia, Malaysia, the Philippines, Hawaii, Papua New Guinea, and the Caribbean.

A 1997 World Conservation Monitoring Centre database recorded 605 tropical montane cloud forest sites in 41 countries. Of these, 280 sites (46%) were in Latin America, with the largest concentrations in Venezuela (64 sites), Mexico (64), Ecuador (35), and Colombia (28). Southeast Asia and Australasia accounted for 228 sites across 14 countries, with major concentrations in Indonesia (66), Malaysia (54), Sri Lanka (33), the Philippines (32), and Papua New Guinea (28). Africa had 97 sites scattered across 21 countries. Of all 605 sites, 264 were in protected areas.

== Temperate cloud forests ==
Although not universally accepted as true cloud forests, several forests in temperate regions share strong structural and climatic similarities with their tropical counterparts. The classification is further complicated by the occasional use of "temperate" to describe cool-climate cloud forests within tropical countries.

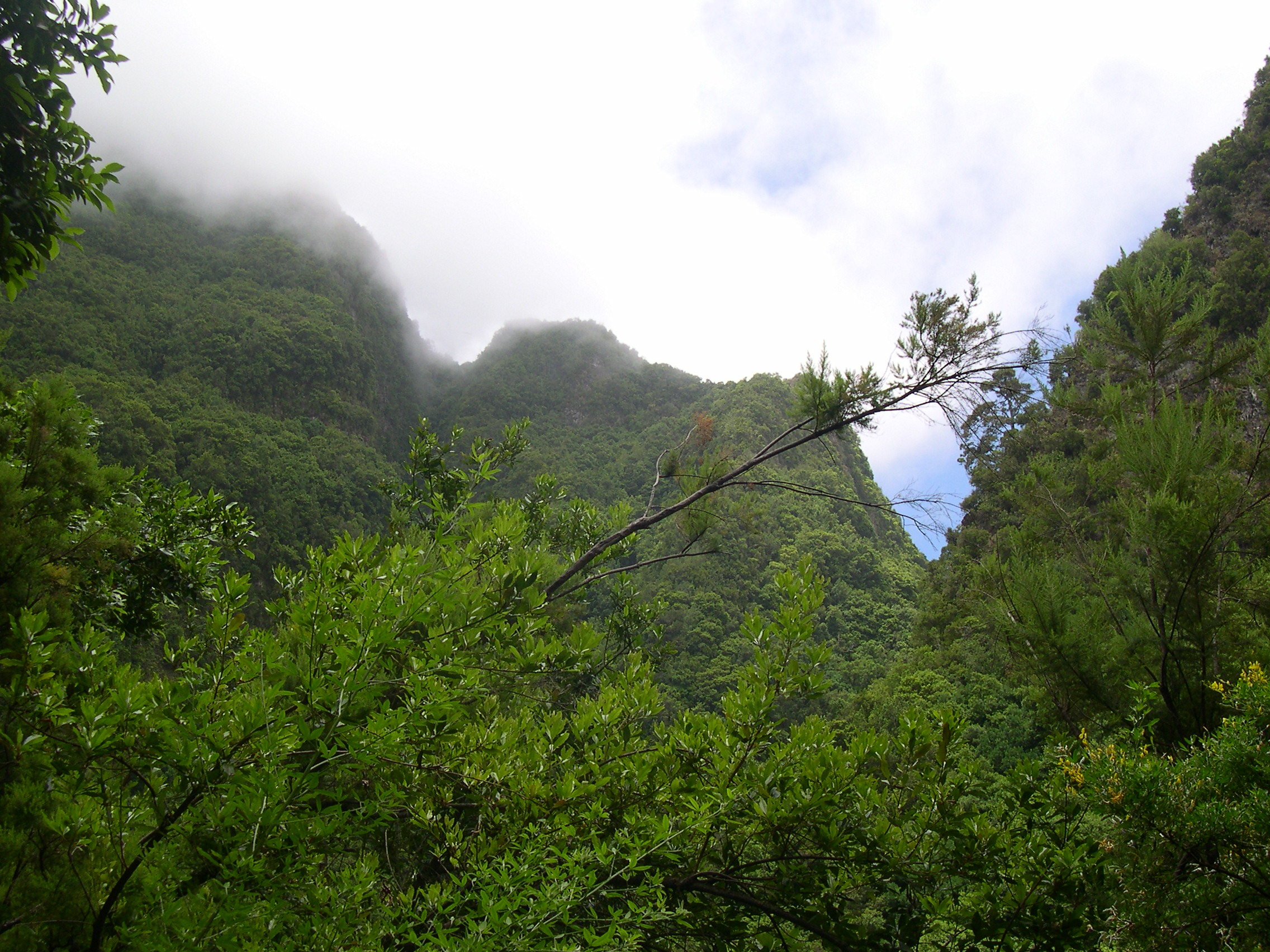
Temperate cloud forest on La Palma, Canary Islands

=== Distribution by country ===
- Argentina – Salta, Jujuy, Catamarca and Tucumán (Southern Andean Yungas)
- Australia – Lamington National Park, Springbrook National Park, Mount Bartle Frere and Mount Bellenden Ker (Queensland) and Mount Gower (Lord Howe Island)
- Brazil – Serra do Mar coastal forests
- Chile – Bosque de Fray Jorge National Park
- China – Yunnan Plateau, mountains of southern and eastern China
- Costa Rica – Monteverde Cloud Forest Reserve. Approximately 10,500 hectares, containing around 2,500 plant species (including the greatest concentration of orchid species of any single site on Earth), 100 species of mammals, 400 species of birds, 120 species of reptiles, and thousands of insect species.
- Ethiopia – Harenna Forest, Bale Mountains National Park and Kafa Biosphere Reserve
- Fiji Islands – Tropical montane cloud forests of Taveuni and Gau Island
- Iran – Eastern Alborz mountains, Golestan Province
- Japan – Parts of Yakushima Island
- Portugal – Azores and Madeira (referring primarily to the wetter, higher-altitude laurisilva)
- Samoa – Savai'i Island
- Sri Lanka – Upper slopes of the Knuckles Mountain Range, Matale
- Taiwan – Yuanyang Lake Nature Reserve, Chatianshan Nature Reserve, and Fuxing District, Taoyuan

== Conservation status ==
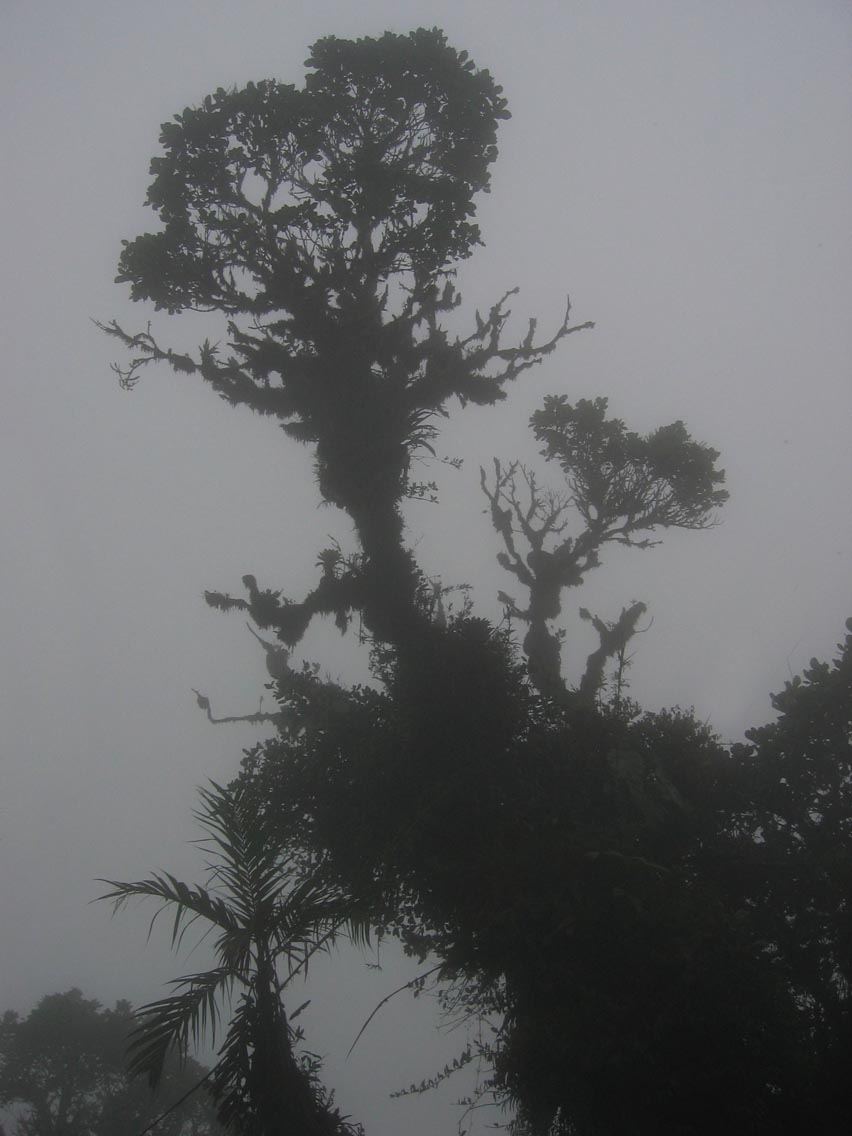
At the edge of the Panamanian side of the Parque Internacional la Amistad

Cloud forests occupied approximately 0.4% of the global land surface in 2001 and harbored around 3,700 species of birds, mammals, reptiles, amphibians, and tree ferns — approximately 15% of global diversity in those groups — with roughly half of those species entirely restricted to cloud forests.

Worldwide, approximately 2.4% of cloud forest cover was lost between 2001 and 2018. In some regions, losses exceeded 8%, and losses were most severe in readily accessible lowland cloud forest zones. Although protected areas have slowed the rate of decline, a significant proportion of loss continues to occur within formally protected areas.

In 1970, the original extent of cloud forests on Earth was estimated at around 50 million hectares. Population growth, poverty, and uncontrolled land use have contributed to substantial losses since then. The 1990 Global Forest Survey found that 1.1% of tropical mountain and highland forests were being lost annually — a higher rate than in any other tropical forest type. In Colombia, one of the countries with the greatest cloud forest area, only 10–20% of the original cover is estimated to remain.^{[7]} Significant areas have been converted to plantations, agriculture, and pasture; important crops in montane forest zones include tea and coffee, and selective logging of unique tree species alters forest structure even where outright clearance has not occurred.

In 2004, approximately one-third of all cloud forests on the planet were under some form of legal protection. Conservation efforts in some regions have achieved measurable successes: for example, the Monteverde Cloud Forest Reserve in Costa Rica has maintained and expanded its protected area since its establishment, and similar private and community-led reserves across the Andes have helped stabilize cover in targeted localities.

== Importance ==
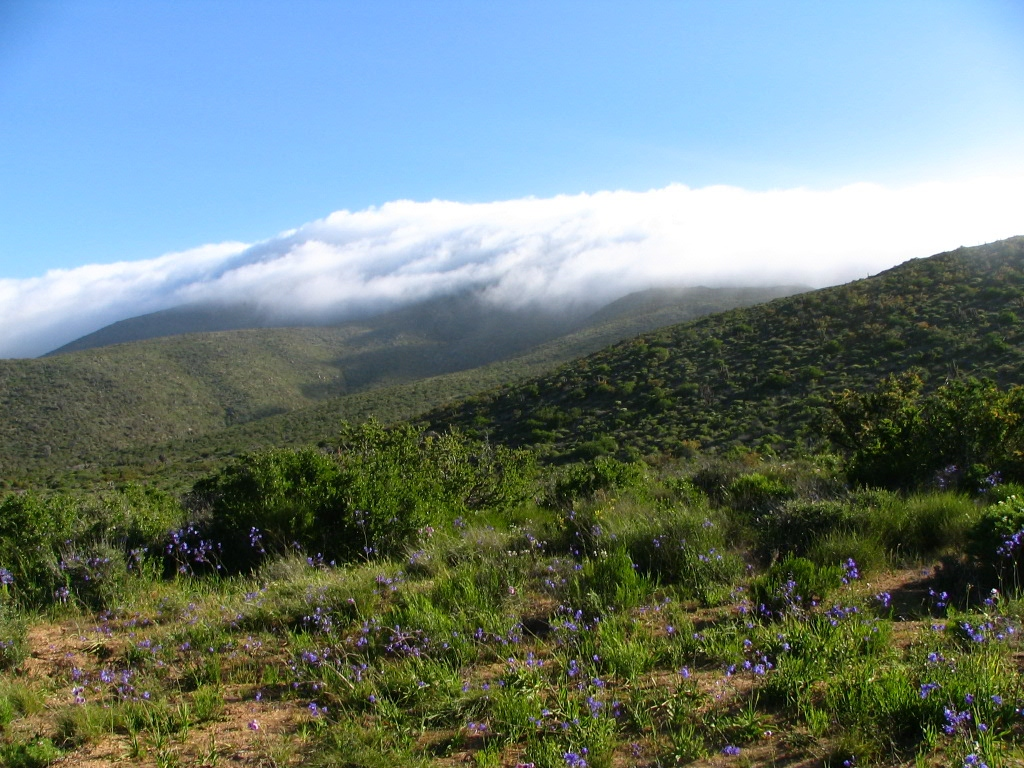
Seaborne moisture is vital to the cloud forest of Fray Jorge that is surrounded by the arid southern reaches of the Atacama Desert.

=== Watershed function ===
Cloud forests play a disproportionately important role in the regional hydrological cycle relative to their small global extent. The cloud-stripping mechanism — whereby tree canopies intercept wind-driven cloud moisture — can effectively double rainfall inputs during dry seasons and add approximately 10% to wet-season totals. Experiments by Costin and Wimbush (1961) demonstrated that the canopies of non-cloud forests intercept and evaporate 20% more precipitation than cloud forests do, meaning that cloud forests deliver a larger net water input to the land surface. This function makes cloud forests critical catchment areas for rivers and groundwater systems serving large human populations, particularly in seasonally dry regions such as coastal Peru and northern Chile where cloud forests are virtually the sole source of freshwater.

=== Vegetation ===
Tropical montane cloud forests are not as species-rich as tropical lowland forests in terms of overall woody plant diversity, but they provide habitat for many species found nowhere else on Earth; for example, Cerro de la Neblina, a permanently cloud-covered massif in southern Venezuela, supports numerous shrubs, orchids, and insectivorous plants entirely restricted to that single mountain. The extraordinary richness of epiphytic flora is a particular hallmark: cloud forests harbor a large proportion of the world's orchid, bromeliad, and filmy fern diversity, and bryophyte biomass per unit area frequently exceeds that of any other forest type.

=== Fauna ===
Faunal endemism in cloud forests is exceptionally high. In Peru alone, more than one-third of the country's 270 endemic birds, mammals, and frogs are found in cloud forests. Globally, cloud forests are particularly important for birds: highly specialized species such as the resplendent quetzal (Pharomachrus mocinno) of Central America, numerous hummingbird species, and many tanagers and antpittas are closely tied to cloud forest habitats and are among the region's flagship conservation species.

Among mammals, the spectacled bear (Tremarctos ornatus), the only bear native to South America, is one of the best-known cloud forest species and serves as an important seed disperser across Andean cloud forests. Amphibian diversity is also notable: the cool, moist microclimate supports many frog and salamander species that are highly sensitive to desiccation and temperature change, making them among the most vulnerable groups to projected climate warming.

== Impact of climate change ==
Because cloud forests are defined by a delicate dependency on specific atmospheric conditions at specific elevations, they are among the ecosystems most sensitive to global climate change. As temperatures rise, the elevation at which cloud condensation occurs shifts upward, pushing the cloud base — and therefore the zone suitable for cloud forest — to higher altitudes and reducing the total land area available.

Projections for Mexico suggest that the geographic extent of environmentally suitable habitat for cloud forests will decline sharply over the next 70 years under most climate scenarios. A number of climate models indicate that low-altitude cloudiness will be reduced, meaning that some existing cloud forests will experience a drying trend even before temperature-driven habitat loss becomes acute.

As cloud moisture immersion decreases and temperatures rise, the hydrological cycle within these forests will change, and the system will progressively dry out. This will cause wilting and dieback of epiphytes, which depend on near-constant high humidity for water and nutrient uptake.^{[29]} Frogs, lizards, and other ectotherms are expected to suffer increasing physiological stress from drought and temperature extremes. Modelling of Mexican cloud forests suggests that these changes could drive the extinction of up to 37 vertebrate species endemic to that region.

Human-induced climate change is also projected to increase the frequency of rapid hurricane intensification, which will periodically cause severe structural damage to tropical montane cloud forests in vulnerable coastal cordilleras. Taken together, the consequences of climate change for cloud forests include biodiversity loss, disrupted biogeochemistry, altitude shifts in species ranges, wholesale community reshuffling, and, in some areas, complete disappearance of the ecosystem.
