= Cumulus mediocris cloud =

Form of cumulus cloud

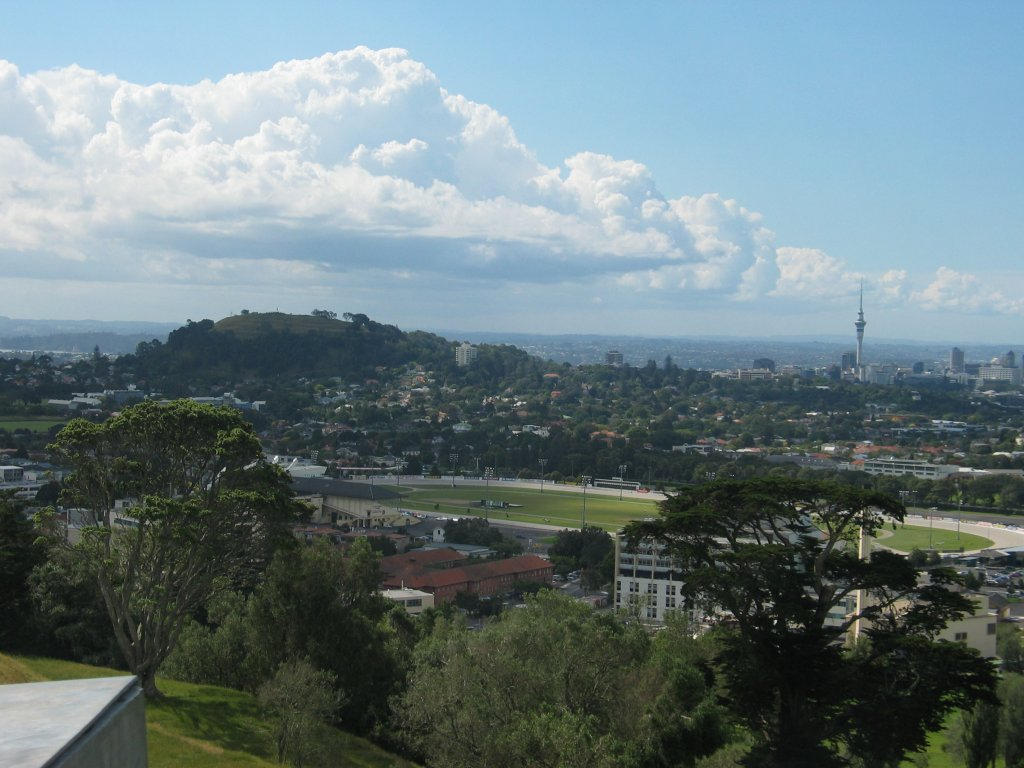
- Cumulus mediocris clouds over Auckland, with a light precipitation shaft visible in the distance under cumulus congestus clouds.
- Abbreviation: Cu med
- Genus: Cumulus (heaped)
- Species: Mediocris (moderate)
- Variety: Radiatuse
- Altitude: 500–3000 m (1,500–10,000 ft)
- Classification: Family C (Low-level)
- Appearance: Low-altitude, medium height, tall as it is wide, fluffy heaps of clouds with cotton-like appearance.
- Precipitation: Uncommon rain, snow or snow pellets, but it can develop into a cumulus congestus which has a greater chance of precipitation

Cumulus mediocris is a low to middle-level cloud with some vertical extent (Family D1) of the genus cumulus, taller than cumulus humilis. It also may exhibit small protuberances from the top and may show the cauliflower form characteristic of cumulus clouds.

Cumulus mediocris clouds do not generally produce precipitation of more than very light intensity, but can further develop into clouds such as cumulus congestus or cumulonimbus, which do produce precipitation and severe storms.

Cumulus mediocris is also classified as a low cloud and is coded C_{L}2 by the World Meteorological Organization.

== Description ==
Illustration of the formation of a cumulus cloud.

Cumulus mediocris is brilliantly white when sunlit, and is dark underneath. A single pattern-based variety, Cumulus radiatus, is sometimes seen when the individual clouds are arranged into parallel rows. The resulting formations are known as "cloud streets" and are aligned approximately parallel to the wind.

Cumulus mediocris may have precipitation-based features like virga, and may form Cumulus praecipitato clouds. The pannus supplementary feature is sometimes seen with precipitating Cumulus mediocris, but in this case the C_{L}7 reporting code normally used with to identify pannus is usually superseded by C_{L}2 due to the additional presence of significant vertical development. Pileus (cap cloud), velum (apron), arcus (roll or shelf cloud) and tuba (vertical column) features are also occasionally seen with Cumulus mediocris. Cumulus mediocris may form as a result of a partial transformation of altocumulus or stratocumulus. This genus and species type may also be the result of a complete transformation of stratocumulus or stratus.

== Forecasting ==
These clouds are common in the advance of a cold front or in unstable atmospheric conditions such as an area of low pressure. They can grow into larger cumulus congestus which could bring rain and winds, and even develop into a cumulonimbus cloud. The presence of cumulus mediocris in the morning or early afternoon indicates significant instability in the atmosphere which will likely lead to thunderstorms later in the afternoon or evening.

== Formation ==
Like any Cumulus cloud, Cumulus mediocris forms via convection from thermal air columns. Pockets of air warmer than the air around them (due to ground surface irregularities or other factors) are also less dense than the air around them, and are buoyant. As the air pockets float upwards, they cool, eventually reaching their dew point and condensing, forming Cumulus humilis clouds. If the thermals are powerful enough, they will continue to push air upwards and the Cumulus humilis clouds will develop into Cumulus mediocris clouds.

== See also ==
- Atmospheric convection
- Cumulus humilis
- Cumulus congestus
- Cumulonimbus
- Thermal
- Lapse rate
