= Fractus cloud =

Cloud species

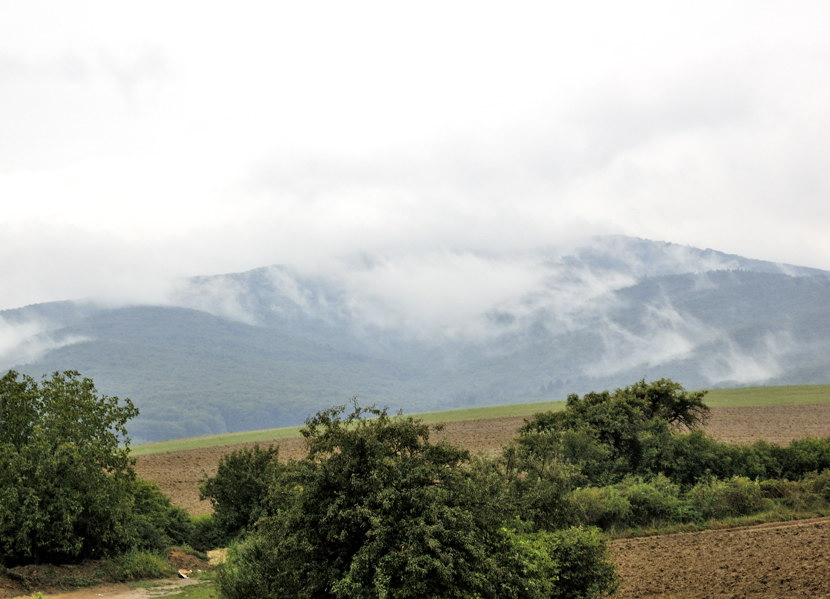
- Stratus fractus silvagenitus clouds over the Považský Inovec mountains
- Abbreviation: Cu fr., St fr., Frnb
- Genus: Cumulus or stratus
- Species: Fractus (broken)
- Altitude: Below 1,500 m (5,000 ft)
- Classification: Family C (Low-level)
- Appearance: irregular, ragged
- Precipitation: No

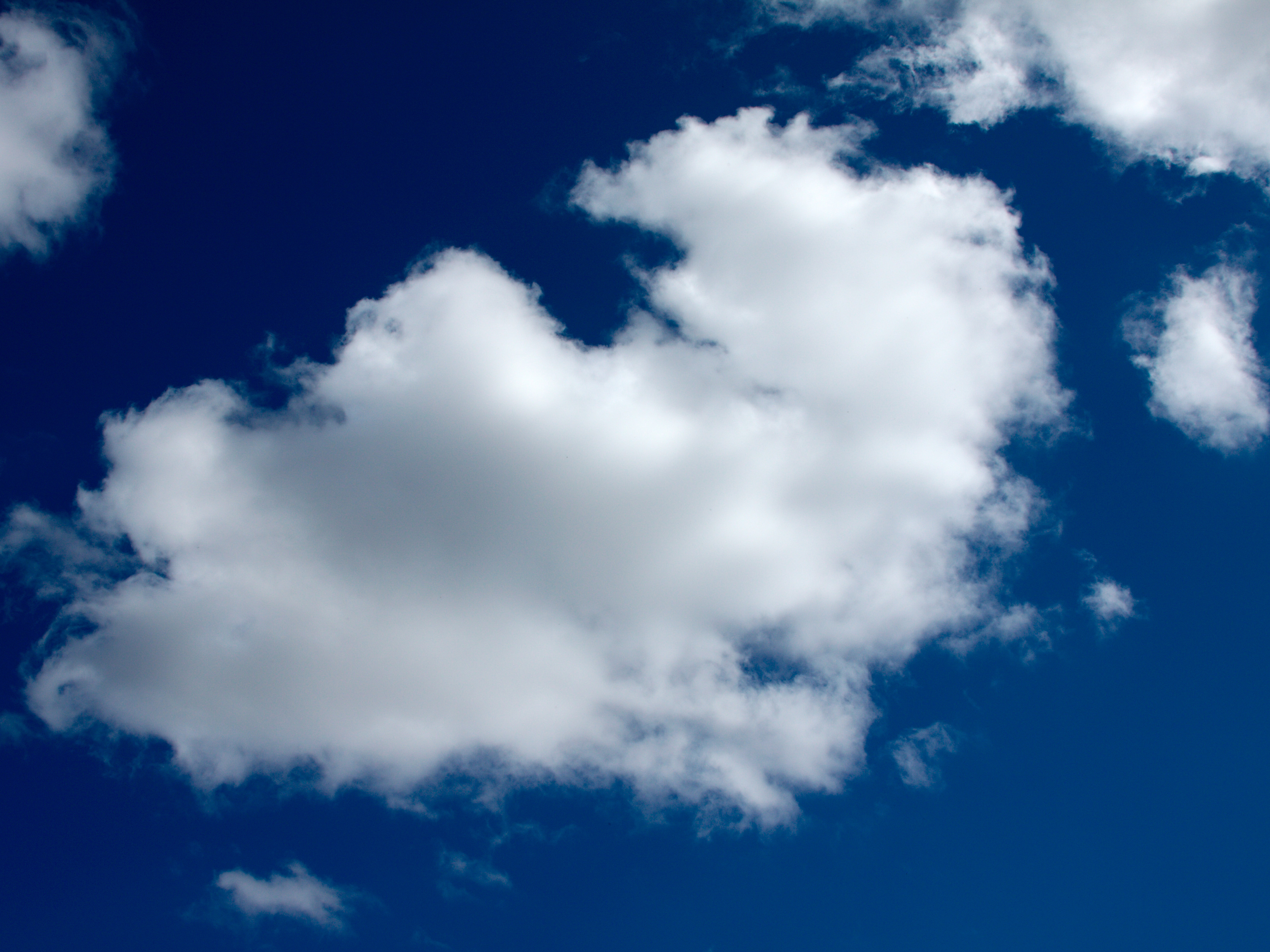
Cumulus fractus

Fractus clouds, also called fractostratus or fractocumulus, are small, ragged cloud fragments that are usually found under an ambient cloud base. They form or have broken off from a larger cloud, and are generally sheared by strong winds, giving them a jagged, shredded appearance. Fractus have irregular patterns, appearing much like torn pieces of cotton candy. They change constantly, often forming and dissipating rapidly. They do not have clearly defined bases. Sometimes they are persistent and form very near the surface. Common kinds include scud and cloud tags.

== Forms ==
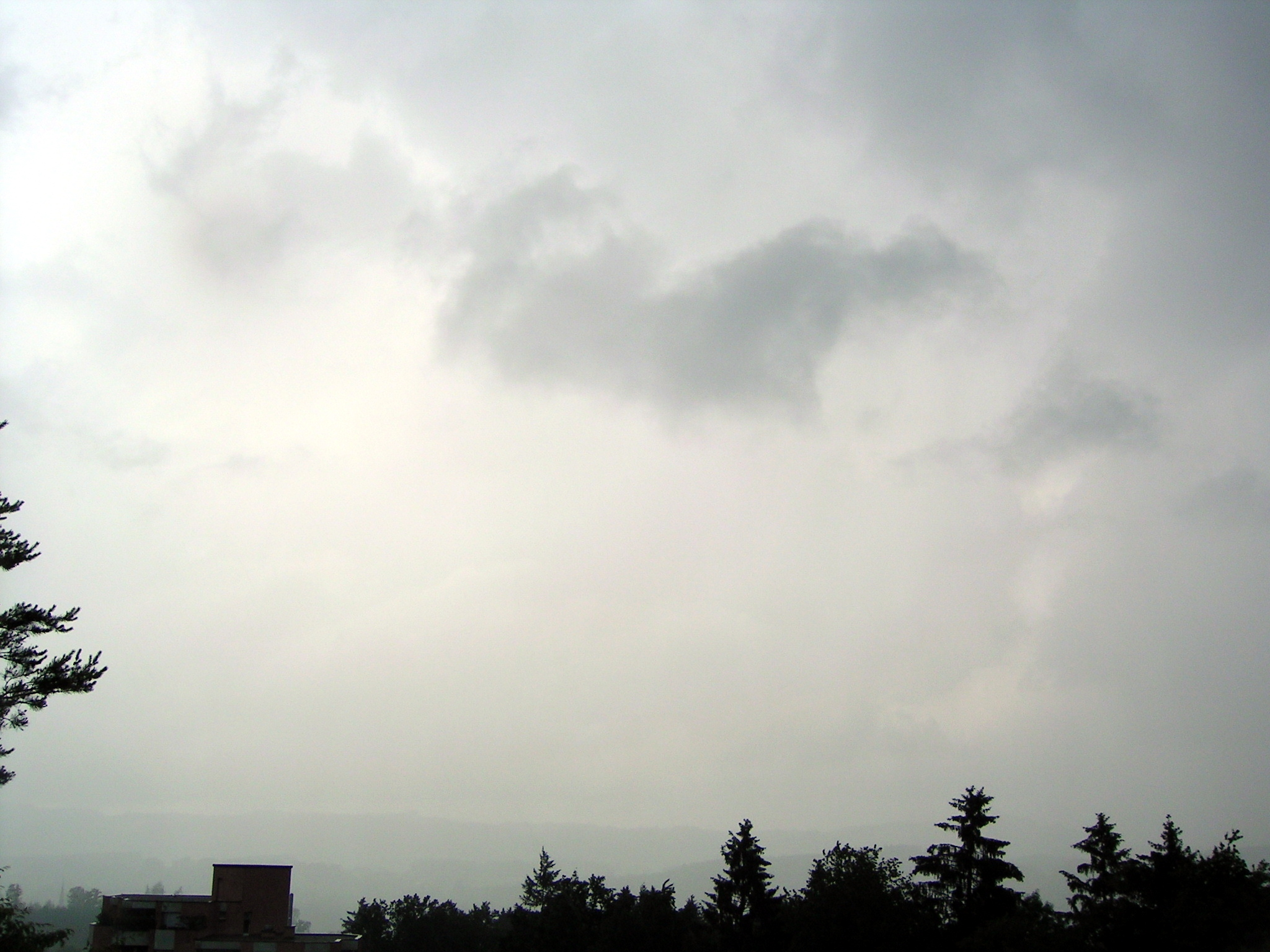
A nimbostratus cloud in the background with a stratus fractus in the middle of the upper half of the image.

Fractus are accessory clouds, named for the type of cloud from which they were sheared. The two principal forms are cumulus fractus (formerly, fractocumulus) and stratus fractus (formerly, fractostratus). Fractus clouds may develop into cumulus if the ground heats enough to start convection. Stratus fractus is distinguishable from cumulus fractus by its smaller vertical extent, darker color, and the greater dispersion of its particles.

Cumulus fractus clouds actually look like ragged cumulus clouds. They may originate from dissipated cumulus clouds, appearing in this case as white ragged clouds located at significant distances from each other. Cumulus fractus in particular form on the leading and trailing edges of summer storms in warm and humid conditions. Observing fractus gives an indication of wind movements under the parent cloud.

Masses of multiple fractus clouds, located under a main cloud, are called pannus or scud clouds.

Fractonimbus is a form of stratus fractus, developing under precipitation clouds due to turbulent air movement. They are dark-gray and ragged in appearance. Fractonimbus exist only under precipitation clouds (such as nimbostratus, altostratus or cumulonimbus), and don't produce precipitation themselves. Fractonimbus may eventually merge completely with overlying nimbostratus clouds.

Stratus silvagenitus clouds also commonly form as scattered stratus fractus silvagenitus. These clouds can be seen as the occasional ragged tuft of cloud seeming to rise from forests, commonly just after rain or during other periods of high humidity.

== Significance in thunderstorms ==
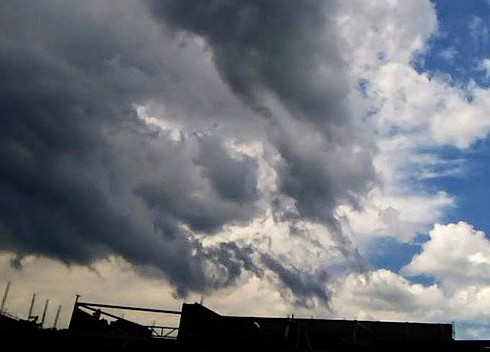
Scud clouds under a thunderstorm

In rainstorms, scud often forms in the updraft area where the air has been cooled by precipitation from the downdraft, thus condensation occurs below the ambient cloud deck. If the scud is rising and moving towards the main updraft, sometimes marked by a rain-free base (RFB) or wall cloud, then the thunderstorm is still developing from the rising scud.

In addition to forming in inflow, fractus also forms in the outflow. Scud are very common on the leading edge of a thunderstorm where warm, moist air is lifted by the gust front. Scud are usually found under shelf clouds.

== See also ==
- List of cloud types
