= Cumulus humilis cloud =

Cloud species

Cumulus humilis clouds
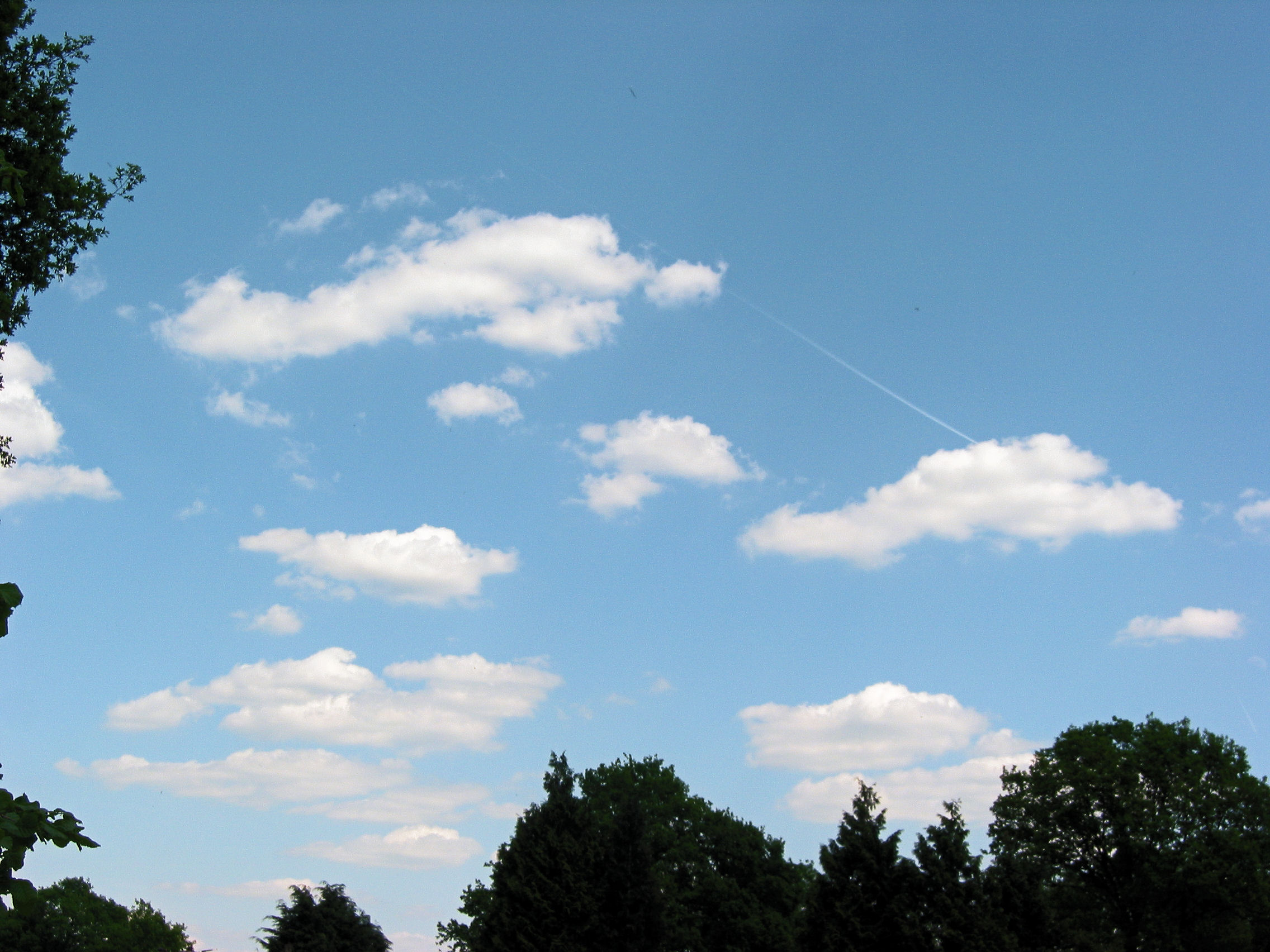
- Abbreviation: Cu hum
- Genus: Cumulus (heap)
- Species: humilis (humble)
- Variety: Radiatuse
- Altitude: 200-2000 m (656–7,000 ft)
- Classification: Family C (Low-level)
- Appearance: Low-altitude, flattened, wider than it is tall, fluffy heaps of clouds with cotton-like appearance.
- Precipitation: Uncommon Rain, Snow or Snow pellets

Cumulus humilis are cumuliform clouds with little vertical extent, common in the summer, that are often referred to as "fair weather cumulus". If they develop into cumulus mediocris or cumulus congestus, thunderstorms could form later in the day.

They generally form at lower altitudes (500–3000 m (1,500–10,000 ft)), but in hot countries or over mountainous terrain these clouds can occur at an altitude of up to 6,000 m (20,000 ft). They show no significant vertical development, indicating that the temperature in the atmosphere above them either drops off very slowly or not at all with altitude; that is, the environmental lapse rate is small or negative. Cumulus humilis clouds often have little variance in their depths due to their constrained vertical development. Cumulus humilis may be accompanied by other cloud types.

Air below the cloud base can be quite turbulent due to the thermals that formed the clouds, giving occupants of light aircraft an uncomfortable ride. To avoid turbulence where such clouds are present, pilots may climb above the cloud tops. However, glider pilots actively seek out the rising air to gain altitude.

These clouds may later metamorphose into cumulus mediocris and eventually cumulus congestus clouds when convection is intense enough, though the presence of these types of clouds usually indicates fair weather.

== Forecasting ==
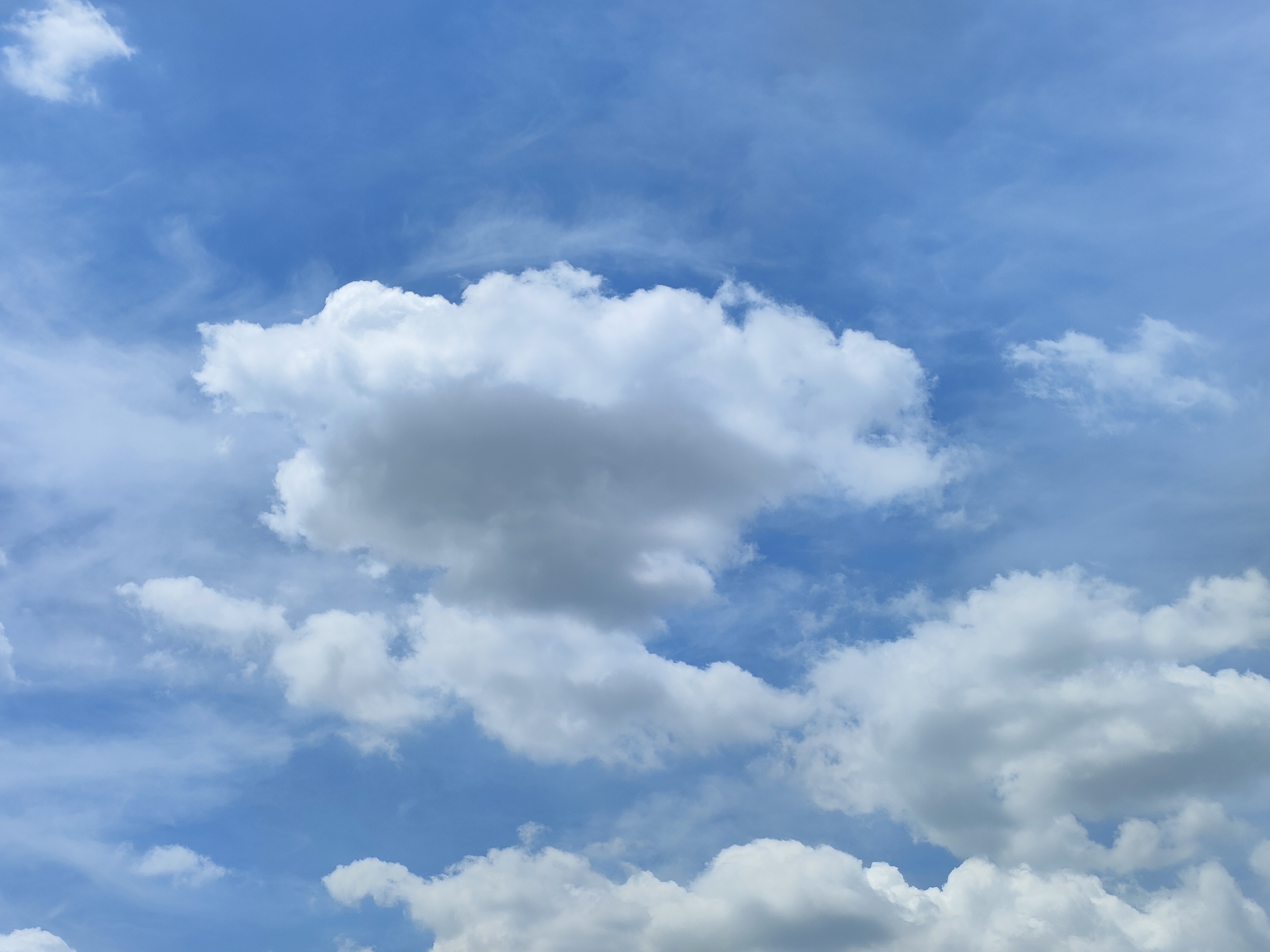
Cumulus humilis clouds below cirrus clouds.

Morning cumulus humilis clouds are signs of an unstable atmosphere. Larger clouds or possibly thunderstorms could form throughout the day to cause bad or severe weather in the afternoon or evening. Cumulus humilis clouds are not rain clouds but could precede a storm.

Cumulus humilis are sometimes seen beneath cirrostratus clouds, which block some of the heat from the sun and thus create an inversion, causing any cumuliform clouds to flatten and become cumulus humilis. In this case, a warm front could be approaching and rain is possible for the next 12 to 24 hours.

When cumulus humilis appear in a clear sky, they are an indicator of pleasant weather for the next several hours.

== Formation ==
Cumulus humilis clouds are formed by rising warm air or thermals with ascending air currents of 2–5 m/s (7–17 ft/s). These clouds are usually very small convective clouds and usually form after a thermal reaches the condensation level. They can develop into cumulus mediocris clouds but most often dissipate a few minutes after formation.

== See also ==
- Cumulus mediocris
- Atmospheric convection
