= Cirrus duplicatus =

Form of cirrus cloud

- Abbreviation: Ci du
- Genus: Cirrus (curl)
- Variety: duplicatus (double)
- Altitude: Above 5,000 m (Above 16,500 ft)
- Appearance: two or more overlapping layers
- Precipitation: No

Cirrus duplicatus is a variety of cirrus cloud. The name cirrus duplicatus is derived from Latin, meaning "double". The duplicatus variety of cirrus clouds occurs when there are at least two layers of cirrus clouds. Most of the time, occurrences of cirrus fibratus and cirrus uncinus are in the duplicatus form. Like stratus clouds, cirrus clouds are often seen in the duplicatus form.

== See also ==
- List of cloud types
