= Cirrus radiatus =

Type of cloud

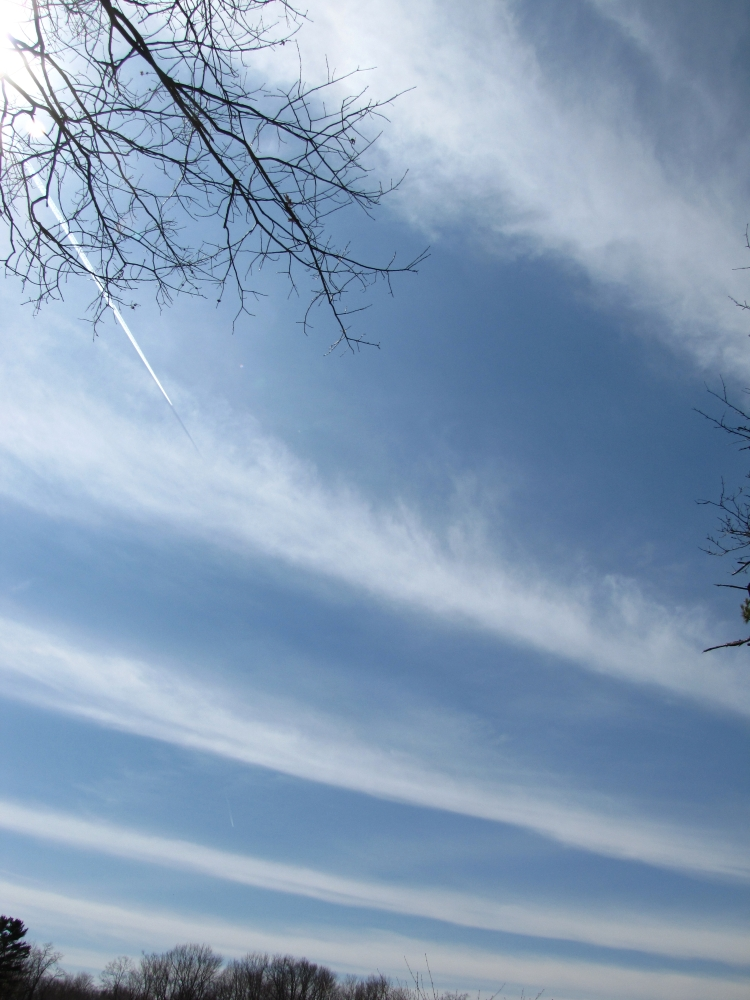
- Cirrus radiatus clouds with a contrail crossing through
- Abbreviation: Ci ra
- Genus: Cirrus (curl)
- Variety: radiatus (striped)
- Altitude: Above 5,000 m (Above 16,500 ft)
- Appearance: parallel bands
- Precipitation: No

Cirrus radiatus is a variety of cirrus cloud. The name cirrus radiatus is derived from Latin, meaning "rayed, striped". This variety of cirrus clouds occurs in parallel bands that often cover the entire sky and appear to converge at a single point or two opposite points on the horizon. Cirrus radiatus is often partly made up of cirrocumulus or cirrostratus.
