= Cirrus vertebratus =

Form of cirrus cloud

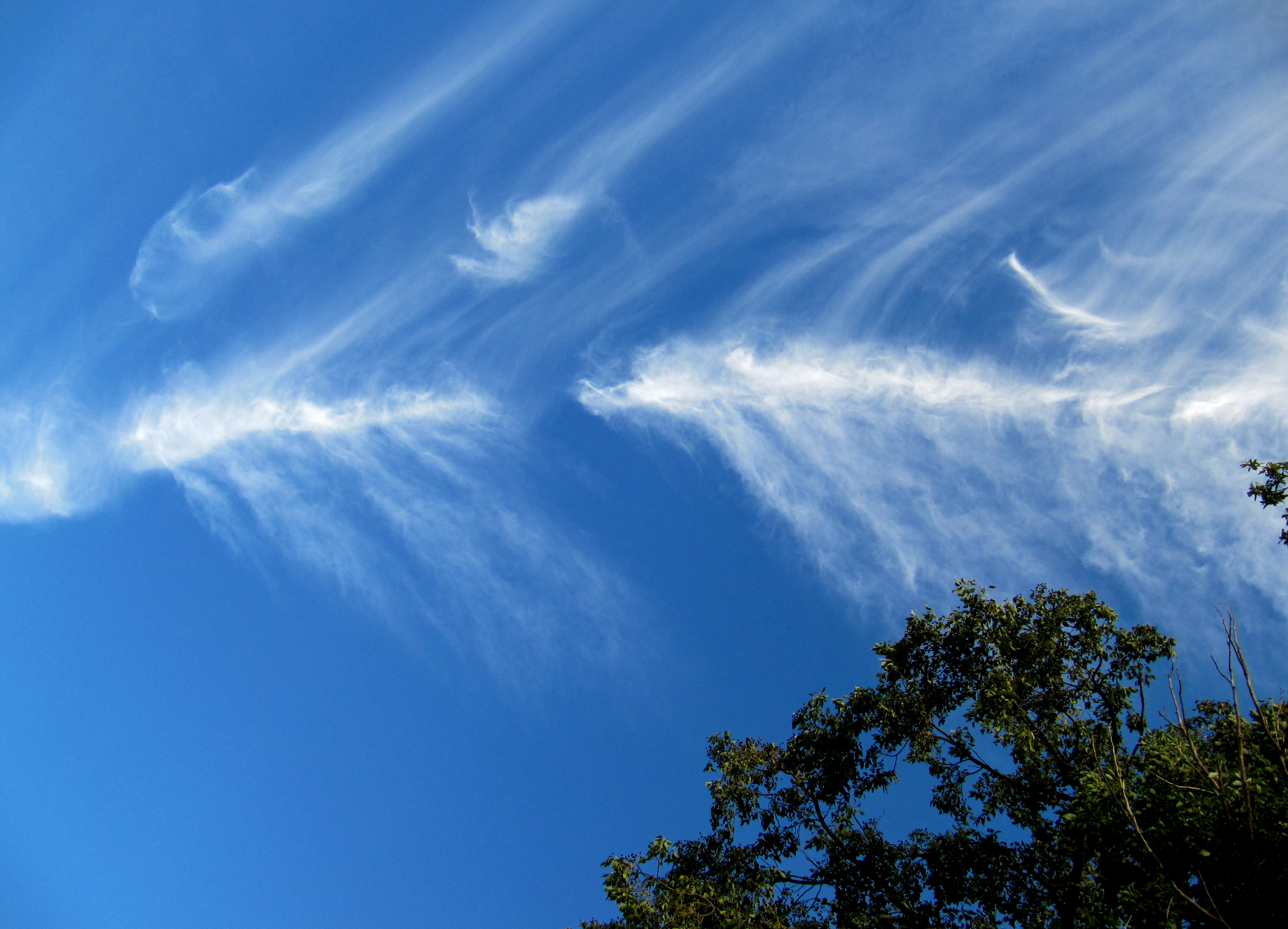
- Cirrus vertebratus cloud
- Abbreviation: Ci ve
- Genus: Cirrus (curl)
- Variety: vertebratus (jointed)
- Altitude: Above 6,000 m (Above 20,000 ft)
- Classification: Family A (High-level)
- Appearance: looks like a spinal column or a fish skeleton
- Precipitation: No

Cirrus vertebratus is a type of cirrus cloud. The name cirrus vertebratus is derived from Latin, meaning "jointed, articulated, vertebrated". Like cirrus intortus, the vertebratus variety is exclusive to the cirrus genus. Cirrus vertebratus gives the impression of vertebrae in a spinal column, ribs, or a fish skeleton.

The variety is an unusual form of cirrus clouds and is formed by air moving parallel to the main cloud line. The gaps in the cloud occur where air is descending, while the "ribs" of the cloud correspond with areas of uplift. Their occurrence appears to be connected with the location of the jet stream.

== See also ==
- List of cloud types
