= Cirrus spissatus cloud =

Type of cloud

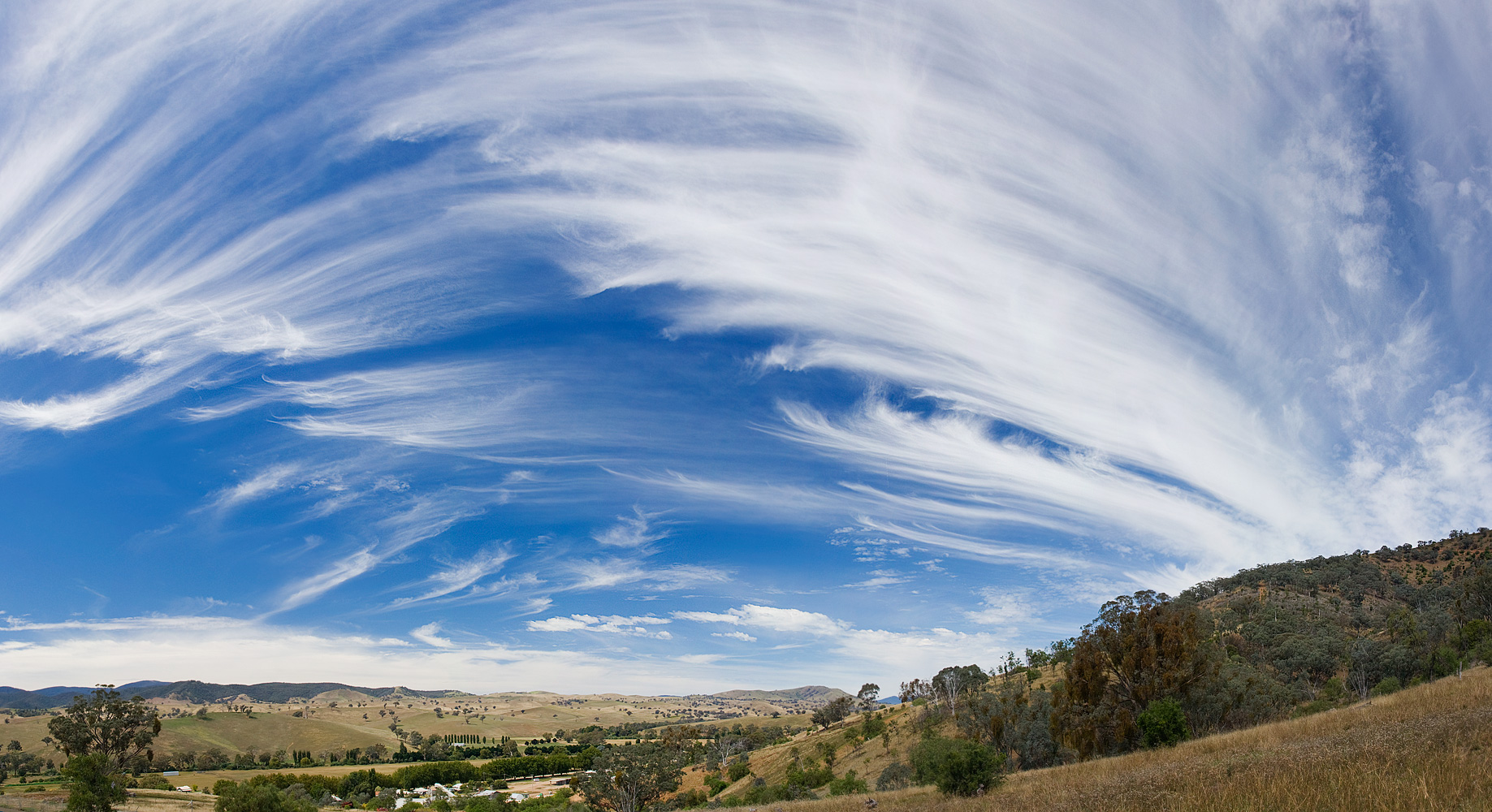
- Cirrus uncinus and spissatus merging into cirrostratus fibratus over Swifts Creek, Victoria
- Abbreviation: Ci spi
- Genus: Cirrus ("curl")
- Species: spissatus ("thick")
- Altitude: 6000–13,700 m (20,000–45,000 ft)
- Classification: Family A (High-level)
- Appearance: Fine threads or whips
- Precipitation: Virga only

Cirrus spissatus, also called cirrus densus or cirrus nothus, is the highest of the main cloud genera, and may sometimes even occur in the lower stratosphere. The characteristic features of cirrus clouds are fine threads or wisps of ice crystals, generally white, but appearing grey when dense and seen against the light. No precipitation from this cloud species reaches the ground. It also frequently exhibits optical phenomena.

Cirrus spissatus is the dense cirrus that will partly or completely obscure the Sun (or Moon), appearing dark grey when seen against the light. Although it arises under various circumstances, it is particularly commonly found in the plumes or anvils of cumulonimbus clouds.

A different variety of cirrus spissatus also forms from phenomena that have nothing to do with cumulonimbus blow-off or dissipating cumulonimbus cells. When dense cirrus is formed by means other than by cumulonimbus blow-off or dissipating cumulonimbus clouds, it will frequently be seen as many dense patches at different levels (cirrus spissatus duplicatus), often mixed with thin cirrus filaments. Another variety, cirrus spissatus intortus, is sometimes described as looking like "entangled sheaves" of cirrus clouds. When viewed toward the Sun, the denser patches often have gray bases.

== See also ==
- List of cloud types

== Sources ==
- http://www.clouds-online.com/cloud_atlas/cirrus/cirrus.htm
- https://web.archive.org/web/20110605020117/http://www.tpub.com/content/aerographer/14269/css/14269_34.htm
- http://en.wiktionary.org/wiki/spissus#Latin
