= Cirrostratus fibratus =

Form of cirrus cloud

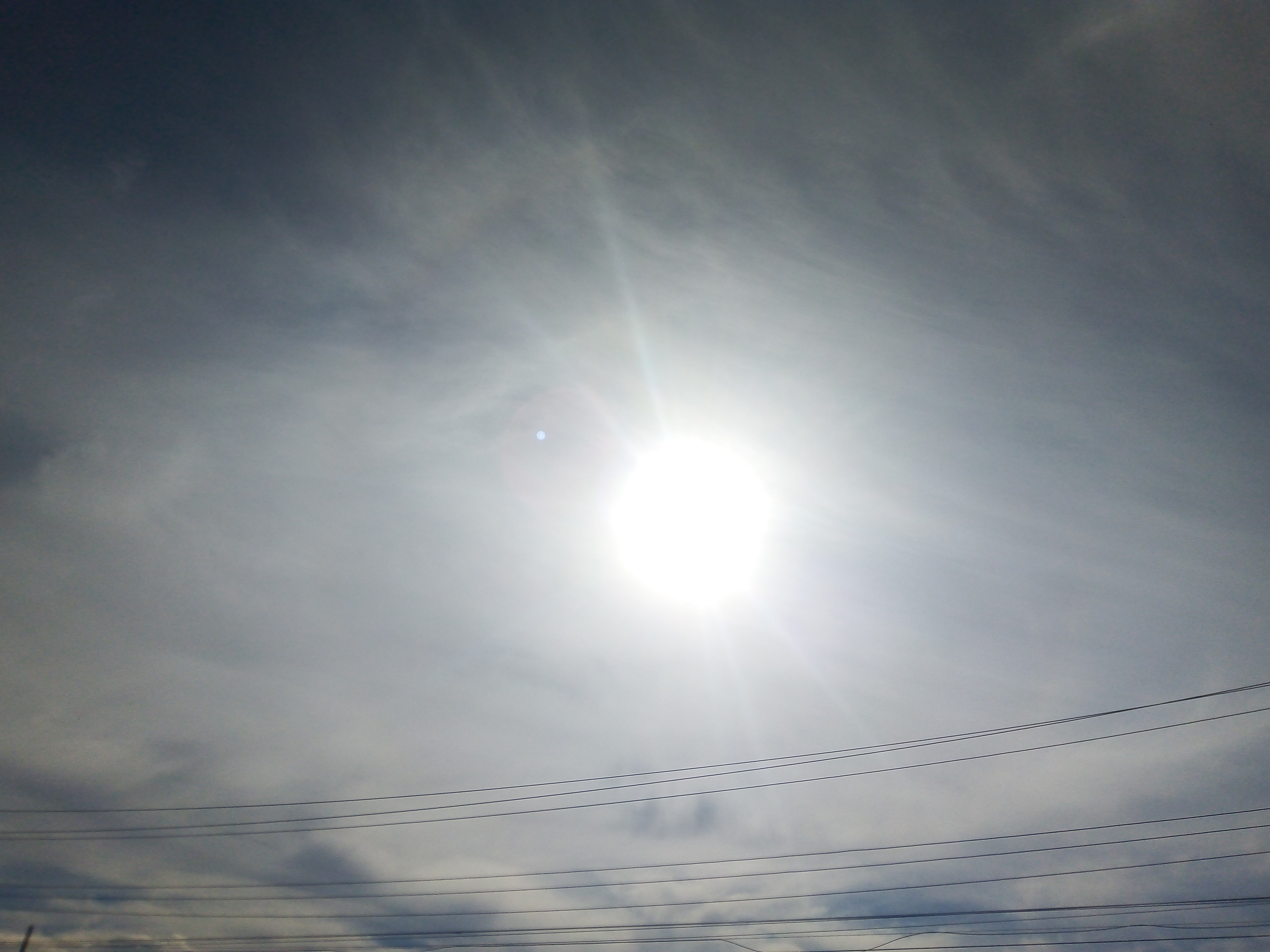
- Cirrostratus fibratus undulatus with faint sun halo
- Abbreviation: Cs fib
- Genus: Cirrus- (curl) -stratus (layered)
- Species: fibratus (fibered)
- Altitude: Above 6,000 m (Above 20,000 ft)
- Classification: Family A (High-level)
- Appearance: Fibrous veils
- Precipitation: No

Cirrostratus fibratus, also called cirrostratus filosus, is a type of cirrostratus cloud. The name cirrostratus fibratus is derived from Latin, meaning "fibrous". Cirrostratus fibratus is one of the two most common forms that cirrostratus often takes, with the other being cirrostratus nebulosus. They are formed from strong, continuous winds blowing at high altitudes, and they often cover a large portion of the sky. Cirrostratus fibratus may often develop from either cirrus fibratus or cirrus spissatus cloud. Precipitation is often imminent behind these clouds; however, they are not a precipitation-producing cloud.

== See also ==
- List of cloud types
