= Cirrostratus nebulosus =

Form of cirrostratus cloud

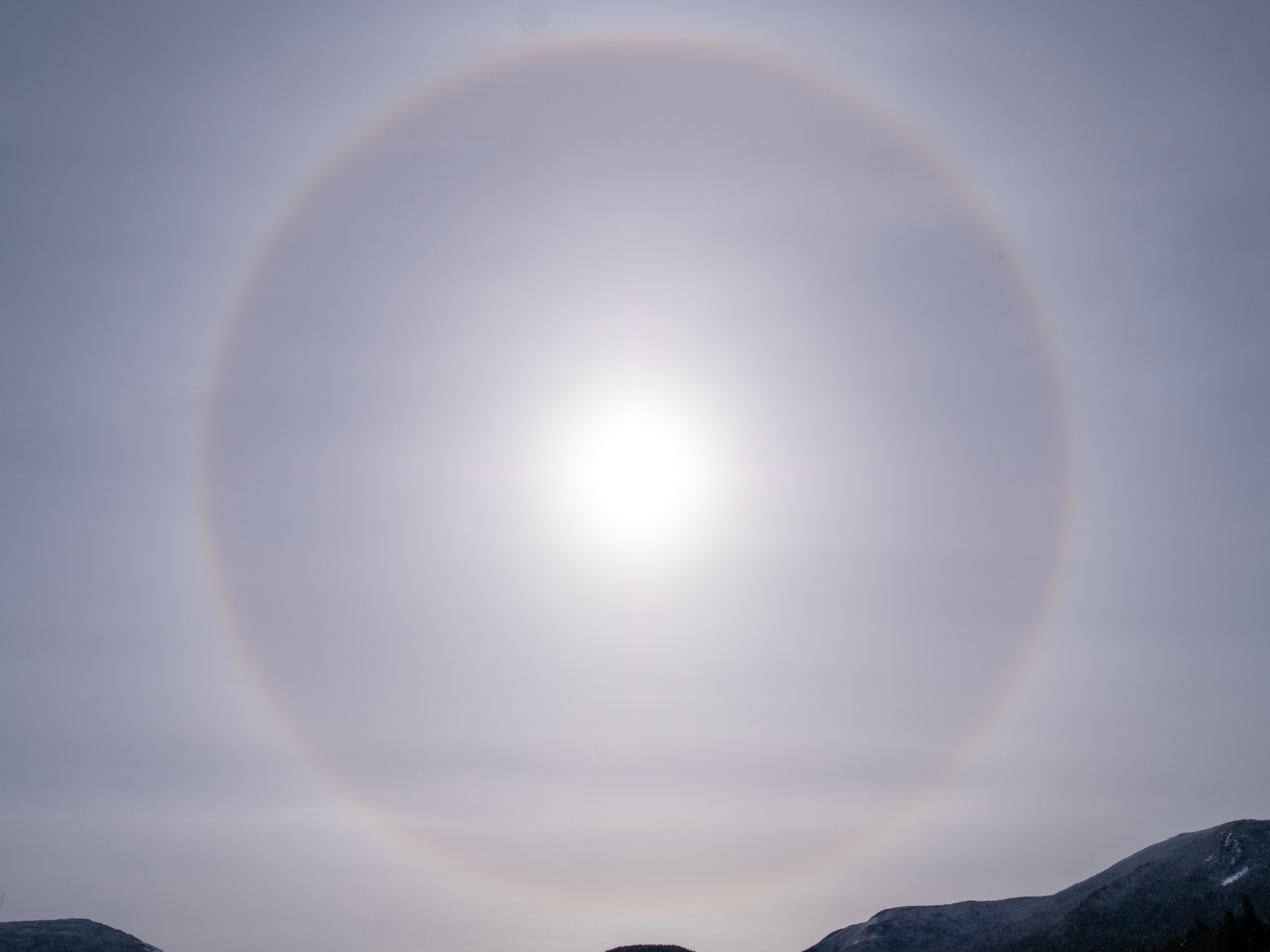
- Cirrostratus nebulosus clouds producing a 22° sun halo.
- Abbreviation: Cs neb
- Genus: Cirrus- (curl) -stratus (layered)
- Species: nebulosus (nebulous)
- Altitude: Above 6,000 m (Above 20,000 ft)
- Classification: Family A (High-level)
- Appearance: smooth, fog-like veil
- Precipitation: No, but may indicate an approaching rain-producing weather system

Cirrostratus nebulosus is a type of high-level cirrostratus cloud. The name cirrostratus nebulosus is derived from Latin, the adjective nebulosus meaning "full of vapor, foggy, cloudy, dark". Cirrostratus nebulosus is one of the two most common forms that cirrostratus often takes, with the other being cirrostratus fibratus. The nebulosus species is featureless and uniform, while the fibratus species has a fibrous appearance. Cirrostratus nebulosus are formed by gently rising air. The cloud is often hard to see unless the sun shines through it at the correct angle, forming a halo. While usually very light, the cloud may also be very dense, and the exact appearance of the cloud can vary from one formation to another. In the winter, precipitation often follows behind these clouds; however, they are not a precipitation-producing cloud.

== See also ==
- List of cloud types
