= Cirrus floccus =

Type of cloud

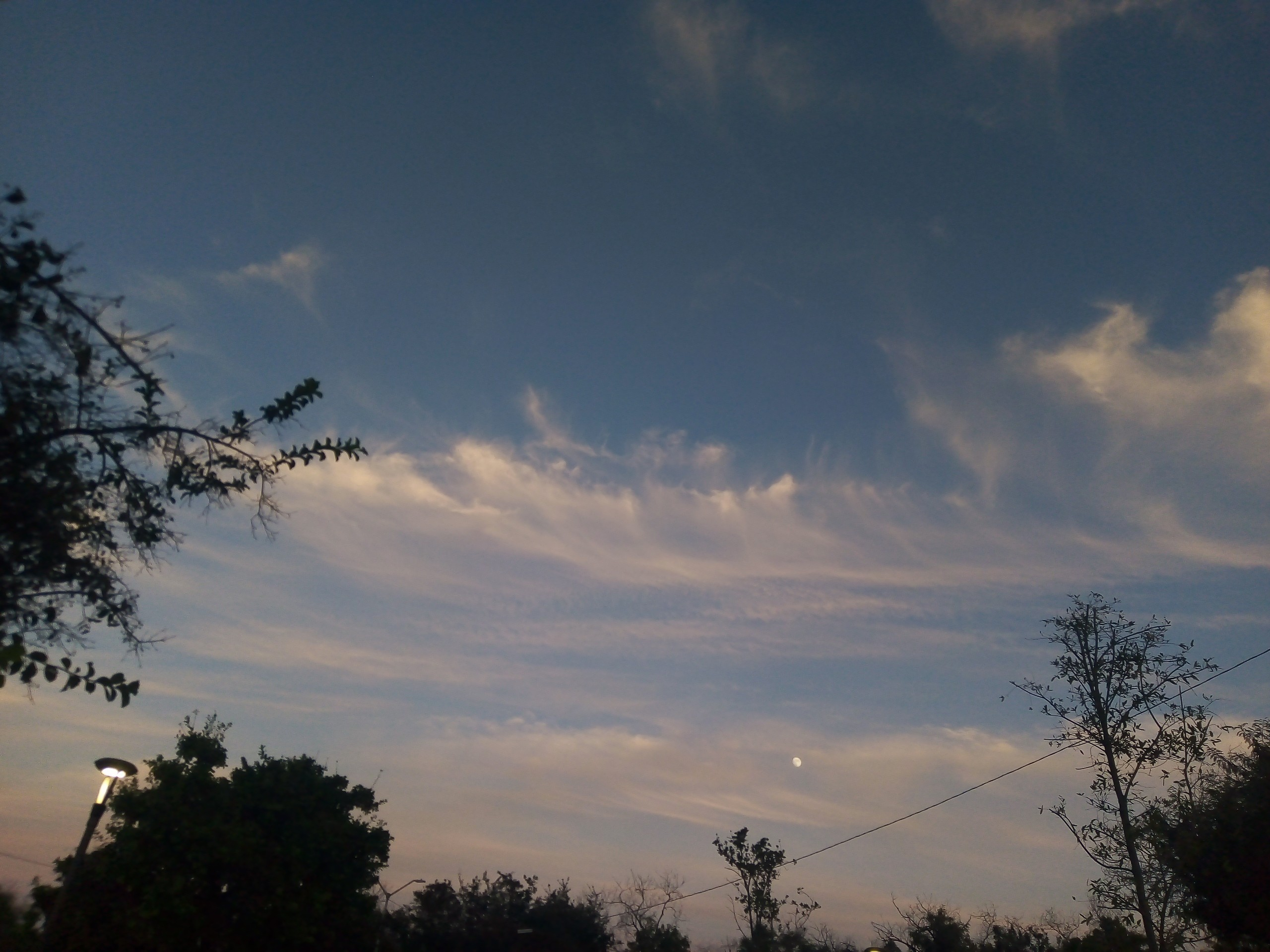
- Cirrus floccus clouds
- Abbreviation: Ci flo
- Genus: Cirrus (curl)
- Species: floccus (lock of wool)
- Altitude: Above 5,000 m (Above 16,500 ft)
- Classification: Family A (High-level)
- Appearance: small tufts
- Precipitation: None

Cirrus floccus is a type of cirrus cloud. The name cirrus floccus is derived from Latin, meaning "a lock of wool". Cirrus floccus occurs as small tufts of cloud, usually with a ragged base. The cloud can have virga falling from it, but the precipitation does not reach the ground. The individual tufts are usually isolated from each other. At formation, the cirrus floccus clouds are bright white and can be mistaken for altocumulus clouds; however, after a few minutes, the brightness begins to fade, indicating they are made up of pure ice, and are therefore at a higher level.

== See also ==
- List of cloud types
