= Cirrus cloud =

Genus of atmospheric cloud

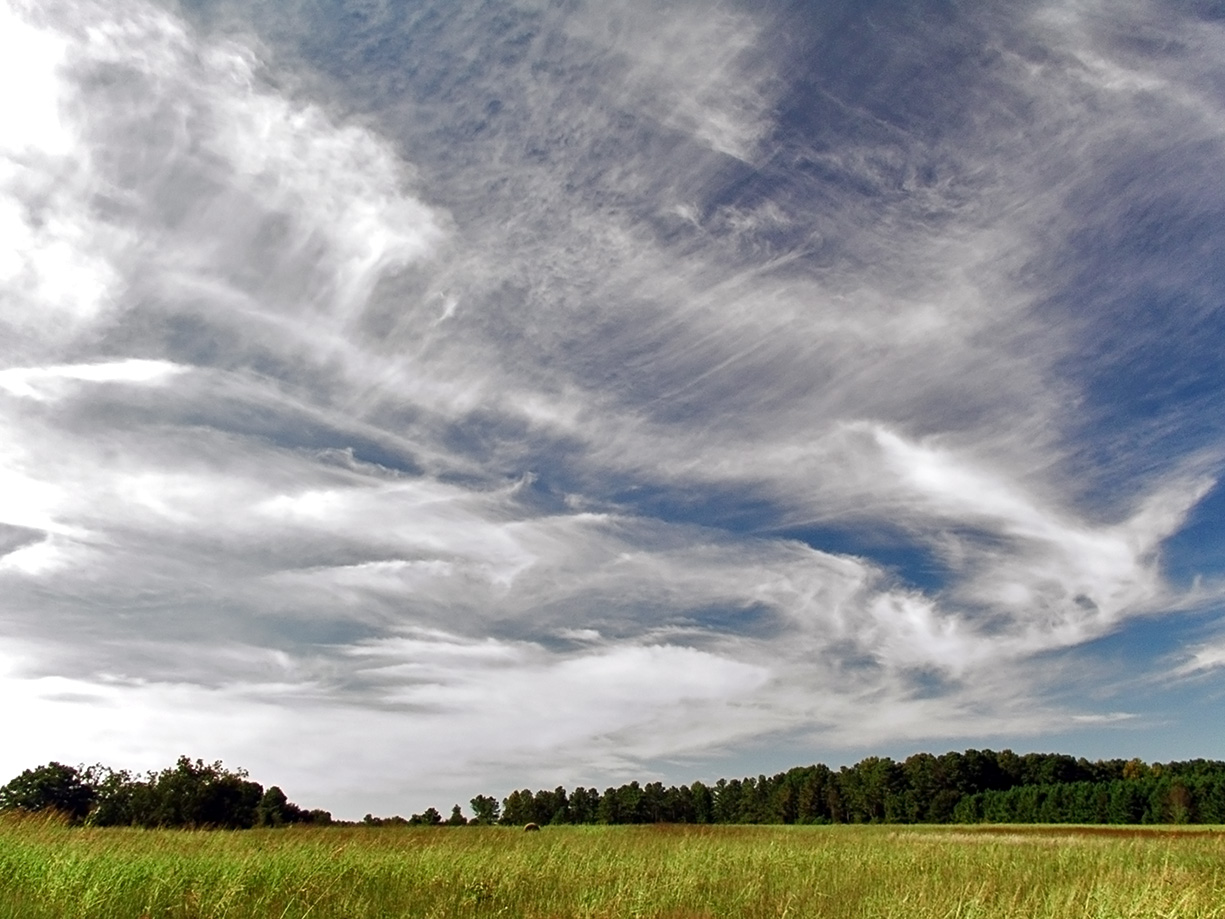
Sky containing different types of cirrus clouds

Cirrus (cloud classification symbol: Ci) is a genus of high-altitude cloud made of ice crystals. Cirrus clouds typically appear delicate and wispy with white strands. In the Earth's atmosphere, cirrus are usually formed when warm, dry air rises, causing water vapor deposition onto mineral dust and metallic particles at high altitudes. Globally, they form anywhere between 6,000 and 20,000 meters (20,000 and 66,000 feet) above sea level, with the higher elevations usually in the tropics and the lower elevations in more polar regions.

Cirrus clouds can form from the tops of thunderstorms and tropical cyclones and sometimes predict the arrival of rain or storms. Although they are a sign that rain and maybe storms are on the way, cirrus themselves drop no more than falling streaks of ice crystals. These crystals dissipate, melt, and evaporate as they fall through warmer and drier air and never reach the ground. The word cirrus comes from the Latin prefix cirro-, meaning "tendril" or "curl". Cirrus clouds warm the earth, potentially contributing to climate change.

Optical phenomena, such as sun dogs and halos, can be produced by light interacting with ice crystals in cirrus clouds. There are two other high-level cirrus-like clouds called cirrostratus and cirrocumulus. Cirrostratus looks like a sheet of cloud, whereas cirrocumulus looks like a pattern of small cloud tufts. Unlike cirrus and cirrostratus, cirrocumulus clouds contain droplets of supercooled (below freezing point) water.

Cirrus clouds form in the atmosphere of the planets Mars, Jupiter, Saturn, Uranus, and Neptune, as well as of the satellite Titan, Saturn's largest moon. Some of these extraterrestrial cirrus clouds are made of ammonia or methane, much like water ice in cirrus on Earth. Some interstellar clouds, made of grains of dust smaller than a thousandth of a millimeter, are also called cirrus.

== Description ==
Species of cirrus clouds

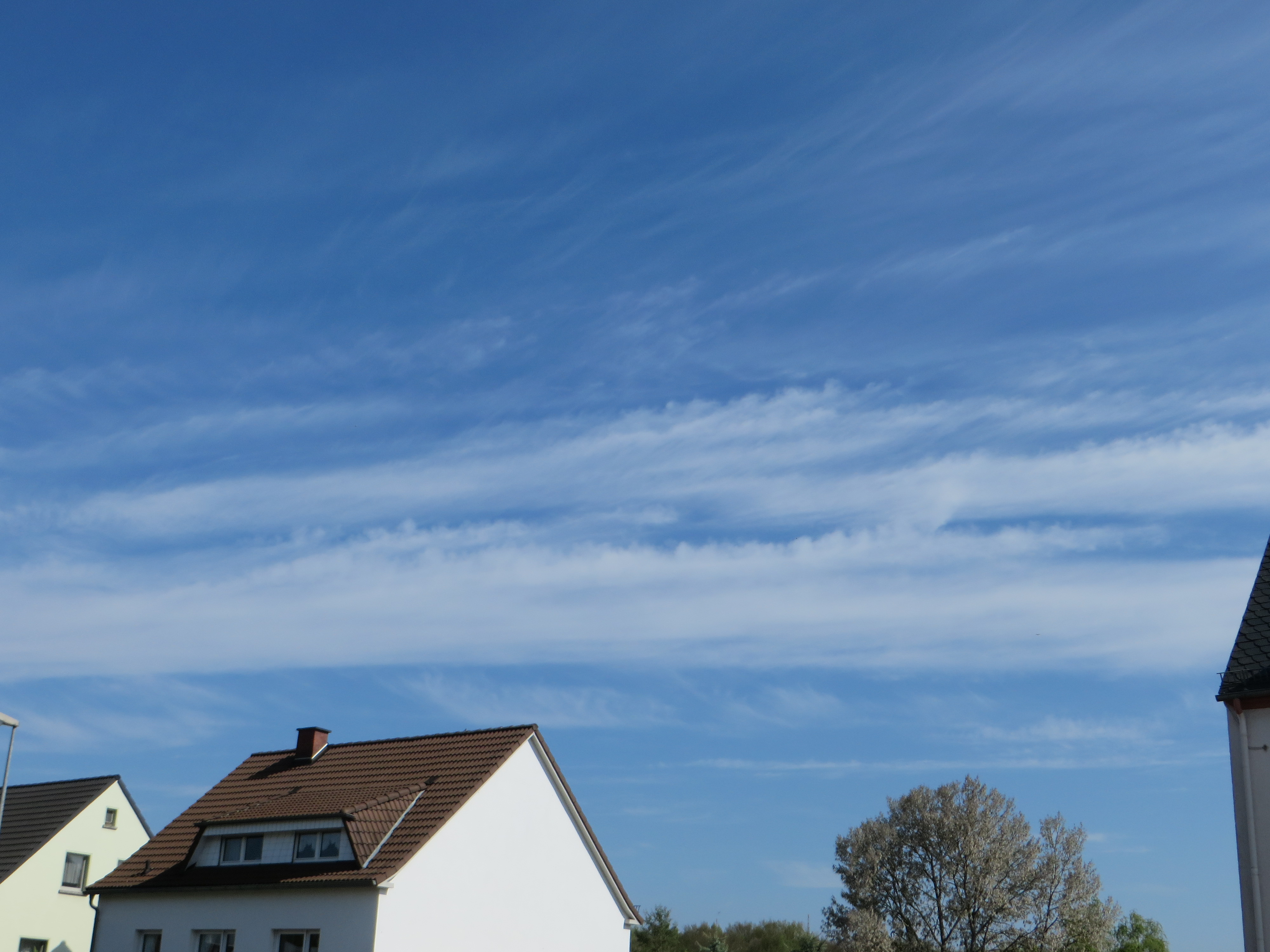
Cirrus castellanus

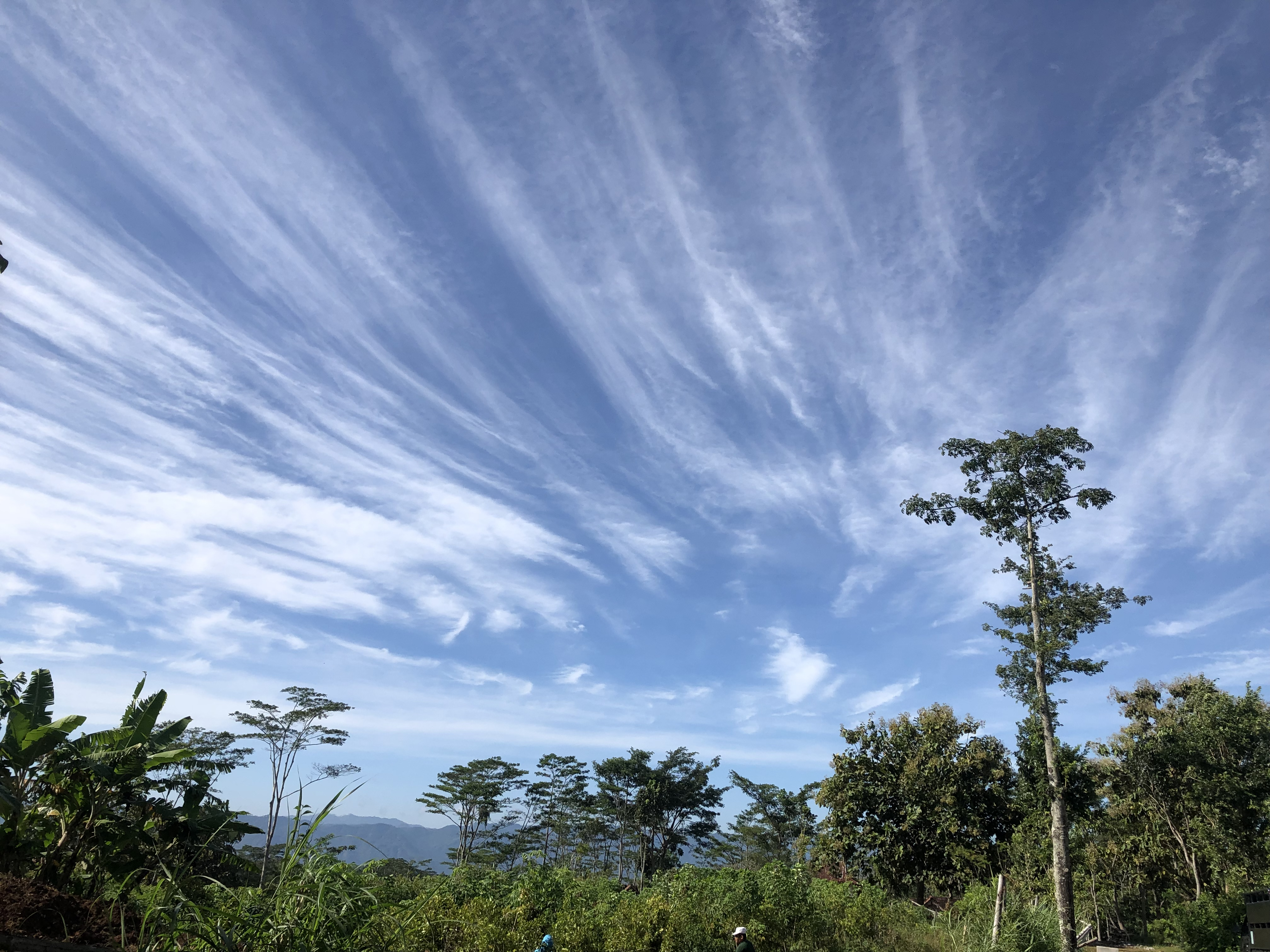
Cirrus fibratus

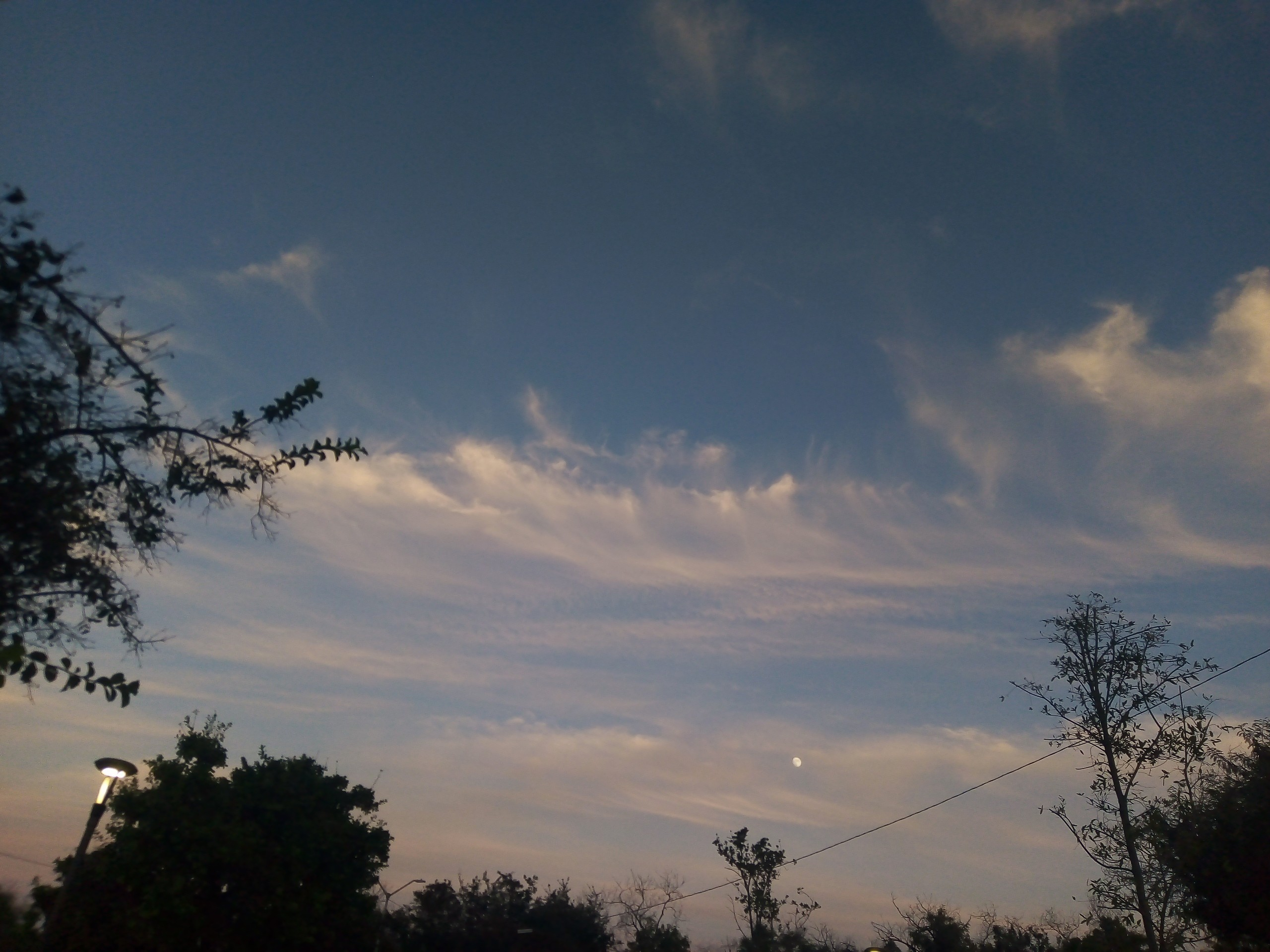
Cirrus floccus

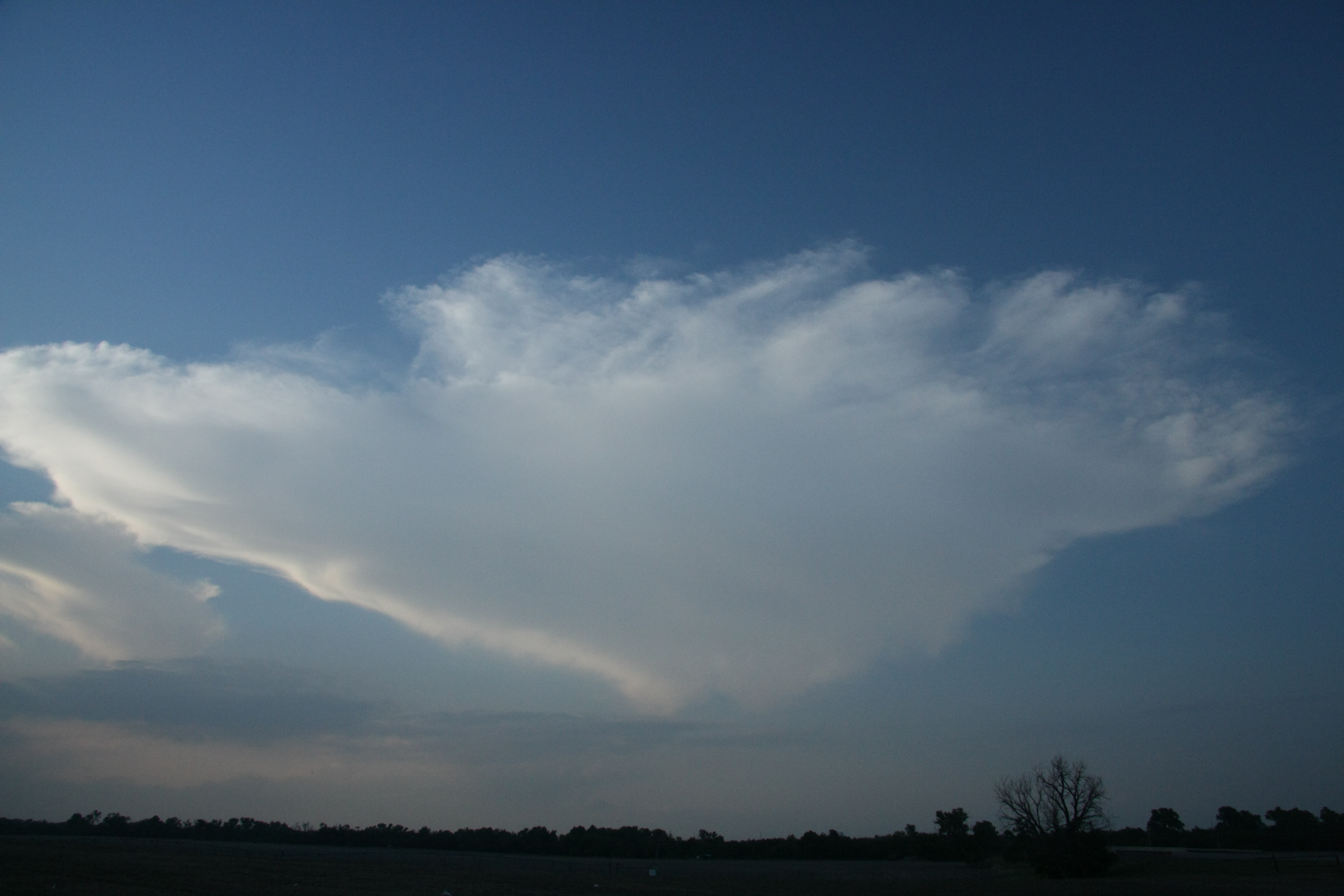
Cirrus spissatus

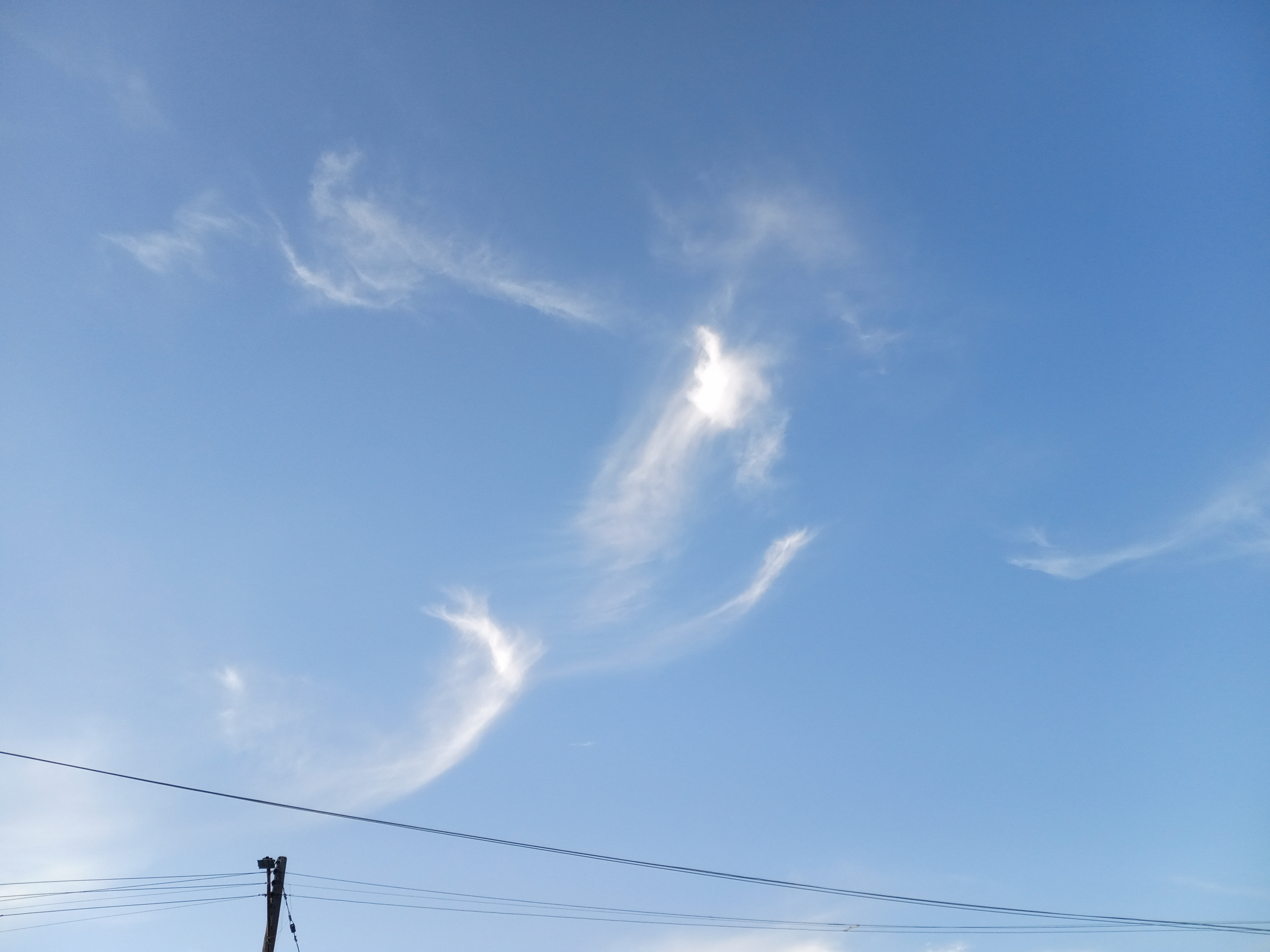
Cirrus uncinus, commonly called mare's tails

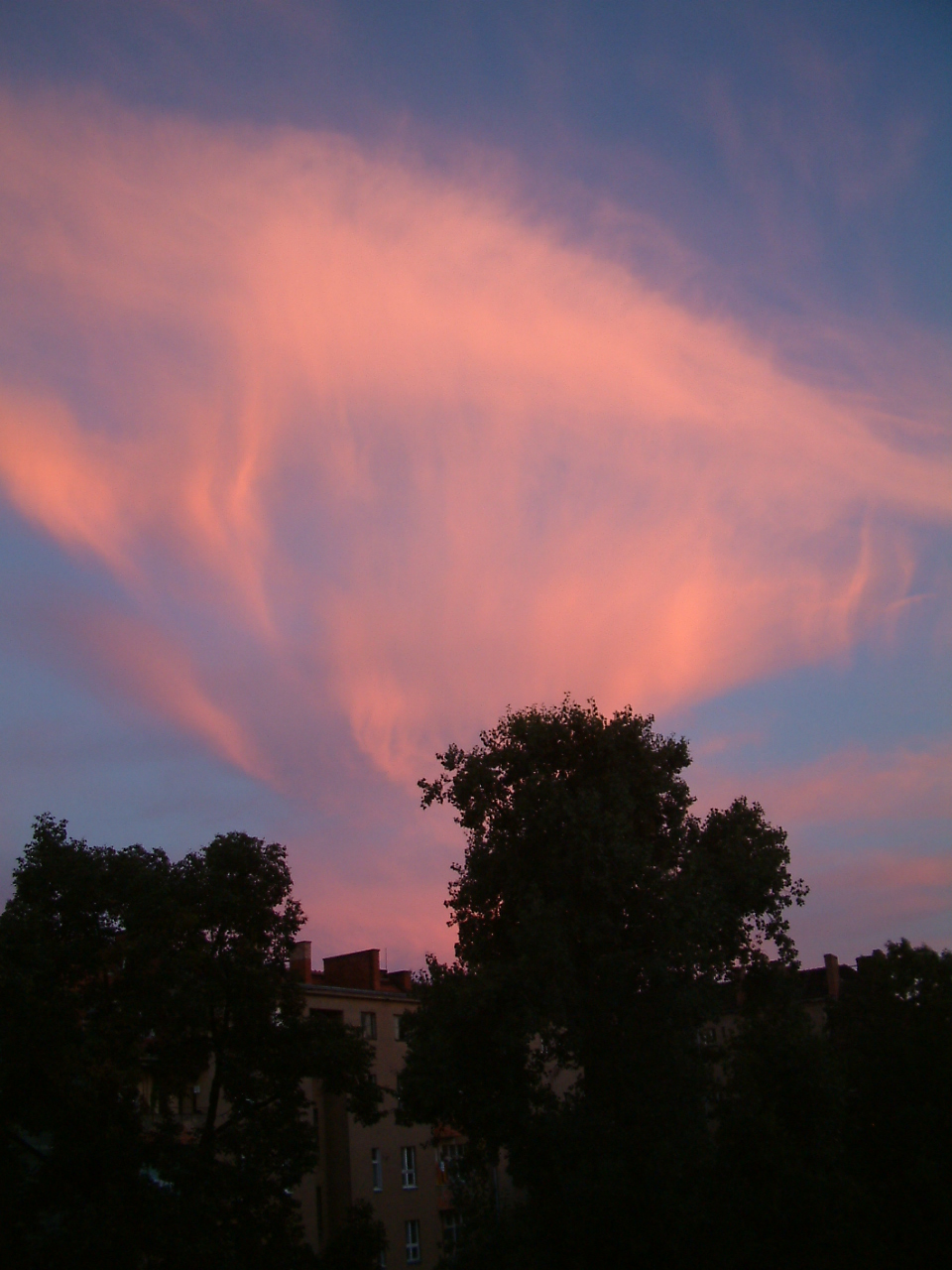
Fall streaks in a cirrus cloud

Cirrus are wispy clouds made of long strands of water crystals that are described as feathery, hair-like, or layered in appearance. First defined scientifically by Luke Howard in an 1803 paper, their name is derived from the Latin word cirrus, meaning 'curl' or 'fringe'. They are transparent, meaning that the sun can be seen through them. Ice crystals in the clouds usually cause them to appear white, but the rising or setting sun can color them various shades of yellow or red. At dusk, they can appear gray.

Cirrus comes in five visually-distinct species: castellanus, fibratus, floccus, spissatus, and uncinus:

- Cirrus castellanus has cumuliform tops caused by high-altitude convection rising up from the main cloud body.
- Cirrus fibratus looks striated and is the most common cirrus species.
- Cirrus floccus species looks like a series of tufts.
- Cirrus spissatus is a particularly dense form of cirrus that often forms from thunderstorms.
- Cirrus uncinus clouds are hooked and are the form that is usually called mare's tails.

Each species is divided into up to four varieties: intortus, vertebratus, radiatus, and duplicatus:

- Intortus variety has an extremely contorted shape, with Kelvin–Helmholtz waves being a form of cirrus intortus that has been twisted into loops by layers of wind blowing at different speeds, called wind shear.
- Radiatus variety has large, radial bands of cirrus clouds that stretch across the sky.
- Vertebratus variety occurs when cirrus clouds are arranged side-by-side like ribs.
- Duplicatus variety occurs when cirrus clouds are arranged above one another in layers.

Cirrus clouds often produce hair-like filaments called fall streaks, made of heavier ice crystals that fall from the cloud. These are similar to the virga produced in liquid–water clouds. The sizes and shapes of fall streaks are determined by the wind shear.

Cirrus cloud cover varies diurnally. During the day, cirrus cloud cover drops, and during the night, it increases. Based on CALIPSO satellite data, cirrus covers an average of 31% to 32% of the Earth's surface. Cirrus cloud cover varies wildly by location, with some parts of the tropics reaching up to 70% cirrus cloud cover. Polar regions, on the other hand, have significantly less cirrus cloud cover, with some areas having a yearly average of only around 10% coverage. These percentages treat clear days and nights, as well as days and nights with other cloud types, as lack of cirrus cloud cover.

== Formation ==
Cirrus clouds are usually formed as warm, dry air rises, causing water vapor to undergo deposition onto particles, including mostly mineral dust and metallic particles at high altitudes. Particles gathered by research aircraft from cirrus clouds over several locations above North America and Central America included mineral dust (containing aluminum, potassium, calcium, iron, and silicon), metallic particles in elemental, sulfate and oxide forms (containing sodium, potassium, iron, nickel, copper, zinc, tin, silver, molybdenum and lead), possible biological particles (containing oxygen, carbon, nitrogen and phosphorus) and elemental carbon. The authors concluded that mineral dust contributed the largest number of ice nuclei to cirrus cloud formation.

The average cirrus cloud altitude increases as latitude decreases, but the altitude is always capped by the tropopause. These conditions commonly occur at the leading edge of a warm front. Because absolute humidity is low at such high altitudes, this genus tends to be fairly transparent. Cirrus clouds can also form inside fallstreak holes (also called "cavum").

At latitudes of 65° N or S, close to polar regions, cirrus clouds form, on average, only 7,000 m (23,000 ft) above sea level. In temperate regions, at roughly 45° N or S, their average altitude increases to 9,500 m (31,200 ft) above sea level. In tropical regions, at roughly 5° N or S, cirrus clouds form 13,500 m (44,300 ft) above sea level on average. Across the globe, cirrus clouds can form anywhere from 4,000 to 20,000 m (13,000 to 66,000 ft) above sea level. Cirrus clouds form with a vast range of thicknesses. They can be as little as 100 m (330 ft) from top to bottom to as thick as 8,000 m (26,000 ft), Cirrus cloud thickness is usually somewhere between those two extremes, with an average thickness of 1,500 m (4,900 ft).

Convection can cause cirrus clouds to be thicker especially in the tropics where they can reach as thick as 8,000 m (26,000 ft)

The jet stream, a high-level wind band, can stretch cirrus clouds long enough to cross continents. Jet streaks, bands of faster-moving air in the jet stream, can create arcs of cirrus cloud hundreds of kilometers long.

Cirrus cloud formation may be effected by organic aerosols (particles produced by plants) acting as additional nucleation points for ice crystal formation. However, research suggests that cirrus clouds more commonly form on mineral dust or metallic particles rather than on organic ones.

=== Tropical cyclones ===
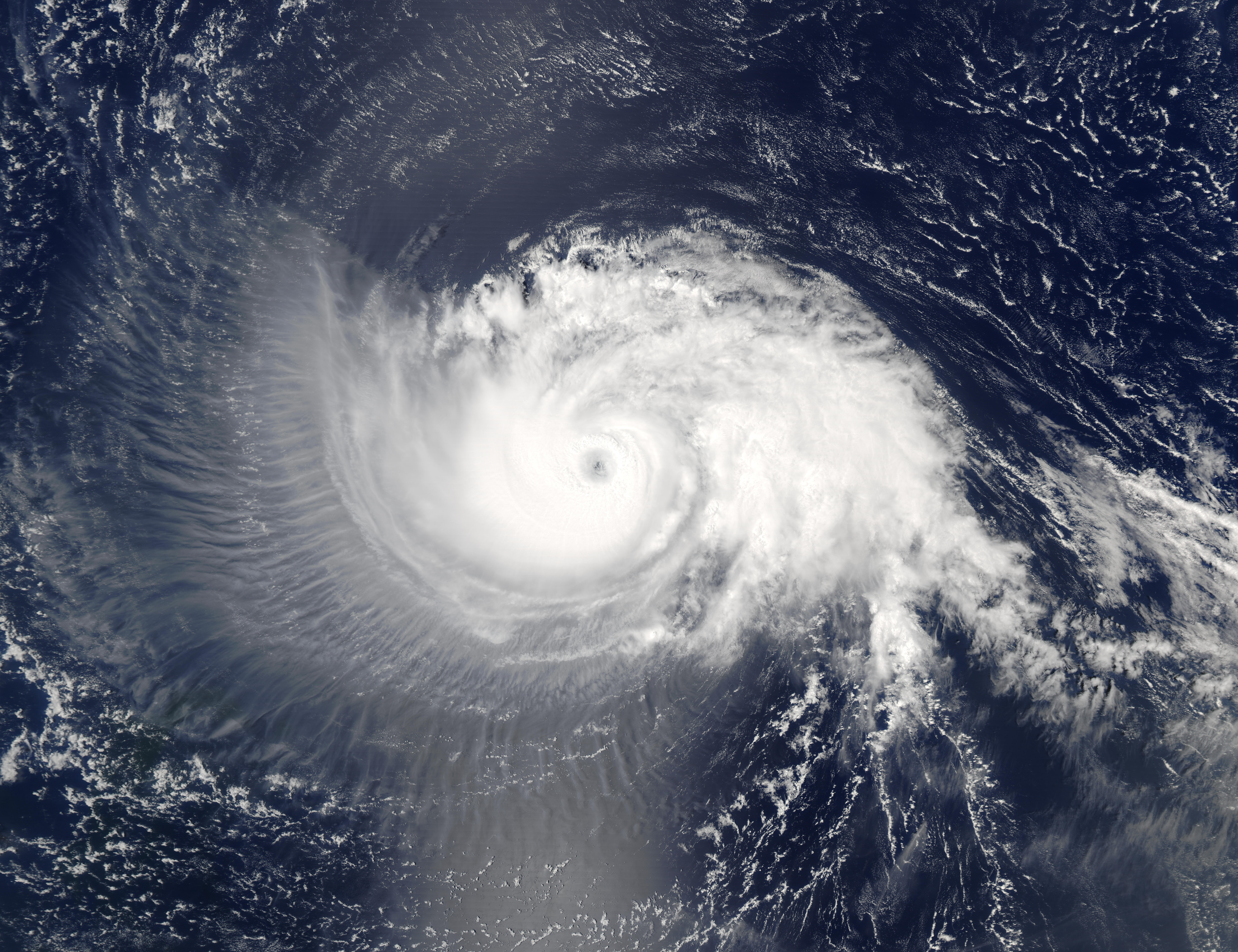
A vast shield of cirrus clouds accompanying the west side of Hurricane Isabel

Sheets of cirrus clouds commonly fan out from the eye walls of tropical cyclones. (The eye wall is the ring of storm clouds surrounding the eye of a tropical cyclone.) A large shield of cirrus and cirrostratus typically accompanies the high altitude outflowing winds of tropical cyclones, and these can make the underlying bands of rain—and sometimes even the eye—difficult to detect in satellite photographs.

=== Thunderstorms ===
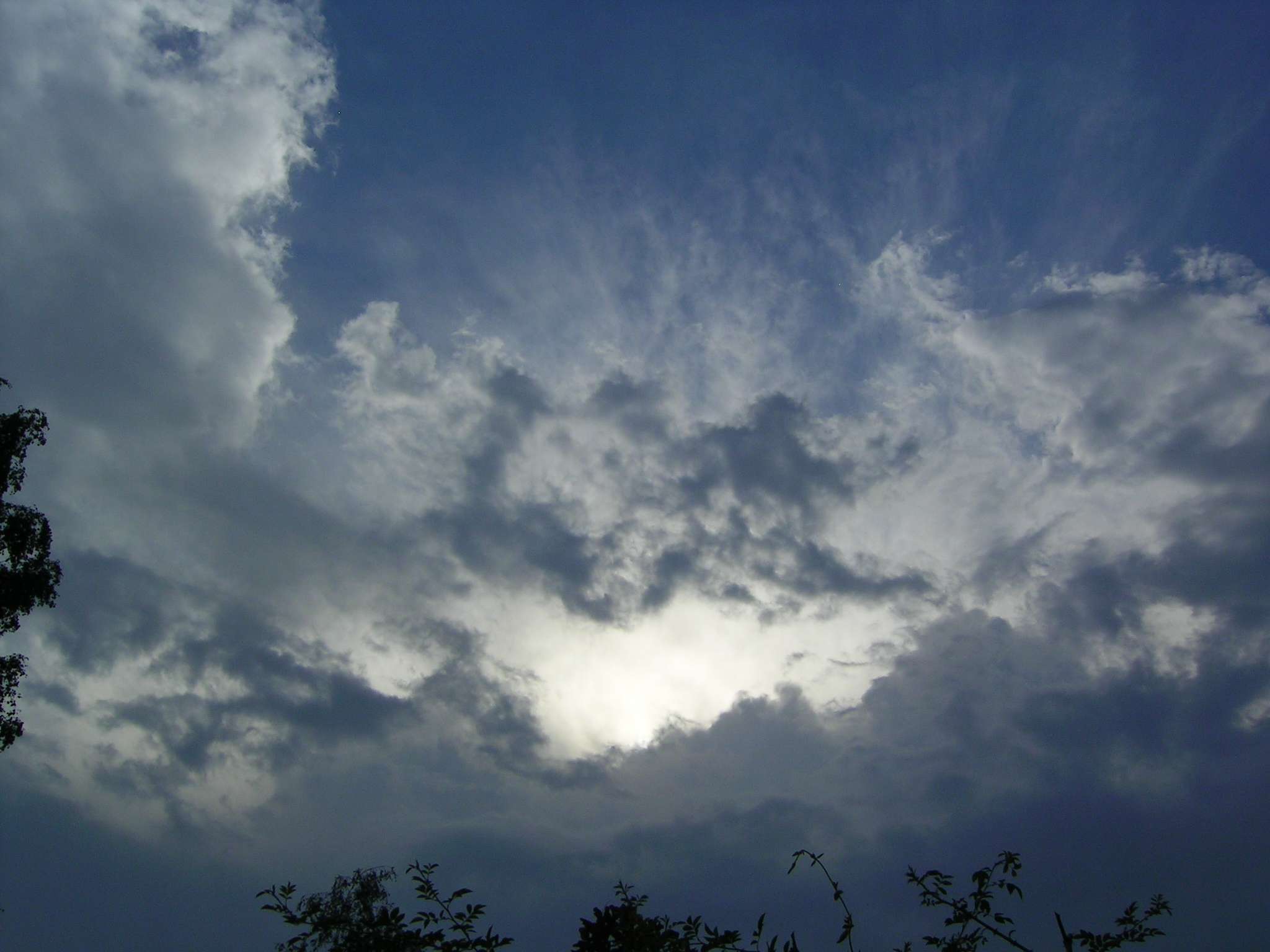
White cirrus in an anvil cloud

Thunderstorms can form dense cirrus at their tops. As the cumulonimbus cloud in a thunderstorm grows vertically, the liquid water droplets freeze when the air temperature reaches the freezing point. The anvil cloud takes its shape because the temperature inversion at the tropopause prevents the warm, moist air forming the thunderstorm from rising any higher, thus creating the flat top. In the tropics, these thunderstorms occasionally produce copious amounts of cirrus from their anvils. High-altitude winds commonly push this dense mat out into an anvil shape that stretches downwind as much as several kilometers.

Individual cirrus cloud formations can be the remnants of anvil clouds formed by thunderstorms. In the dissipating stage of a cumulonimbus cloud, when the normal column rising up to the anvil has evaporated or dissipated, the mat of cirrus in the anvil is all that is left.

=== Contrails ===
Contrails are an artificial type of cirrus cloud formed when water vapor from the exhaust of a jet engine condenses on particles, which come from either the surrounding air or the exhaust itself, and freezes, leaving behind a visible trail. The exhaust can trigger the formation of cirrus by providing ice nuclei when there is an insufficient naturally occurring supply in the atmosphere. One of the environmental impacts of aviation is that persistent contrails can form into large mats of cirrus, and increased air traffic has been implicated as one possible cause of the increasing frequency and amount of cirrus in Earth's atmosphere.

== Use in forecasting ==
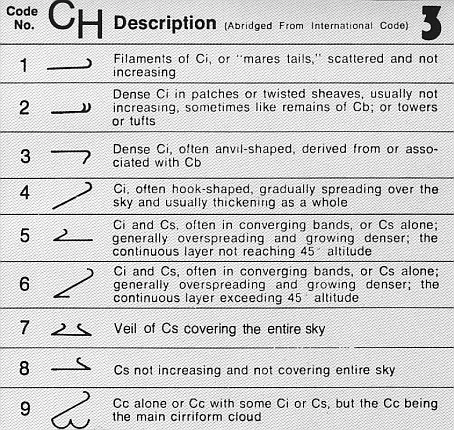
High cloud weather map symbols

Random, isolated cirrus do not have any particular significance. A large number of cirrus clouds can be a sign of an approaching frontal system or upper air disturbance. The appearance of cirrus signals a change in weather—usually more stormy—in the near future. If the cloud is a cirrus castellanus, there might be instability at the high altitude level. When the clouds deepen and spread, especially when they are of the cirrus radiatus variety or cirrus fibratus species, this usually indicates an approaching weather front. If it is a warm front, the cirrus clouds spread out into cirrostratus, which then thicken and lower into altocumulus and altostratus. The next set of clouds are the rain-bearing nimbostratus clouds. When cirrus clouds precede a cold front, squall line or multicellular thunderstorm, it is because they are blown off the anvil, and the next clouds to arrive are the cumulonimbus clouds. Kelvin-Helmholtz waves indicate extreme wind shear at high levels. When a jet streak creates a large arc of cirrus, weather conditions may be right for the development of winter storms.

Within the tropics, 36 hours prior to the center passage of a tropical cyclone, a veil of white cirrus clouds approaches from the direction of the cyclone. In the mid- to late-19th century, forecasters used these cirrus veils to predict the arrival of hurricanes. In the early 1870s the president of Belén College in Havana, Father Benito Viñes, developed the first hurricane forecasting system; he mainly used the motion of these clouds in formulating his predictions. He would observe the clouds hourly from 4:00 am to 10:00 pm. After accumulating enough information, Viñes began accurately predicting the paths of hurricanes; he summarized his observations in his book Apuntes Relativos a los Huracanes de las Antilles, published in English as Practical Hints in Regard to West Indian Hurricanes.

== Effects on climate ==
Cirrus clouds cover up to 25% of the Earth (up to 70% in the tropics at night) and have a net heating effect. When they are thin and translucent, the clouds efficiently absorb outgoing infrared radiation while only marginally reflecting the incoming sunlight. When cirrus clouds are 100 m (330 ft) thick, they reflect only around 9% of the incoming sunlight, but they prevent almost 50% of the outgoing infrared radiation from escaping, thus raising the temperature of the atmosphere beneath the clouds by an average of 10 °C (18 °F)—a process known as the greenhouse effect.

Cirrus clouds are likely becoming more common due to climate change. As their greenhouse effect is stronger than their reflection of sunlight, this would act as a self-reinforcing feedback. Metallic particles from human sources act as additional nucleation seeds, potentially increasing cirrus cloud cover and thus contributing further to climate change. Aircraft in the upper troposphere can create contrail cirrus clouds if local weather conditions are right. These contrails contribute to climate change.

Cirrus cloud thinning has been proposed as a possible geoengineering approach to reduce climate damage due to carbon dioxide. Cirrus cloud thinning would involve injecting particles into the upper troposphere to reduce the amount of cirrus clouds. The 2021 IPCC Assessment Report expressed low confidence in the cooling effect of cirrus cloud thinning, due to limited understanding.

== Cloud properties ==
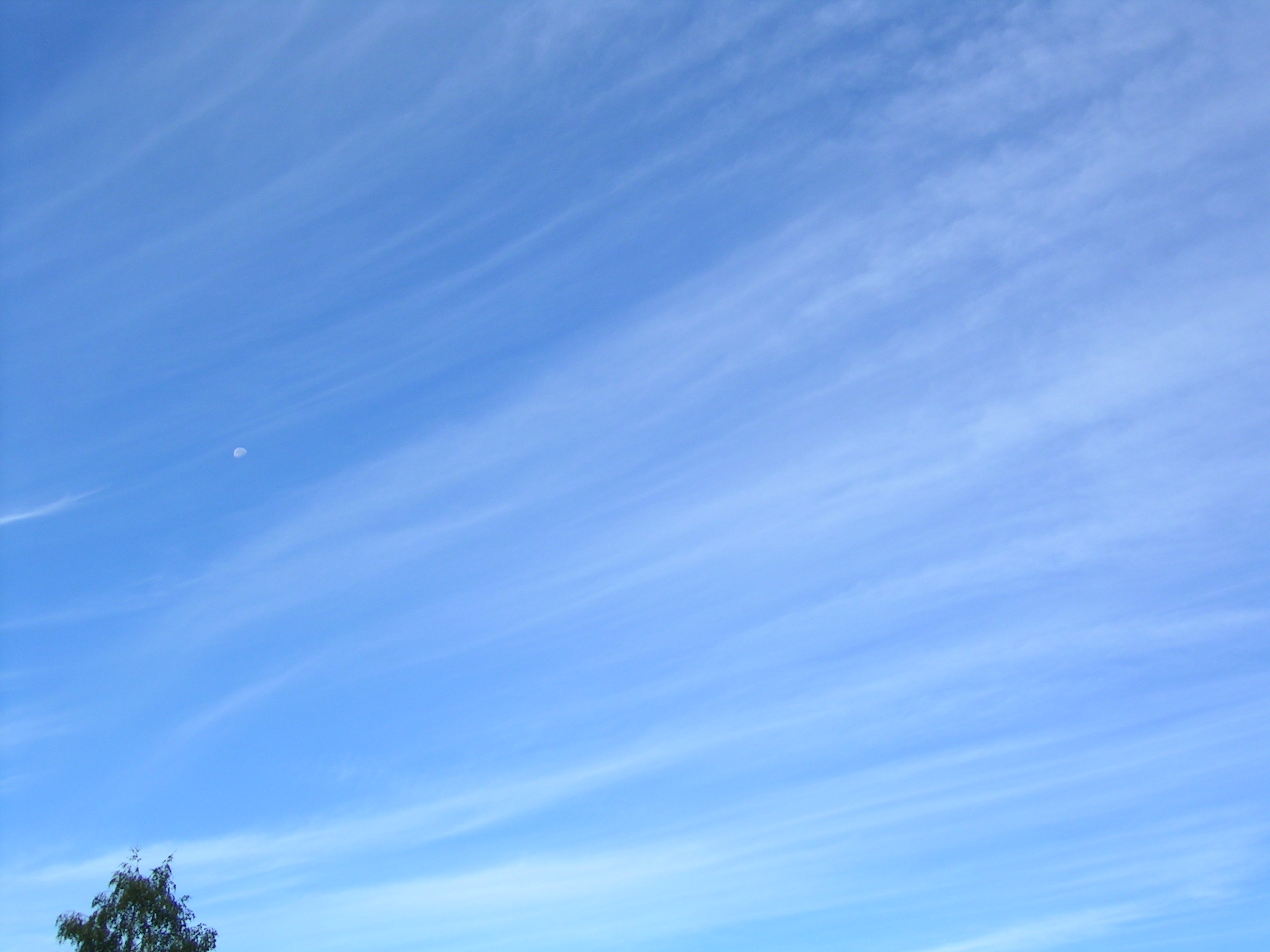
Cirrus clouds merging to cirrocumulus clouds

Scientists have studied the properties of cirrus using several different methods. Lidar (laser-based radar) gives highly accurate information on the cloud's altitude, length, and width. Balloon-carried hygrometers (Note: A hygrometer is a device used to measure humidity.) measure the humidity of the cirrus cloud but are not accurate enough to measure the depth of the cloud. Radar units give information on the altitudes and thicknesses of cirrus clouds. Another data source is satellite measurements from the Stratospheric Aerosol and Gas Experiment program. These satellites measure where infrared radiation is absorbed in the atmosphere, and if it is absorbed at cirrus altitudes, then it is assumed that there are cirrus clouds in that location. NASA's Moderate-Resolution Imaging Spectroradiometer gives information on the cirrus cloud cover by measuring reflected infrared radiation of various specific frequencies during the day. During the night, it determines cirrus cover by detecting the Earth's infrared emissions. The cloud reflects this radiation back to the ground, thus enabling satellites to see the "shadow" it casts into space. Visual observations from aircraft or the ground provide additional information about cirrus clouds. Particle Analysis by Laser Mass Spectrometry (PALMS) (Note: The PALMS instrument utilizes an ultraviolet laser to vaporize aerosol particles in a vacuum. The ionized particles are analyzed with a mass spectrometer to determine mass and composition.) is used to identify the type of nucleation seeds that spawned the ice crystals in a cirrus cloud.

Cirrus clouds have an average ice crystal concentration of 300,000 ice crystals per 10 cubic meters (270,000 ice crystals per 10 cubic yards). The concentration ranges from as low as 1 ice crystal per 10 cubic meters to as high as 100 million ice crystals per 10 cubic meters (just under 1 ice crystal per 10 cubic yards to 77 million ice crystals per 10 cubic yards), a difference of eight orders of magnitude. The size of each ice crystal is typically 0.25 millimeters, but they range from as short as 0.01 millimeters up to several millimeters. The ice crystals in contrails can be much smaller than those in naturally occurring cirrus cloud, being around 0.001 millimeters to 0.1 millimeters in length.

In addition to forming in different sizes, the ice crystals in cirrus clouds can crystallize in different shapes: solid columns, hollow columns, plates, rosettes, and conglomerations of the various other types. The shape of the ice crystals is determined by the air temperature, atmospheric pressure, and ice supersaturation (the amount by which the relative humidity exceeds 100%). Cirrus in temperate regions typically have the various ice crystal shapes separated by type. The columns and plates concentrate near the top of the cloud, whereas the rosettes and conglomerations concentrate near the base. In the northern Arctic region, cirrus clouds tend to be composed of only the columns, plates, and conglomerations, and these crystals tend to be at least four times larger than the minimum size. In Antarctica, cirrus are usually composed of only columns which are much longer than normal.

Cirrus clouds are usually colder than −20 °C (−4 °F). At temperatures above −68 °C (−90 °F), most cirrus clouds have relative humidities of roughly 100% (that is they are saturated). Cirrus can supersaturate, with relative humidities over ice that can exceed 200%. Below −68 °C (−90 °F) there are more of both undersaturated and supersaturated cirrus clouds. The more supersaturated clouds are probably young cirrus.

== Optical phenomena ==
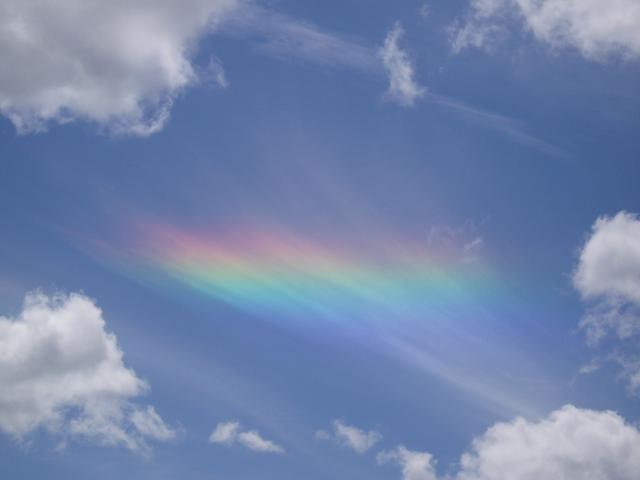
Circumhorizontal arc

Cirrus clouds can produce several optical effects like halos around the Sun and Moon. Halos are caused by interaction of the light with hexagonal ice crystals present in the clouds which, depending on their shape and orientation, can result in a wide variety of white and colored rings, arcs and spots in the sky, including sun dogs, the 46° halo, the 22° halo, and circumhorizontal arcs. Circumhorizontal arcs are only visible when the Sun rises higher than 58° above the horizon, preventing observers at higher latitudes from ever being able to see them.

More rarely, cirrus clouds are capable of producing glories, more commonly associated with liquid water-based clouds such as stratus. A glory is a set of concentric, faintly colored glowing rings that appear around the shadow of the observer, and are best observed from a high viewpoint or from a plane. Cirrus clouds only form glories when the constituent ice crystals are aspherical; researchers suggest that the ice crystals must be between 0.009 millimeters and 0.015 millimeters in length for a glory to appear.

== Relation to other clouds ==
Heights of various cloud genera including high-, mid-, and low-level clouds

Cirrus clouds are one of three different genera of high-level clouds, all of which are given the prefix "cirro-". The other two genera are cirrocumulus and cirrostratus. High-level clouds usually form above 6,100 m (20,000 ft). Cirrocumulus and cirrostratus are sometimes informally referred to as cirriform clouds because of their frequent association with cirrus.

In the intermediate range, from 2,000 to 6,100 m (6,500 to 20,000 ft), are the mid-level clouds, which are given the prefix "alto-". They comprise two genera, altostratus and altocumulus. These clouds are formed from ice crystals, supercooled water droplets, or liquid water droplets.

Low-level clouds usually form below 2,000 m (6,500 ft) and do not have a prefix. The two genera that are strictly low-level are stratus, and stratocumulus. These clouds are composed of water droplets, except during winter when they are formed of supercooled water droplets or ice crystals if the temperature at cloud level is below freezing. Three additional genera usually form in the low-altitude range, but may be based at higher levels under conditions of very low humidity. They are the genera cumulus, and cumulonimbus, and nimbostratus. These are sometimes classified separately as clouds of vertical development, especially when their tops are high enough to be composed of supercooled water droplets or ice crystals.

=== Cirrocumulus ===
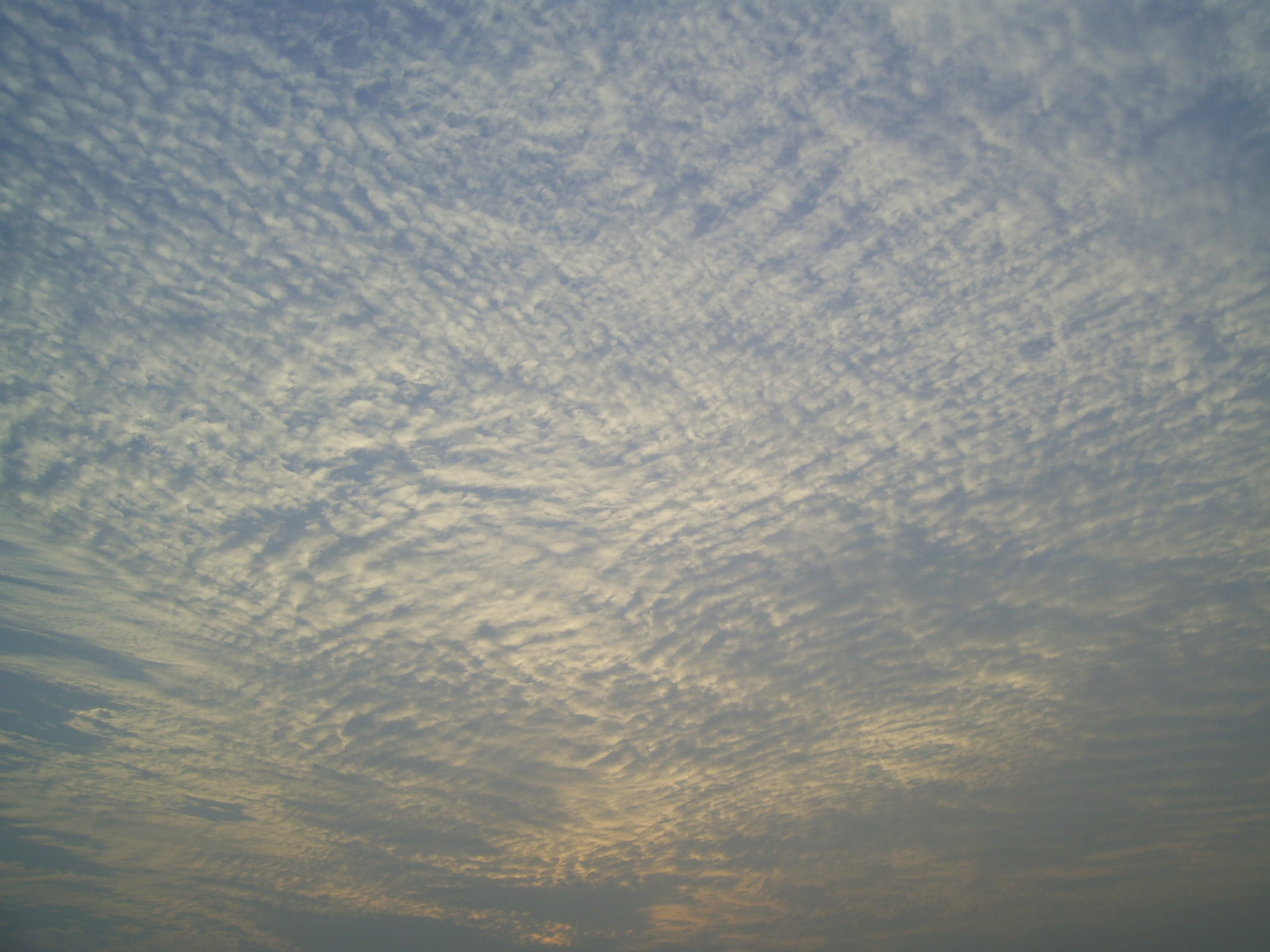
Large field of cirrocumulus clouds

Cirrocumulus clouds form in sheets or patches and do not cast shadows. They commonly appear in regular, rippling patterns or in rows of clouds with clear areas between. Cirrocumulus are, like other members of the cumuliform category, formed via convective processes. Significant growth of these patches indicates high-altitude instability and can signal the approach of poorer weather. The ice crystals in the bottoms of cirrocumulus clouds tend to be in the form of hexagonal cylinders. They are not solid, but instead tend to have stepped funnels coming in from the ends. Towards the top of the cloud, these crystals have a tendency to clump together. These clouds do not last long, and they tend to change into cirrus because as the water vapor continues to deposit on the ice crystals, they eventually begin to fall, destroying the upward convection. The cloud then dissipates into cirrus. Cirrocumulus clouds come in four species: stratiformis, lenticularis, castellanus, and floccus. They are iridescent when the constituent supercooled water droplets are all about the same size.

=== Cirrostratus ===
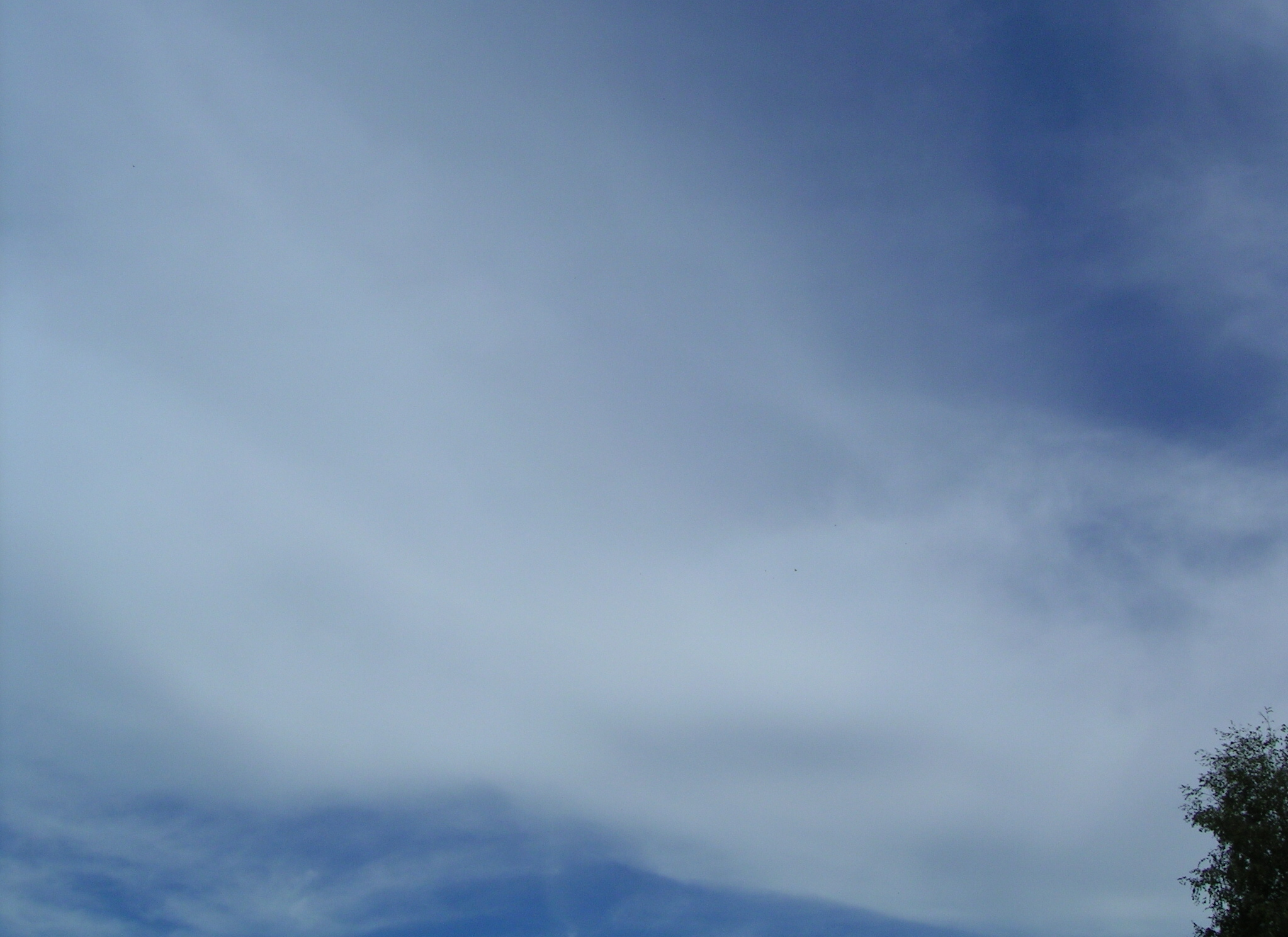
Cirrostratus cloud

Cirrostratus clouds can appear as a milky sheen in the sky or as a striated sheet. They are sometimes similar to altostratus and are distinguishable from the latter because the Sun or Moon is always clearly visible through transparent cirrostratus, in contrast to altostratus which tends to be opaque or translucent. Cirrostratus come in two species, fibratus and nebulosus. The ice crystals in these clouds vary depending upon the height in the cloud. Towards the bottom, at temperatures of around −35 to −45 °C (−31 to −49 °F), the crystals tend to be long, solid, hexagonal columns. Towards the top of the cloud, at temperatures of around −47 to −52 °C (−53 to −62 °F), the predominant crystal types are thick, hexagonal plates and short, solid, hexagonal columns. These clouds commonly produce halos, and sometimes the halo is the only indication that such clouds are present. They are formed by warm, moist air being lifted slowly to a very high altitude. When a warm front approaches, cirrostratus clouds become thicker and descend forming altostratus clouds, and rain usually begins 12 to 24 hours later.

== Other planets ==
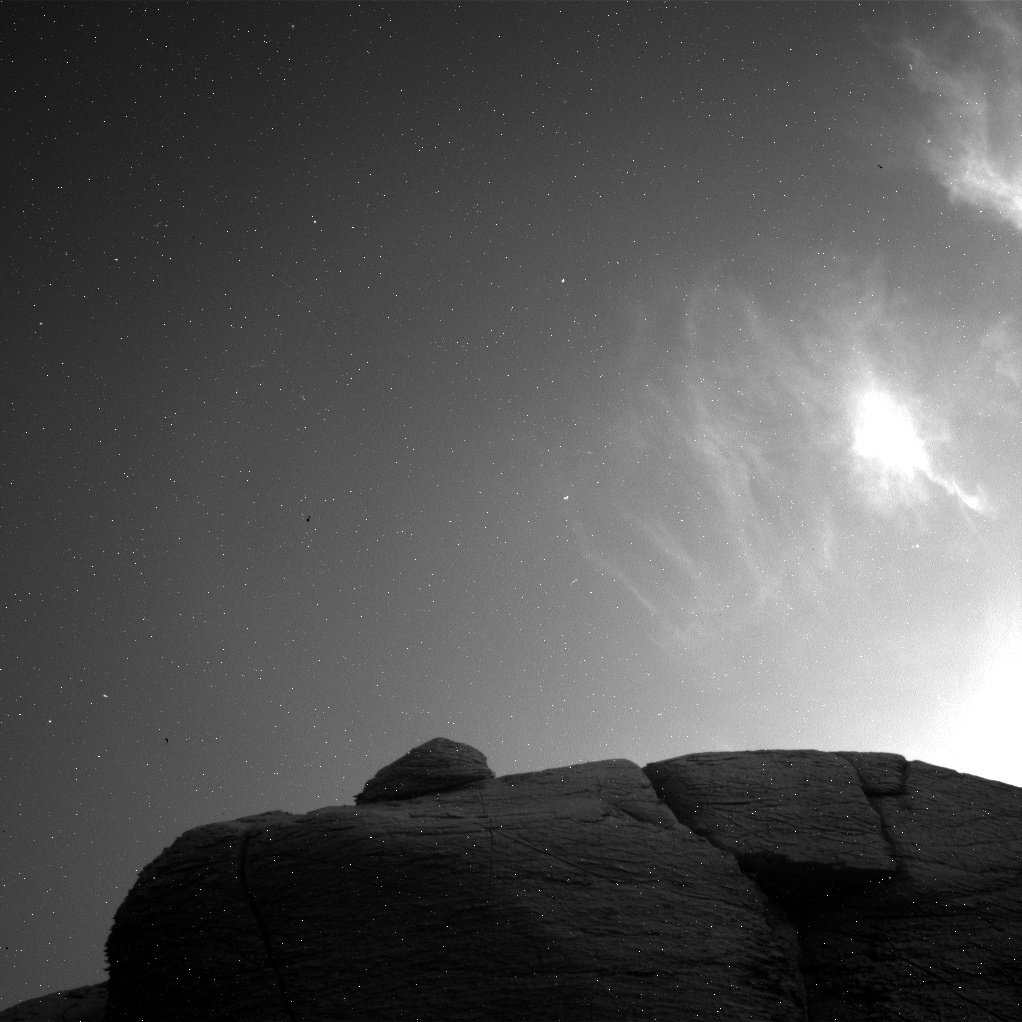
A composite black-and-white photograph showing cirrus clouds over the surface of Mars

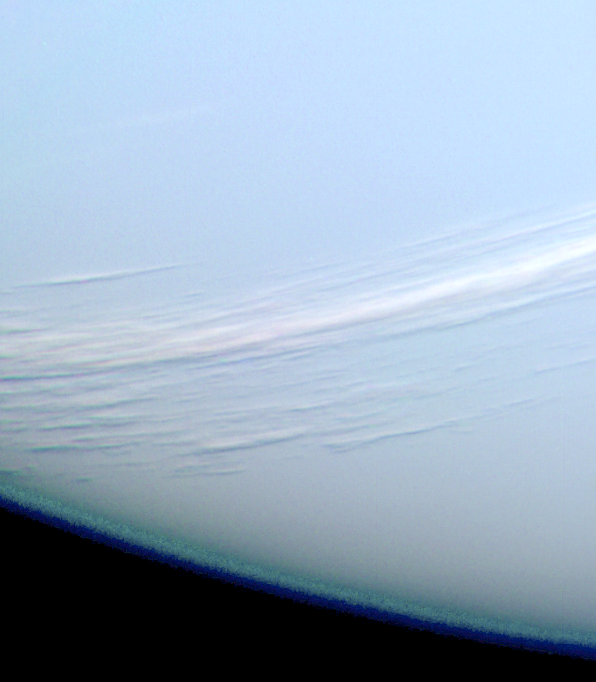
Cirrus clouds on Neptune, captured during Voyager 2's flyby

Cirrus clouds have been observed on several other planets. In 2008, the Martian Lander Phoenix took a time-lapse photograph of a group of cirrus clouds moving across the Martian sky using lidar. Near the end of its mission, the Phoenix Lander detected more thin clouds close to the north pole of Mars. Over the course of several days, they thickened, lowered, and eventually began snowing. The total precipitation was only a few thousandths of a millimeter. James Whiteway from York University concluded that "precipitation is a component of the [Martian] hydrologic cycle". These clouds formed during the Martian night in two layers, one around 4,000 m (13,000 ft) above ground and the other at surface level. They lasted through early morning before being burned away by the Sun. The crystals in these clouds were formed at a temperature of −65 °C (−85 °F), and they were shaped roughly like ellipsoids 0.127 millimeters long and 0.042 millimeters wide.

On Jupiter, cirrus clouds are composed of ammonia. When Jupiter's South Equatorial Belt disappeared, one hypothesis put forward by Glenn Orten was that a large quantity of ammonia cirrus clouds had formed above it, hiding it from view. NASA's Cassini probe detected these clouds on Saturn and thin water-ice cirrus on Saturn's moon Titan. Cirrus clouds composed of methane ice exist on Uranus. On Neptune, thin wispy clouds which could possibly be cirrus have been detected over the Great Dark Spot. As on Uranus, these are probably methane crystals.

Interstellar cirrus clouds are composed of tiny dust grains smaller than a micrometer and are therefore not true cirrus clouds, which are composed of frozen crystals. They range from a few light years to dozens of light years across. While they are not technically cirrus clouds, the dust clouds are referred to as "cirrus" because of their similarity to the clouds on Earth. They emit infrared radiation, similar to the way cirrus clouds on Earth reflect heat being radiated out into space.
