= Cirrus intortus cloud =

Type of cloud

Cirrus intortus
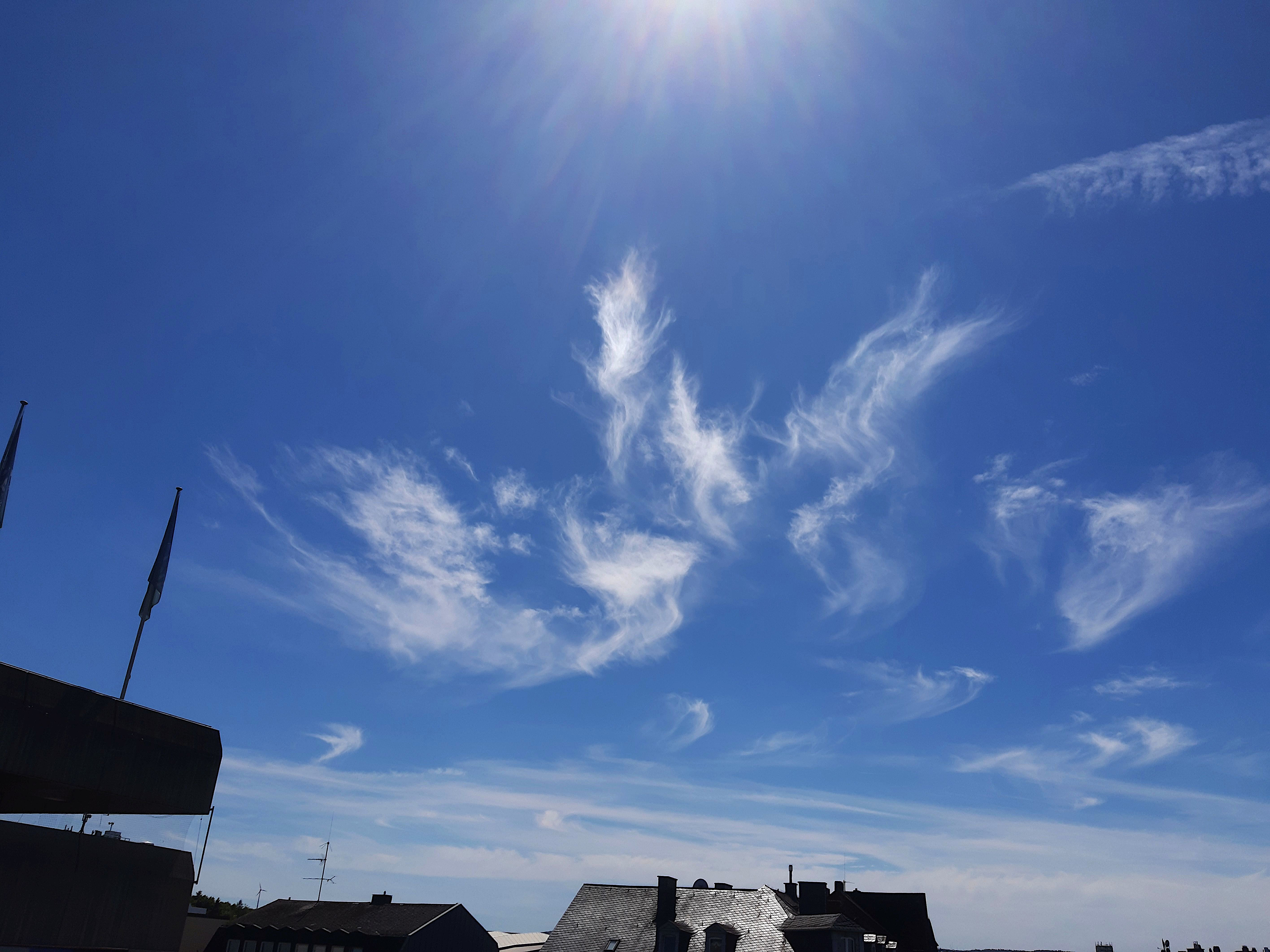
- Abbreviation: Ci in
- Genus: Cirrus (curl)
- Variety: intortus (contorted)
- Altitude: Above 5,000 m (Above 16,500 ft)
- Classification: Family A (High-level)
- Appearance: tangled, interlaced
- Precipitation: No

Cirrus intortus is a variety of cirrus cloud. The name cirrus intortus is derived from Latin, meaning "twisted, wound". The variety of intortus clouds is specific to cirrus clouds, and they appear as interwound strands of cirrus clouds with a purely random pattern. The filaments are often curved in a very irregular pattern.

Like other cirrus clouds, cirrus intortus occur at high altitudes.

== See also ==
- List of cloud types
