= Cirrostratus cloud =

Genus of atmospheric cloud

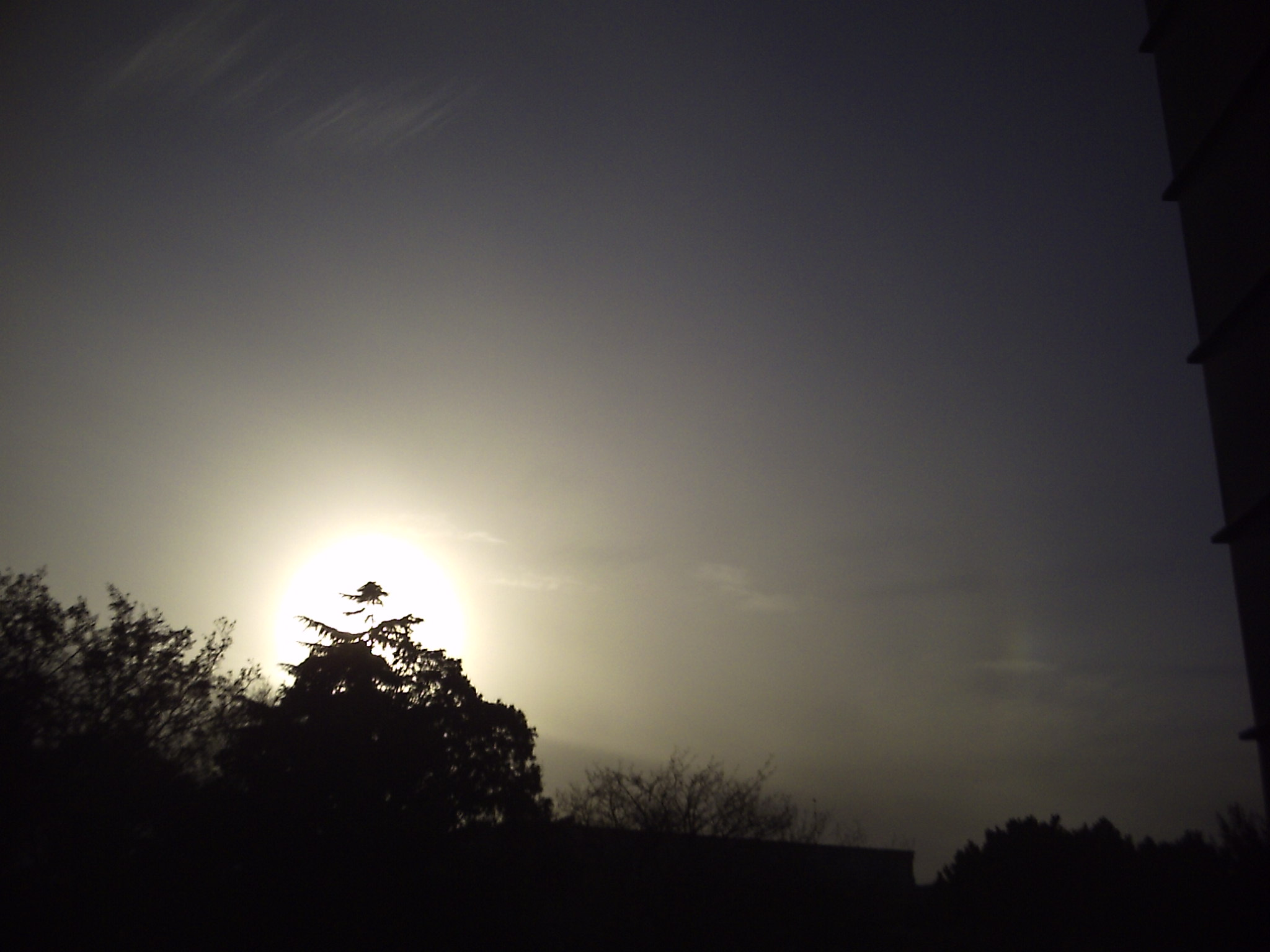
- Cirrostratus nebulosus clouds backlit by the Sun
- Abbreviation: Cs
- Genus: Cirrus ("curl") and -stratus ("layered")
- Species: Fibratus; Nebulosus
- Variety: Duplicatus; Undulatus
- Altitude: 6,000–13,000 m (20,000–43,000 ft)
- Classification: Family A (High-level)
- Appearance: Thin, transparent, high-altitude layer capable of producing a halo
- Precipitation: No, but usually signal the approach of a warm front that may bring rain within 24 hours

Cirrostratus (/ˌsɪroʊˈstrætəs, -ˈstreɪtəs/) is a high-altitude, very thin, and generally uniform stratiform genus-type of cloud. It is composed of ice crystals, which are particles of frozen water. Cirrostratus is difficult to see and can produce halos. These optical effects are caused when the cloud takes the form of thin cirrostratus nebulosus.

The cloud has a fibrous texture with no halos if it is thicker cirrostratus fibratus. On the approach of a frontal system, the cirrostratus often begins as nebulous and turns to fibratus. If the cirrostratus begins as fragmented of clouds in the sky it often means the front is weak. Cirrostratus usually lies above 5.5 km (3.4 mi; 18,000 ft). Its presence indicates a large amount of moisture in the upper troposphere.

Clouds resembling cirrostratus occasionally form in the lower stratosphere over the polar regions of Earth. Polar stratospheric clouds can take on this appearance when composed of tiny supercooled droplets of water or nitric acid.

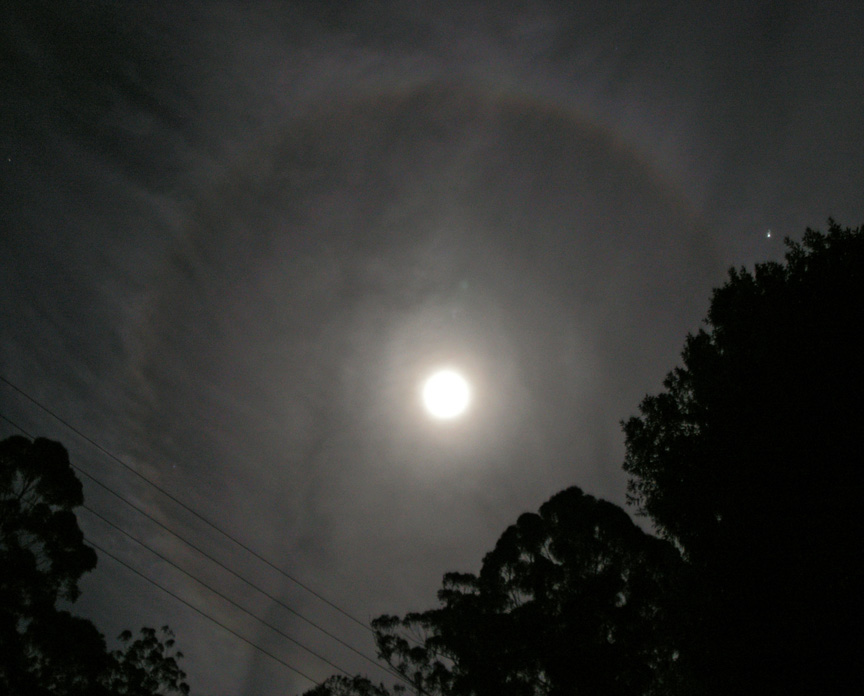
Cirrostratus at night causing a moon halo

Cirrostratus clouds sometimes signal the approach of a warm front if they form after cirrus and spread from one area across the sky, and thus may be signs that precipitation might follow within the next 12–24 hours, or as soon as 6–8 hours if the front moves fast. If the cirrostratus is broken fibratus, it can mean that the front is weak and that stratus rather than nimbostratus will be the precipitating cloud (meaning drizzle or snow grains instead of moderate rain or snow).

Cumulus humilis or stratocumulus clouds are often found below cirrostratus formations, due to the stable air associated with cirrostratus creating an inversion and restricting convection, causing cumuliform clouds to become flattened. Contrails also tend to spread out and can be visible for up to an hour in cirrostratus. The phrase "milky sunshine" is often, as well as referring to haze or light mist, used to refer to the milky appearance of the sky when cirrostratus is present.

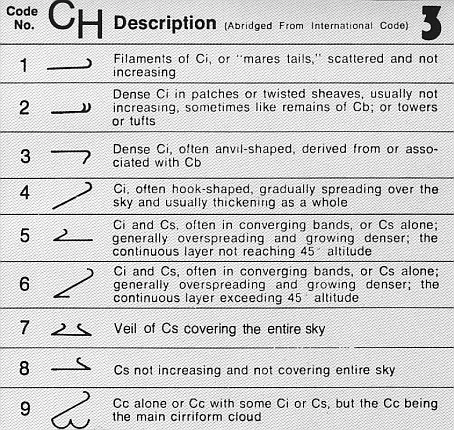
High cloud weather map symbols

- Species: Cirrostratus fibratus (Cs fib) is a high fibrous sheet similar to cirrus but with less detached semi-merged filaments. It is reported in the SYNOP code as C_{H}8 or as C_{H}5 or 6 (depending on the amount of sky covered) if increasing in amount. If the high cloud covers the entire sky and takes on the form of a featureless veil, it is classified as cirrostratus of the species nebulosus (Cs neb) and is coded C_{H}7.

- Varieties: Cirrostratus species have no opacity-based varieties as they are always translucent. Two pattern-based varieties are sometimes seen with the species fibratus. These are the closely spaced duplicatus and wavy undulatus types similar to those seen with cirrus fibratus. Pattern-based varieties are not commonly associated with the species nebulosus due to its lack of features.

- Supplementary features: Cirrostratus produces no precipitation or virga, and is not accompanied by any accessory clouds.
- Genitus mother clouds: Cirrostratus fibratus cirrocumulogenitus sometimes appears as the latter cloud flattens and loses some of its stratocumuliform structure. Cirrostratus fibratus cumulonimbogenitus may form if the cirriform top of a mature thundercloud spreads and flattens sufficiently to become a high stratiform cloud.
- Mutatus mother clouds: Cirrostratus fibratus cirromutatus or cirrocumulomutatus are the result of a complete transformation from cirrus and cirrocumulus genus types. Cirrostratus nebulosis altostratomutatus results when a high grey nebulous altostratus layer thins out into a whitish layer of featureless high cloud.

== See also ==
- Altostratus cloud
- Altostratus undulatus cloud
- Fractus cloud
- Cirrostratus nebulosus
- Nimbostratus cloud
- Stratus cloud
