= Cirrus fibratus =

Type of cloud

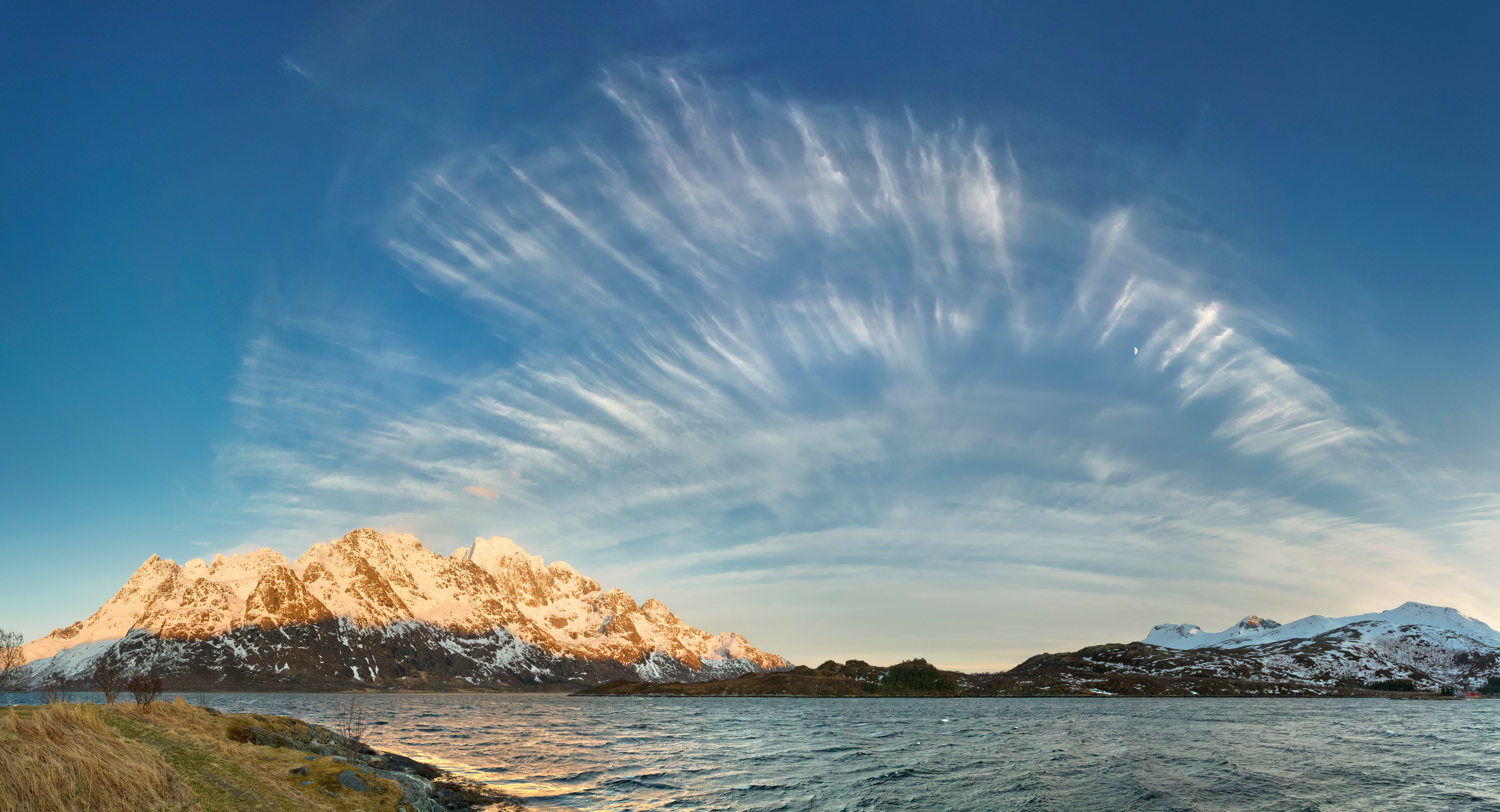
Cirrus fibratus
- Abbreviation: Ci fib
- Genus: Cirrus (curl)
- Species: fibratus (fibered)
- Altitude: Above 6,000 m (Above 20,000 ft)
- Classification: Family A (High-level)
- Appearance: fibers, threads
- Precipitation: No

Cirrus fibratus, also called cirrus filosus, is a type of cirrus cloud. The name cirrus fibratus is derived from Latin, meaning "fibrous". These clouds are similar to cirrus uncinus, commonly known as "mares' tails," yet different in that fibratus clouds do not have tufts or hooks at the end. The filaments are usually separate from one another.

Like other cirrus clouds, cirrus fibratus occurs at high altitudes. They can indicate an approaching warm front and can also be an indication that fair weather will follow. Fibratus clouds indicate high, continuous winds up at cloud level.

== See also ==
- List of cloud types
