= Cirrus uncinus cloud =

Type of cloud

Cirrus uncinus
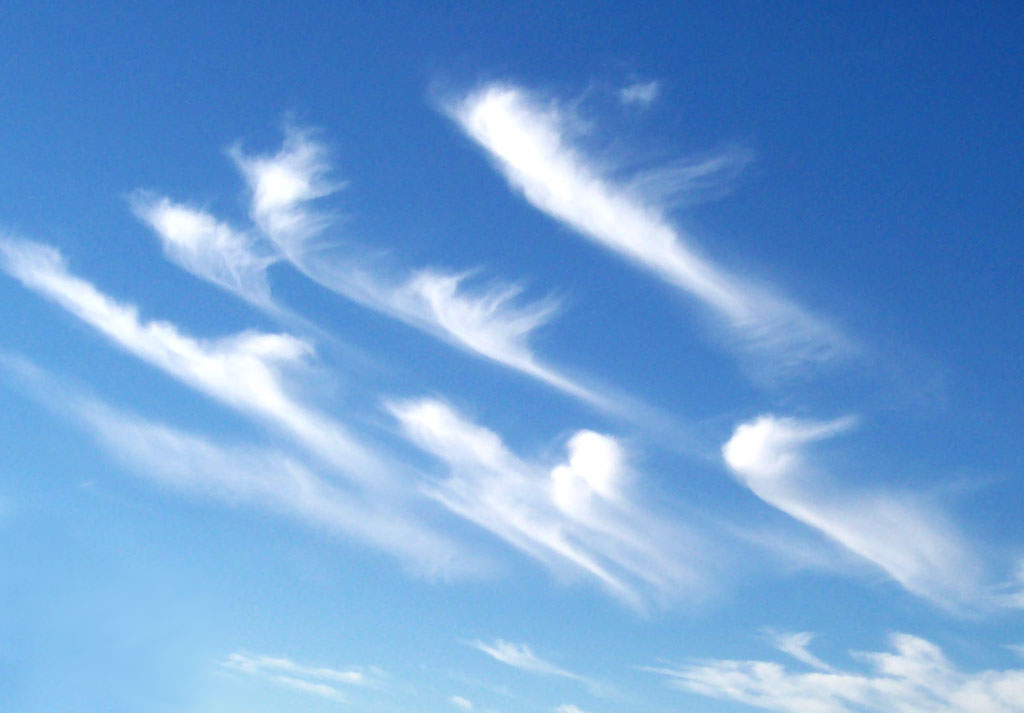
- Cirrus uncinus cloud
- Abbreviation: Ci unc
- Genus: Cirrus ("curl")
- Species: uncinus ("hook")
- Altitude: above 7,000 m (23,000 ft)
- Classification: Family A (High-level)
- Appearance: curly, hooked
- Precipitation: No, but may indicate precipitation approach.

Cirrus uncinus is a type of cirrus cloud. The name cirrus uncinus is Latin for "curly hooks". Commonly called "mare's tail", this cloud species is very thin and generally sparse in the sky.

The clouds occur at high altitudes, at a temperature of about −50 to −40 °C (−58 to −40 °F). They are generally seen when a warm or occluded front is approaching. They are very high in the troposphere and generally mean that precipitation, usually rain, is approaching.

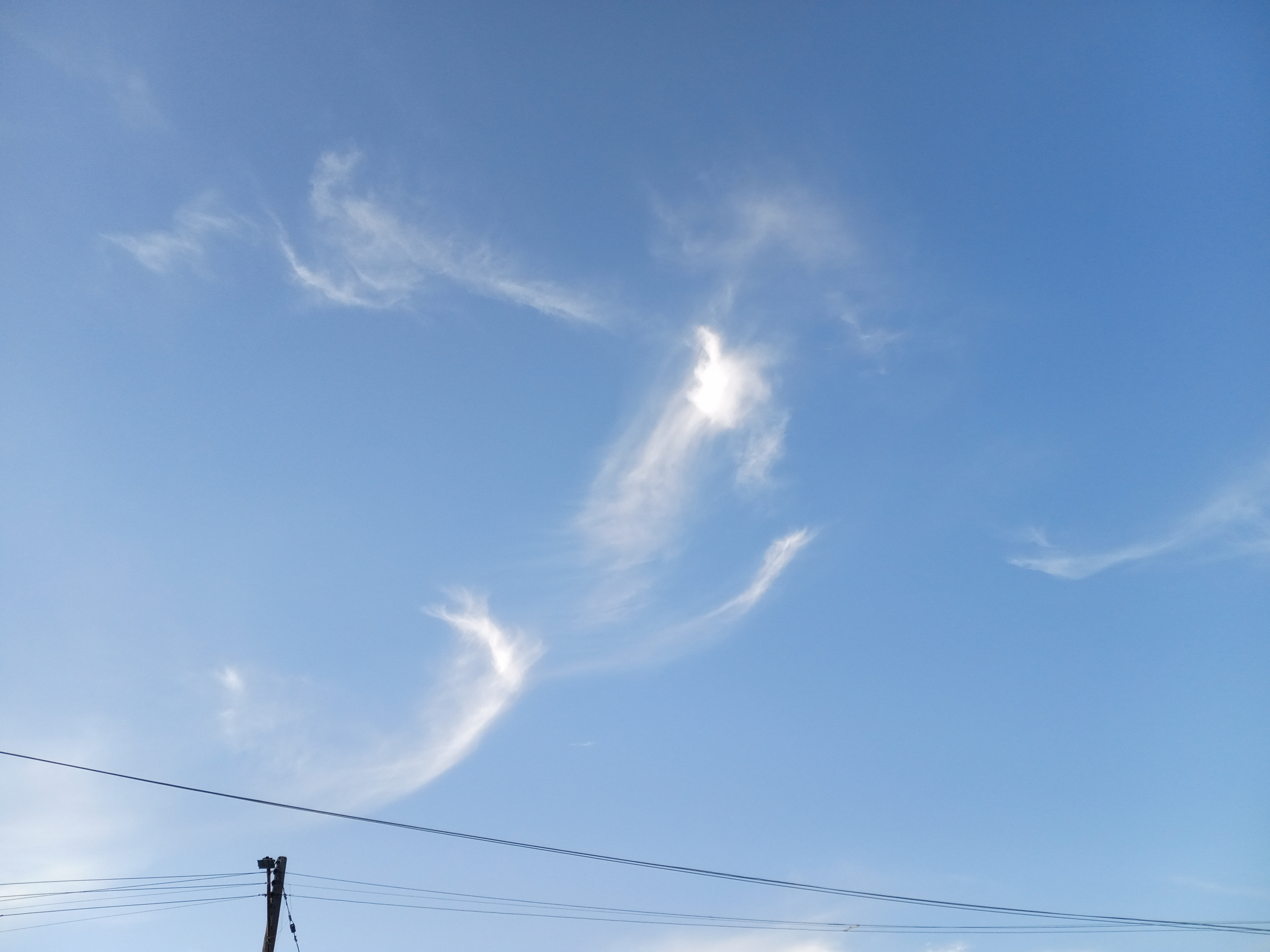
Cirrus uncinus clouds over Salinas Victoria, Nuevo León, Mexico

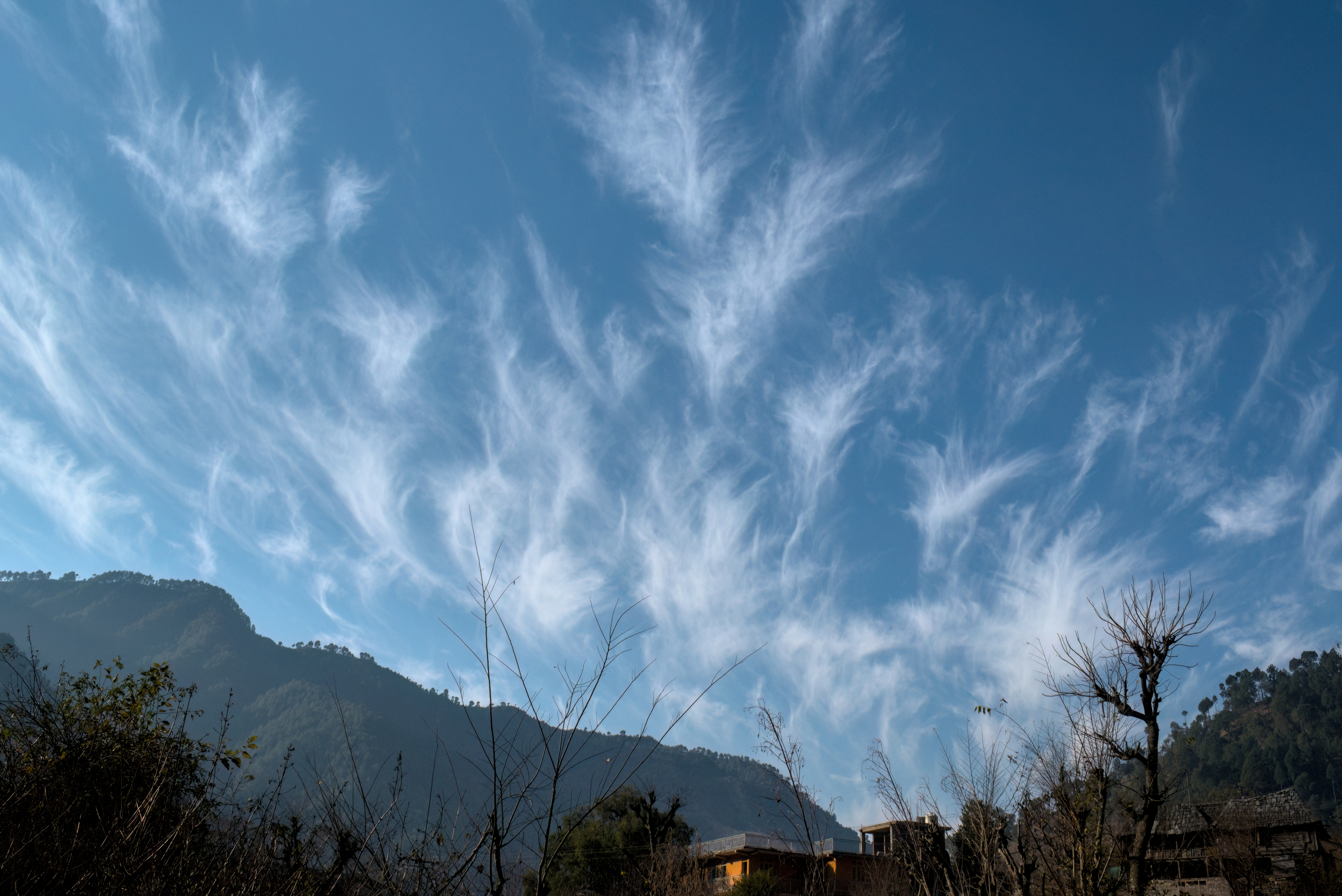
Cirrus uncinus clouds in the morning sky over Nandli, Himachal Pradesh, India

== See also ==
- List of cloud types
