= Glossary of meteorology =

This glossary of meteorology is a list of terms and concepts relevant to meteorology and atmospheric science, their sub-disciplines, and related fields.

== 0–9 ==
2 meter temperature

The air temperature at a height of 2 metres (6.6 ft) above the ground surface, usually calculated by interpolation rather than directly observed.

== A ==
advection
The horizontal transport of some property of the atmosphere or ocean, such as thermal energy, humidity, or salinity. In the context of meteorology, the related term convection generally refers to vertical transport.
actinoform

Describing a collection of low-lying, radially structured clouds with distinct shapes (resembling leaves or wheels in satellite imagery), and typically organized in extensive mesoscale fields over marine environments. They are closely related to and sometimes considered a variant of stratocumulus clouds.
actinometer
A scientific instrument used to measure the heating power of radiation, particularly solar radiation.
active surface
That part of the Earth's surface which is in direct contact with the atmosphere and which undergoes the greatest diurnal temperature changes, absorbing heat during the day and radiating it to the atmosphere at night. Examples include bare soil, the canopy of a forest, and the uppermost surface waters of the ocean.
adiabat
A line drawn on a thermodynamic diagram along which an air parcel moves as it ascends or descends through the atmosphere, cooling or warming adiabatically; the path followed by this line depends on whether it is a dry adiabat or a saturated adiabat.
adiabatic cooling
An adiabatic process of expansional cooling, in which a rising air parcel decreases in temperature as it increases in volume.
adiabatic heating

An adiabatic process of compressional warming, in which a sinking air parcel increases in temperature as it decreases in volume.
adiabatic lapse rate
The rate at which a parcel of air changes temperature adiabatically as it moves vertically through the atmosphere. The parcel's moisture content affects this rate: as it rises, a parcel saturated with moisture cools more slowly than a dry parcel because the release of latent heat at the phase change between gas and liquid acts to buffer the temperature decrease caused by the adiabatic expansion. When not otherwise qualified, the term most often refers to the dry adiabatic lapse rate.
adiabatic process
Any idealized hypothetical process by which energy is transferred between a thermodynamic system and its surroundings only as work, without a corresponding transfer of heat or mass. Most compressible fluids, including gases in the atmosphere, behave approximately adiabatically, such that meteorologists often use the assumption of adiabatic isolation when describing atmospheric systems. In such systems the temperature of a dry parcel of air changes without any exchange of energy with its surroundings: as the parcel rises, the decrease in the surrounding atmospheric pressure enables the air in the parcel to expand in volume, which decreases its internal energy and therefore its temperature (expansional cooling); as the parcel sinks and is compressed, its temperature increases (compressional warming).
aerobiology
The branch of biology that studies airborne organic particles, such as bacteria, viruses, fungal spores, pollen grains, and very small insects, which are passively transported by the air.
aerography
The production of weather charts.
aerology
See atmospheric science.
aeronomy
The branch of meteorology that studies the upper regions of the Earth's or other planetary atmospheres, specifically their atmospheric motions, chemical compositions and properties, and interactions with the other parts of the atmosphere and with space.
aerosol
A suspension of fine solid particles or liquid droplets in air or another gas. Examples of natural aerosols include mist, clouds, fog, and dust.
ageostrophy
air current
Any concentrated area of winds that develops because of differences in pressure and/or temperature between adjacent air parcels. They are generally divided into horizontal and vertical currents and exist at a variety of scales and in various layers of the atmosphere.
air mass
A volume of air defined by its temperature and moisture content.
air parcel
In fluid dynamics, any amount of air that remains identifiable throughout its dynamic history while moving with an associated air flow.
air-mass thunderstorm
Any thunderstorm that is generally weak and usually not severe. Such storms move relatively slowly, are short-lived, and often exist only as single cells (rather than in long continuous lines or complexes), but may still produce lightning and heavy rainfall. They derive their energy from solar radiation and commonly develop in temperate zones during summer afternoons.
Alberta clipper

A fast-moving low-pressure system commonly developing during the winter months immediately east of the Canadian Rockies, usually in or near the province of Alberta, and tracking east-southeast through southern Canada and the northern United States, often bringing small-scale, short-lived winter storms with sharp winds, cold temperatures, and snowfall to the Upper Midwest, the Great Lakes, and the Northeast.
almanac
An annual publication of calendar events.
aloft
Located in the atmosphere at some height (often significantly high) above the Earth's surface. The term is typically used to distinguish an upper-air observation from a surface weather observation, as in "winds aloft".
altimeter
A scientific instrument used to measure the altitude of an object (e.g. a weather balloon) with respect to a fixed level such as sea level.
altocumulus castellanus
altocumulus (Ac)
A middle-altitude cloud genus characterized by small globular masses, laminae, or rolls, white or grey in color, arranged in patches or extensive sheets at altitudes between 2 and 7 kilometres (6,600 and 23,000 ft), with the individual elements being larger and more distinct than in cirrocumulus but smaller than in stratocumulus. Like other stratocumuliform clouds, altocumulus usually signifies convection aloft. It is one of several classic "warning clouds" recorded by the aviation industry as a signal of developing thunderstorms.
altostratus (As)
A cloud genus occurring at middle altitudes as a grey or bluish-grey sheet, appearing either completely uniform or fibrous and striated, and sometimes thin enough for the disk of the Sun to be visible through it. Altostratus frequently produces precipitation, though it may not reach the ground.
American Meteorological Society (AMS)
A scientific and professional organization in the United States whose mission is to promote and disseminate information about the atmospheric, oceanic, and hydrologic sciences, and advance technologies, applications, and services related to them.
anabatic wind
A wind that blows upslope from the low elevations of a valley to the higher elevations of surrounding hills or mountains as the result of daytime surface heating in the valley, usually at speeds of 12 knots (22 km/h; 14 mph) or less but occasionally at much higher speeds. Contrast katabatic wind.
anemometer
A scientific instrument used to measure wind speed.
annular tropical cyclone
anticyclone
Any large-scale air mass characterized by outward spiraling winds which circulate around a strong center of high atmospheric pressure. Surface-based anticyclones generally bring about cool, dry air and clear skies and are often implicated in weather phenomena such as fog and haze. Contrast cyclone.
anticyclonic rotation
anticyclonic storm
Any storm system involving an anticyclone, in which winds circulate around a region of high pressure in the direction opposite to that expected around a region of low pressure. Anticyclonic storms rotate clockwise in the Northern Hemisphere and counterclockwise in the Southern Hemisphere.
anticyclonic tornado
anticyclogenesis
The development or strengthening of an anticyclonic circulation in the atmosphere, which may result in the formation or maintenance of a high-pressure area. Contrast cyclogenesis.
antitriptic wind
A wind generated by the local topography of a particular place; examples include anabatic winds and katabatic winds. Most such winds are diurnal in character.
anvil
The distinctive uppermost part of some mature cumulonimbus clouds, which has fanned out into a flat, spreading formation at very high altitudes, causing the cloud as a whole to appear anvil-shaped. These formations are reliable indicators of strong convective updrafts and thus commonly associated with thunderstorms. The anvil formation itself often spreads great horizontal distances from the rest of the cloud and may be visible dozens or hundreds of kilometers from the cloud base, even when the base itself is not visible.
apparent temperature
See heat index.
arcus cloud
Arctic cyclone
Atlantic hurricane
A tropical cyclone (locally known as a hurricane) that forms in the Atlantic Ocean and achieves one-minute maximum sustained winds exceeding 74 mph (119 km/h; 64 kn). Most of these storms occur between June 1 and November 30 each year, a time period referred to as the Atlantic hurricane season.
atmometer
See evaporimeter.
atmosphere
The various layers of gases surrounding the Earth and held in place by gravity. The Earth's atmosphere is the origin of the weather phenomena studied in meteorology. Atmospheric composition, temperature, and pressure vary across a series of distinct sublayers including the troposphere and stratosphere.

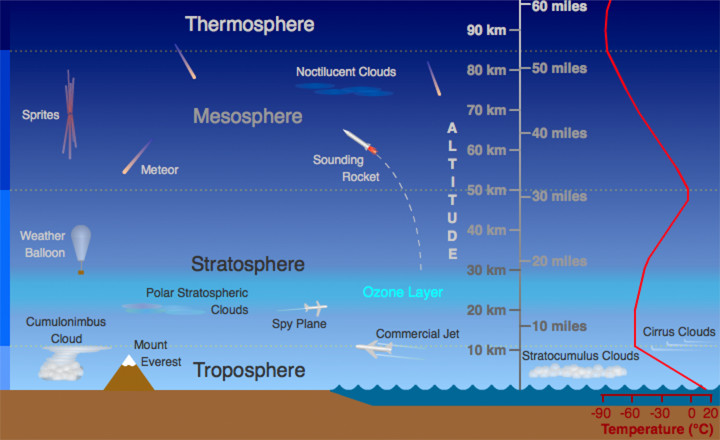
The properties of Earth's atmosphere vary by altitude across a series of distinct layers.

atmospheric boundary layer (ABL)
See planetary boundary layer.
atmospheric circulation
The global-scale movement of air masses within the Earth's atmosphere. All meteorological phenomena are consequences of the atmospheric circulation, which manifests as a network of both latitudinal and longitudinal "cells" of convective activity; together with ocean circulation, these cells are the primary means by which thermal energy from the Sun is distributed across the Earth's surface.
atmospheric convection
atmospheric density (ρ)
The density (mass per unit volume) of the Earth's atmosphere. Atmospheric density generally decreases proportionally with elevation above sea level, and also tends to vary with changes in atmospheric pressure, temperature, and humidity. According to the International Standard Atmosphere, at a pressure of 1 atm and a temperature of 15° C, air has a density of approximately 1.225 kilograms per cubic metre (kg/m^{3}), about 1/1000 the density of liquid water.
atmospheric lake
A long-lived pool of water vapor.
atmospheric model
atmospheric pressure (p)

The pressure exerted by the Earth's atmosphere. In most circumstances atmospheric pressure is closely approximated by the hydrostatic pressure caused by the weight of the air above the measurement point, and therefore decreases proportionally as altitude increases. The average atmospheric pressure at sea level on Earth is equal to approximately 1 standard atmosphere (atm), which is defined as exactly 101,325 pascals (760 mmHg).
atmospheric river
atmospheric science

The collective of scientific disciplines that studies the Earth's atmosphere and its processes, including the effects other systems have on the atmosphere and those the atmosphere has on other systems. Meteorology and climatology are sub-disciplines.
atmospheric sounding
A measurement of the vertical distribution of physical properties through an atmospheric column, usually including pressure, temperature, wind speed and direction, moisture content, ozone concentration, and pollution, among others.
atmospheric temperature
A measure of temperature at one or more locations within the Earth's atmosphere. Temperatures recorded in the atmosphere can vary widely with altitude, humidity, and solar irradiance, among other factors.
atmospheric thermodynamics
atmospheric tide
A global-scale periodic oscillation of the Earth's atmosphere caused by gravitational and thermal influences from the Sun and the Moon, analogous to oceanic tides.
atmospheric window
Any of the ranges of small bandwidths in the electromagnetic spectrum at which the Earth's atmosphere is nearly transparent, i.e. where absorption by atmospheric gases is nearly zero and transmittance approaches unity both for incoming and outgoing radiation. Examples include the optical window from ~0.3 to 0.9 μm, the infrared window from ~8 to 13 μm, and the microwave window at wavelengths longer than ~1 mm. The existence of these windows is vital for the Earth–atmosphere system to be maintained near thermal equilibrium.
autumn
avalanche
Aviation Area Forecast (FA or ARFOR)

A former message product of the U.S. National Weather Service issued to provide information to pilots and aviation routes about weather conditions across a large regional area within the United States. FAs were issued three times daily, valid for 18 hours, and covered an area the size of several states. They were replaced by Graphic Area Forecasts (GFAs) in 2017.

== B ==
backing
A change of wind direction in a counterclockwise fashion (e.g. northerly to northwesterly to westerly). Contrast veering.
backscatter
The diffuse reflection of waves, particles, or signals back to the same direction from which they originated. Backscattering is the principle underlying all weather radar systems, which can distinguish radar returns backscattered from target aerosols such as raindrops and snowflakes because the strength of the returns depends largely on the size and reflectivity of the targets.
ball lightning
banana belt
Any segment of a larger geographic region that typically experiences warmer temperatures than the region as a whole, especially during the local winter season, which may prove favorable for agriculture.
barbs
barograph
A scientific instrument used to measure and continuously record changes in atmospheric pressure over time.
baroclinity

A measure of the misalignment between a pressure gradient and a density gradient in a stratified fluid such as the atmosphere. In the context of meteorology, a baroclinic atmosphere is one in which atmospheric density depends on both temperature and pressure, in contrast to a barotropic atmosphere, in which density depends only on pressure. Areas of high atmospheric baroclinity are generally found in the temperate and polar latitudes and are characterized by the frequent formation of cyclones.
barotropity

The close alignment between a pressure gradient and a density gradient in a stratified fluid such as the atmosphere. In the context of meteorology, a barotropic atmosphere is one in which atmospheric density depends only on pressure and is more or less independent of temperature, in contrast to a baroclinic atmosphere. Unlike liquids, gaseous fluids such as the air in the atmosphere are generally not barotropic, but the assumption of barotropity can nonetheless be useful in modeling fluid behavior. Tropical latitudes are more nearly barotropic than the mid-latitudes because air temperature is more nearly horizontally uniform in the tropics.
barometer
A scientific instrument used to measure atmospheric pressure. The two most common types are mercury barometers and aneroid barometers.
barometric pressure
See atmospheric pressure.
barrier jet
A low-level core of high wind speeds that sometimes occurs at altitudes of 1,000–1,500 metres (3,300–4,900 ft) in the vicinity of a mountain range, as a consequence of the deceleration of an airflow as it crosses a major topographic barrier and releases latent heat which changes the local thermodynamics of the flow.
Beaufort scale
Bernoulli's principle
A principle of fluid dynamics which states that an increase in the speed of a moving fluid occurs simultaneously with a decrease in the pressure exerted by the fluid or in the fluid's potential energy.
Bishop's ring
black ice

A thin, nearly transparent coating of glaze ice on a solid surface, especially a road or walkway, which because of its transparency is often practically invisible and therefore presents a significant hazard to drivers and pedestrians.
blizzard
A severe snowstorm characterized by strong sustained winds of at least 35 mph (56 km/h) and blowing snow, typically lasting three hours or more. They can have an immense size, covering hundreds or thousands of square miles, and occur most often in temperate, polar, or mountainous regions during the winter.
block

A nearly stationary pattern in the atmospheric pressure field overlying a large geographic area, which effectively "blocks" or diverts the movements of cyclones and other convective systems. These blocks can remain in place for days or weeks, causing the areas affected by them to experience the same kind of weather for extended periods of time.
blowing dust
A lithometeor phenomenon that occurs when particles of dust are lifted from the Earth's surface by wind and blown about in clouds or sheets. It is classified as an obstruction to vision in METAR aviation weather observations and is commonly reported if the amount of suspended dust reduces horizontal visibility to 10 kilometres (6 mi) or less. Extreme cases may be called dust storms.
blowing sand
A lithometeor phenomenon that occurs when grains of sand are lifted from the Earth's surface by wind and blown about in clouds or sheets. It is classified as an obstruction to vision in METAR aviation weather observations and is commonly reported if the amount of suspended sand reduces horizontal visibility to 10 kilometres (6 mi) or less. Extreme cases may be called sandstorms.
blowing snow
Snow blown about by wind, either from falling snow or snow lifted from the surface, to a height of at least 2 metres (6.6 ft), reducing visibility. It is a defining characteristic of blizzards.
bounded weak echo region (BWER)
bow echo
A characteristic radar return from a mesoscale convective system that is shaped like an archer's bow and usually associated with squall lines or lines of convective thunderstorms. The distinct bow shape is a result of the focusing of a strong flow at the rear of the system. Especially strong bow echoes may develop into derechos.

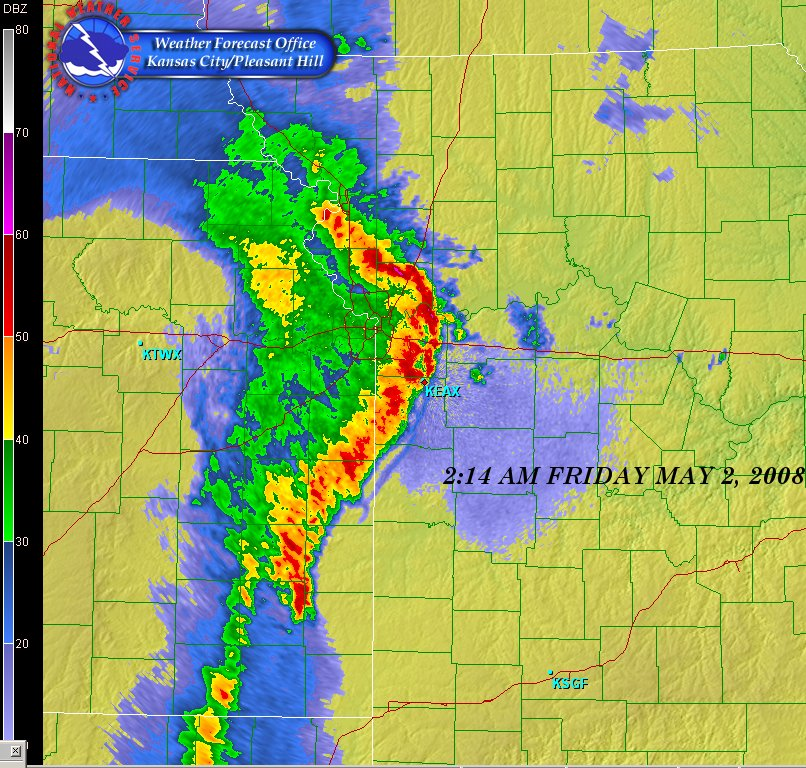
A radar image showing a distinct bow echo in a line of thunderstorms over Kansas City, Missouri

breeze
1. Any generally light wind.
2. Any local-scale air movement that is convectively forced, e.g. a land breeze or sea breeze.
3. On the Beaufort scale, a wind speed of force numbers 2 to 6, ranging from 4–27 knots (7–50 km/h; 5–31 mph), and categorized as follows: light breeze, 4–6 knots; gentle breeze, 7–10 knots; moderate breeze, 11–16 knots; fresh breeze, 17–21 knots; and strong breeze, 22–27 knots.
brightband
Bulk Richardson Number (BRN)
A dimensionless ratio related to the consumption of turbulence divided by the shear production of turbulence (the generation of kinetic energy caused by wind shear). It is an approximation of the Gradient Richardson Number.
bushfire
See wildfire.
Buys Ballot's law
A meteorological heuristic derived from the general observation that, in the Northern Hemisphere, if an observer stands with their back to the wind (i.e. facing the direction toward which the wind is blowing), atmospheric pressure is lower on the observer's left and higher on the observer's right. This is because air moves counterclockwise around low-pressure centers in the Northern Hemisphere, a consequence of the Coriolis force; the phenomenon is reversed in the Southern Hemisphere. The rule holds approximately true at high latitudes, where the angle between the wind direction and the pressure gradient force is generally nearly perpendicular, but is less reliable or even absent at low latitudes.

== C ==
calm
A state of the atmosphere in which there is virtually no horizontal motion of the air. It corresponds to force number 0 on the Beaufort scale, with a wind speed less than 1 kn (1.9 km/h). Calm conditions are common in the subtropical high-pressure belts and in the doldrums.
Canadian Meteorological and Oceanographic Society (CMOS)
The national society of individuals and organizations dedicated to advancing atmospheric and oceanic sciences and related environmental disciplines in Canada, officially constituted in 1967.
Canadian Meteorological Centre (CMC)
Provides forecast guidance to national and regional prediction centres in Canada.
Canterbury arch
See Nor'west arch.
cap cloud

An approximately stationary cloud on or hovering above an isolated mountain peak. See also pileus and lenticular cloud.
capacity
The ability of a wind current to transport material, as measured by the maximum amount of detritus (e.g. silt, sand, and/or gravel) carried past a specific point per unit time. Capacity increases with wind speed and decreases as the particle size of the detrital debris increases.
capping inversion
castellanus

A cloud species that displays at least in its upper part cumuliform protuberances resembling the turrets of a castle, giving a crenellated aspect.
catabatic wind
See katabatic wind.
ceiling
A measure of the height above the Earth's surface of the base of the lowest layer of clouds or obscuring phenomena that covers more than half of the sky (more than four oktas). An "unlimited" ceiling means either that the sky is mostly free of cloud cover or that the clouds are sufficiently high so as not to impede aircraft operation by visual flight rules.
ceiling balloon

A type of weather balloon used by meteorologists to determine the height of the cloud base above ground level during daylight hours by measuring the time it takes for the balloon, released from the ground and rising at a known rate of ascent, to begin to disappear into the clouds.
ceiling projector
A type of cloud-height indicator that uses a searchlight to project a beam of light vertically onto a cloud base (similar to a ceilometer), with the height of the illuminated spot then calculated by the observer using a clinometer or alidade.
ceilometer
An instrument that uses a laser transmitter or other light source and a collocated receiver to determine the height of a cloud ceiling or cloud base overhead, or to measure the concentration of aerosols within the atmosphere.
cell
1. Any atmospheric circulation feature that is more or less closed, occurring at any of number of scales, including massive latitudinally oriented circulations such as Hadley cells; mesoscale motions that characterize cellular convection and cause the formation of cellular clouds; and storm cells formed by updraft and/or downdraft loops within a thunderstorm.
2. In weather radar, a local maximum in radar reflectivity that undergoes a life cycle of growth and decay, and which often displays an identifiable structure in radar returns. Cells in ordinary convective thunderstorms typically last 20 to 30 minutes, but may form longer-lasting multicell storms or supercells.
cellular cloud
A mesoscale organization of convective activity in the form of a quasi-regular pattern of clouds behaving as individual convective cells, often stretching horizontally for tens of kilometers. Such patterns may be composed of open or closed cells or both: the open cells consisting of a ring of cumulus with a clear center, and the closed cells filled with stratocumulus surrounded by a clear rim.
Center for Analysis and Prediction of Storms (CAPS)
Develops techniques for computer-based prediction of high-impact local weather, such as individual spring and winter storms, using Doppler weather radar and other sources. Based in Oklahoma, United States.
central dense overcast (CDO)
The large, centralized, contiguous area of thunderstorms surrounding the rotational center of a strong tropical or subtropical cyclone. When a cyclone reaches sufficient intensity, a distinguishable eye may develop within the CDO. The strongest winds and heaviest rainfall are usually found beneath the coldest cloud tops in the CDO.
central pressure
The atmospheric pressure at the center of a recognizable high or low-pressure area at any given instant, i.e. the highest pressure in a high or the lowest pressure in a low.
ceraunometer
An instrument used for counting the number of lightning discharges within a specific radius.
chinook wind
A warm, dry föhn wind formed by a rainstorm dropping its precipitation onto the windward side of a mountain, thus drying the air mass before it blows across the leeward side, drops in elevation, and warms by adiabatic heating. Common in the northwestern United States and southwestern Canada, a chinook can cause temperatures to rise from −48 °C (−54.4 °F) to 9 °C (48.2 °F) in 24 hours, an increase of 57 °C (103 °F).
circulation
Common short form of atmospheric circulation.
cirrocumulus (Cc)
A genus of cloud with both stratiform and cumuliform characteristics, signifying atmospheric convection, and appearing as white, patchy, transient sheets of ripples or tufts organized in undulating rows, usually between 5 and 12 km (16,000 and 39,000 ft) above sea level. Though composed mainly of ice crystals, cirrocumulus is distinguished from cirrus and cirrostratus by the presence of small amounts of supercooled liquid water droplets.
cirrostratus
cirrus (Ci)
A genus of cloud characterized by thin, wispy, feather-like strands that appear white or light grey in color and form at very high altitudes, usually between 5 and 13.7 km (16,000 and 45,000 ft) above sea level. Cirrus clouds often develop from the outflow of cumulonimbus clouds in advance of fronts or thunderstorms, and therefore may indicate the imminent arrival of precipitation.
clear ice
A type of solid precipitation which forms when relatively large drops of water are supercooled into a dense, transparent coating of ice without air or other impurities. It is similar to glaze and hard rime and, when formed on the ground, is often called black ice.
clear-air turbulence
climate
The statistics of weather in a given region over long periods of time, measured by assessing long-term patterns of variation in temperature, atmospheric pressure, humidity, wind, precipitation, and other meteorological variables. The climate of a particular location is generated by the interactions of the atmosphere, hydrosphere, cryosphere, lithosphere, and biosphere and strongly influenced by latitude, altitude, and local topography. Climates are often classified according to the averages or typical ranges of different variables, most commonly temperature and precipitation.
climatology

A branch of the atmospheric sciences that studies climate, defined as weather conditions averaged over an extended to indefinite period of time. Climatology incorporates aspects of oceanography, geology, biogeochemistry, and the related field of meteorology to understand the long-term dynamics of climate-influencing phenomena and to produce climate models which can be used to estimate past climates and predict future climates.
cloud
An aerosol consisting of a visible mass of minute liquid droplets, frozen crystals or other particles suspended in the atmosphere. Water or various other chemicals may compose the droplets and crystals. On Earth, clouds are formed as a result of the saturation of an air mass when it is cooled to its dew point or when it gains sufficient moisture (usually in the form of water vapor) from an adjacent source to raise the dew point to the ambient temperature. There are many different types of clouds, which are classified and named according to their shape and altitude.
cloud atlas
A pictorial key to the classification and nomenclature of clouds.
cloud base
The lowest altitude of the visible portion of a cloud.
cloud bow
See fogbow.
cloud cover
The obscuration of all or part of the sky by clouds as observed from a particular location, or the specific fraction of the sky obscured by clouds as measured in oktas.
cloud drop effective radius
cloud genus
See cloud type.
cloud iridescence

A type of photometeor consisting of colorful iridescent patterns appearing most commonly near the semi-transparent edges of thin clouds such as cirrus and altocumulus that are in the general proximity of the Sun or Moon. They are caused by the diffraction of sunlight or moonlight by thin, uniform layers of very small water droplets or ice crystals.
cloud species
Any of a set of 14 Latin terms used to describe the shape and internal structure of tropospheric clouds. Cloud species are subdivisions of cloud genera and are themselves further subdivided into cloud varieties.
cloud tag
cloud type

Any of a set of Latin names used to classify and identify clouds occurring in the troposphere, typically by characteristics such as their altitude, shape, and convective activity. A set of 10 or 12 traditional cloud types defined by the World Meteorological Organization and further subdivided into cloud species and cloud varieties is widely used in meteorology. Other classification systems have proposed many additional types.
cloud variety
cloudburst
A colloquial term used to describe an excessive precipitation event, characterized by brief, sudden, exceptionally heavy rain and/or hail falling from a cloud, typically as part of a thunderstorm associated with violent upward and downward convective currents.
col

The point of intersection of a trough and a ridge in the pressure pattern of a weather map. It generally takes the shape of a saddle in which the air pressure is slightly higher than that within the low-pressure regions but still lower than that within the anticyclonic zones.
cold front
A type of front located at the leading edge of a cooler air mass as it replaces a warmer air mass. Cold fronts lie within a sharp surface trough of low pressure and the temperature difference between the air masses they separate can exceed 30 °C (86 °F). When enough moisture or instability is present, lines of rain or thunderstorms may accompany the boundary as it moves. In surface weather analysis, cold fronts are symbolized by a blue line with triangles pointing in the direction of travel.
cold wave

A period of weather characterized by excessively low temperatures, which may or may not also be accompanied by changes in humidity. Very cold weather is often only referred to as a cold wave if the temperature, or the rate at which the temperature decreases within a given time period, is abnormal relative to the typical climate for a given location during a given season. Contrast heat wave.
cold-core low
Colorado low
A type of low-pressure area that forms in southeastern Colorado or northeastern New Mexico, in the United States, and then proceeds to move east across the Great Plains, often producing heavy snow and ice when occurring in the winter.
convection
See atmospheric convection.
convective available potential energy (CAPE)
A measure of the maximum kinetic energy per unit mass that a rising air parcel could hypothetically acquire by remaining warmer and less dense than the surrounding air; more specifically, the integrated amount of work that the upward buoyancy force would perform on a given mass of air if it rose vertically through the entire atmosphere, typically expressed in Joules per kilogram (J/kg). CAPE exists so long as a given air parcel can ascend and still remain warmer than the surrounding air. This is possible if the parcel is moist, because water vapor releases heat as it condenses, which can slow the parcel's rate of cooling and thus keep it warmer than surrounding air up to some definite height. The repeated ascent of relatively warm and moist air can stimulate the formation of cumulus or cumulonimbus clouds and drive the development of thunderstorms. CAPE is thus commonly interpreted as the capacity of the atmosphere to support the vertical movement of air (i.e. atmospheric convection), as an indicator of convective instability, or as a rough measure of the likelihood or potential intensity of storms. Values of CAPE in environments conducive to severe thunderstorms are commonly in the thousands of Joules per kilogram.
convective condensation level
convective inhibition (CIN)
convective instability
The inability of an air mass to resist vertical motion. In a stable atmosphere vertical movement of air is generally difficult, whereas in an unstable atmosphere vertical disturbances can be quite exaggerated, resulting in turbulent airflow and convective activity that may lead to extensive vertical clouds, storms, and severe weather.
convective outlooks
convective storm detection
convergence
A pattern of fluid flow that brings about a net inflow of fluid elements into a region, in either the atmosphere or the ocean, accompanied by compensating vertical motion. When convergence occurs in the lower atmosphere, generally below about 550 hectopascals (0.54 atm), the compensatory air motion is upward, with inflow gradually changing to outflow at higher altitudes; when it occurs in the upper atmosphere, the air motion is downward, with divergence near the surface.
convergence zone
corona
An optical phenomenon consisting of apparent concentric, pastel-colored rings around a bright celestial object (such as the Sun or the Moon), which are produced by the diffraction of light by individual water droplets or sometimes small ice crystals in a cloud or on a foggy glass surface. Coronae differ from halos in that the latter are formed by refraction from comparatively large particles.
crepuscular rays
crosswind
Any wind that moves in a direction that is perpendicular to the direction of travel of a reference object, such as an airplane.
Crow instability

An inviscid line-vortex instability most commonly observed in the skies behind large aircraft such as the Boeing 747. It occurs when the wingtip vortices interact with contrails from the engines, producing characteristic visual distortions in the shapes of the contrails.
cumuliform
Of or relating to heaped, "puffy" clouds, such as cumulus or cumulonimbus, that form as a result of atmospheric convection.
cumulonimbus
cumulus (Cu)
A genus of cloud characterized by low-level "puffy" or "cotton-like" forms with flat bases (generally opaque white in color but sometimes with grey undersides), which occur individually or multiply in a variety of distinct subforms, usually at altitudes less than 2 km (6,600 ft) above sea level. Cumulus clouds normally produce little or no precipitation, but can develop into precipitation-bearing clouds such as cumulonimbus when influenced by atmospheric instability, moisture, and temperature gradients.
cumulus congestus
cumulus humilis
cumulus mediocris
cyclone
Any large-scale air mass characterized by inward spiraling winds which circulate around a strong center of low atmospheric pressure. Cyclones can form over land or water, can vary in size from mesocyclones such as tornadoes to synoptic-scale phenomena such as tropical cyclones and polar vortices, and may transition between tropical, subtropical, and extratropical phases. Contrast anticyclone.

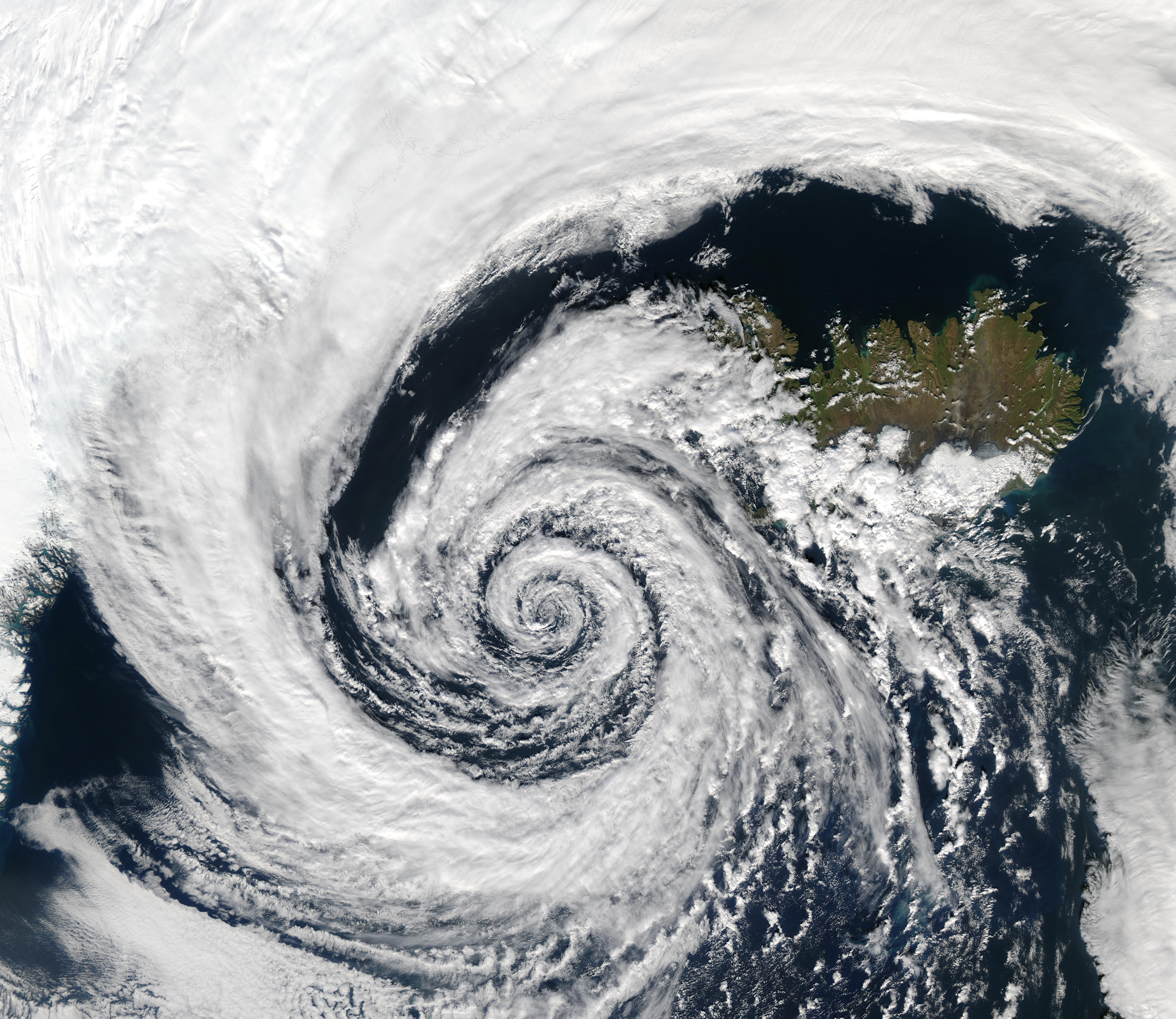
Very large air masses (and the clouds within them) spiral counterclockwise around a strong center of low atmospheric pressure in this extratropical cyclone over Iceland

cyclonic rotation
cyclogenesis
The development or strengthening of a cyclonic circulation in the atmosphere. Cyclogenesis may refer to a number of different processes that occur under a variety of conditions and at a variety of scales, all of which result in the formation of some sort of cyclone; for instance, tornadoes are a type of mesocyclone whose development may be variously described as cyclogenesis or, more specifically, tornadogenesis. Contrast anticyclogenesis.

== D ==
dark adaptor goggles

A type of specialized eyewear used by meteorologists and astronomers for adapting the eyes to the dark prior to an observation made at night, or for aiding with identification of clouds during bright sunshine or when there is a glare from snow.
dawn

The first appearance of sunlight in the eastern sky before sunrise, or the time that marks the beginning of the morning twilight.
daytime
The period of the day between sunrise and sunset, during which any given point on the Earth experiences natural illumination from especially direct sunlight, known as daylight.
dBZ
Abbreviation of decibel relative to Z
debris cloud
See tornado debris signature.
deepening
A decrease in the central and surrounding sea-level pressure within the circulation of a pressure system (usually a low-pressure system) over a short period of time, with the result that mass is exported from the total air column overlying the system faster than it is supplied. Deepening of a low is commonly accompanied by the intensification of its cyclonic circulation and hence its winds, and the term is frequently used to imply cyclogenesis. Contrast filling.
deflation
The removal of snow, dust, sand, or other loose material from a surface by the action of the wind.
deformation
The rate of change of shape of a fluid body such as an air mass. This quantity is very important in the formation of atmospheric fronts, in the explanation of cloud shapes, and in the diffusion of materials and properties through the atmosphere.
degree-day
A measure of the difference between the mean daily temperature and a specified reference temperature for a given day. For a specified period, e.g. a month or a year, the number of degree-days is the sum of all degree-days within that period.
dense fog
An advisory issued by the U.S. National Weather Service to caution the public about the possibility that horizontal visibility may be reduced by dense fog to 0.25 miles (0.40 km) or less.
depression
Any area of low atmospheric pressure at a given level in the atmosphere; i.e. a "low" or trough. The term is used especially frequently to refer to an early stage in the development of a tropical cyclone during which the disturbance is only weakly developed or poorly organized; see tropical depression.
derecho
A type of storm that produces widespread, straight-lined sustained winds that are associated with severe thunderstorms.
dew
Liquid water droplets that commonly appear on thin, exposed surfaces in the morning or evening due to the condensation of atmospheric moisture on radiatively cooled surfaces. When temperatures are low enough, the water droplets freeze into ice particles known as frost.
dew point (T_{d})

The temperature to which an air parcel must be cooled, at constant pressure and moisture content, in order for saturation to occur. Continued cooling below the dew point will cause condensation of water droplets if atmospheric conditions are favorable. Dew point is often used as a proxy by which to indicate the moisture content of the air.
dew point depression (T–T_{d})
The difference between the actual temperature and the dew point at a certain altitude in the atmosphere. A small dew point depression indicates more moisture and higher relative humidity, which in the lower troposphere can result in low cloud bases and lifted condensation levels, which are important factors contributing to the development of severe thunderstorms.
diabatic process

Any thermodynamic process in which the temperature of an air parcel changes as a result of the transfer of energy (e.g. heat) between the parcel and its surroundings, as opposed to an adiabatic process, in which the temperature changes without any such exchange. Most thermodynamic processes near the Earth's surface are diabatic, owing to the continual mixing of air and turbulence.
Diablo wind
diamond dust
A ground-level cloud composed of tiny ice crystals. Because it generally forms in sub-freezing temperatures beneath otherwise clear or nearly clear skies, diamond dust is sometimes referred to as clear-sky precipitation.
diffluence
The elongation of a fluid body, such as an air mass, normal to the flow (streamline divergence). It is a flow pattern of deformation.
diffuse sky radiation

The component of incoming solar radiation that is scattered from the direct solar beam by molecules of air, aerosols, clouds, or particulate matter in the atmosphere and subsequently reaches the Earth's surface in nearly equal amounts from nearly all parts of the sky during daylight.
direct circulation
A closed, vertically distributed thermal circulation in the atmosphere, in which warm, lighter air rises and cold, denser air sinks (or, equivalently, a system in which the rising motion occurs at a higher potential temperature than the sinking motion). Such a cell converts heat energy to potential energy and then to kinetic energy. Contrast indirect circulation.
discontinuity
A horizontal zone across which temperature, humidity, wind speed, or any other meteorological variable changes abruptly, such as a front.
disdrometer
A scientific instrument used to measure the size distribution and velocity of falling hydrometeors such as raindrops.
diurnal
Occurring or varying in the course of a solar day (i.e. daily; completed within and recurring every 24 hours), or during the local daytime.
diurnal variation

The range between the maximum and minimum values of a meteorological quantity (e.g. temperature, pressure, relative humidity) observed during the course of a solar day.
Dobson unit (DU)
A unit of measurement used to describe the quantity of a trace gas (primarily atmospheric ozone concentrations) present in a vertical column of the atmosphere. It is defined as the thickness (in units equivalent to 10 μm) of the layer of pure gas which would be formed if all of the gas molecules in the column could be collected on the surface at standard temperature and pressure.
doldrums
See Intertropical Convergence Zone.
Doppler on Wheels (DOW)
Doppler weather radar
downburst
A surface-level wind system that emanates from an elevated point source and blows radially in all directions upon making contact with the ground. Downbursts are created when rain-cooled air descends rapidly, and can produce very strong damaging winds. They are often confused with tornadoes, although a tornado causes air to move inward and upward whereas a downburst directs it downward and outward. Microbursts, macrobursts, and heat bursts are all types of downburst.
downdraft
drifting snow
Particles of snow lifted by the wind to a modest height, generally less than 1.8 metres (6 ft) above the ground. Drifting snow does not significantly reduce visibility at eye level below 10 kilometres (6.2 mi), in contrast to blowing snow.
drizzle
A type of light precipitation consisting of liquid water droplets which are smaller than ordinary raindrops, generally less than 0.05 millimetres (0.002 in) in diameter and falling at a rate of less than 1 millimetre (0.04 in) per day.
drought

Any prolonged period of below-average precipitation in a given region that results in shortages in the local water supply, whether of atmospheric, surface water, or ground water. Droughts can last for months or even years, and may be declared after as few as 15 days; annual or seasonal decreases in precipitation, such as dry seasons in the tropics, are sometimes called droughts, though a true drought is by definition abnormal or irregular. Drought conditions result from the confluence of a wide variety of climatic factors and may be exacerbated by hot temperatures; in turn, droughts may increase the likelihood of wildfires.
dry lightning
Lightning associated with a dry thunderstorm.
dry line

A synoptic-scale boundary between moist air and dry air, generally subtler than a true front but still inherently unstable, because humid air is less dense than dry air at the same temperature and pressure. The term often refers in particular to the transient line running approximately north–south through the Great Plains of central North America, where warm, moist air from the Gulf of Mexico meets dry air from the western United States, though dry lines also occur on other continents. The North American dry line regularly advances eastward during the daytime and retreats westward at night as changes in temperature affect surface-level mixing of the air masses. Convective activity commonly develops along dry lines, generally on the moist side; in the spring and summer, the dry line plays an important role in the development of severe thunderstorms and tornadoes over the central United States.
dry microburst
dry punch
Meteorological slang for a synoptic-scale or mesoscale weather process. A dry punch that occurs near the Earth's surface may result in a dry line bulge, whereas a dry punch aloft may increase the potential for severe thunderstorms.
dry season
An annual period of relatively low or infrequent precipitation, during which weather patterns are typically dominated by lengthy periods of high atmospheric pressure, high temperatures, and low humidity. The term is primarily used in the tropics, in contrast to the wet season.
dry thunderstorm

A thunderstorm that produces thunder and lightning but in which most or all of its precipitation evaporates before reaching the ground. Dry thunderstorms occur necessarily in dry conditions, and their lightning strikes, sometimes referred to as dry lightning, are a major cause of wildfires.
dual polarization weather radar
dusk
dust devil
dust storm

A meteorological phenomenon characterized by very strong winds that blow dust-filled air over an extensive area. Dust storms arise when a gust front or other strong wind blows loose dirt, sand, and/or small rocks from a dry surface into the atmosphere, drastically reducing visibility. Though the term is sometimes restricted to storms occurring over normally arable land suffering from drought, it is also used interchangeably with sandstorm and haboob.

== E ==
echo
On a radar display, the appearance of the radio signal that is scattered or reflected back from a target. The distinct characteristics of a radar echo can be used to identify the distance and velocity of the target with respect to the signal source as well as the target's size, shape, and composition.
eddy
The swirling motion of a fluid and the reverse current created when the flow regime experiences turbulence, such as when an obstacle blocks part of the path of flow.
Ekman layer
The layer in a fluid in which there is a force balance between the pressure-gradient force, the Coriolis force, and turbulent drag. Ekman layers occur in both the atmosphere and the ocean.
Ekman number
Ekman spiral
Ekman transport
energy-helicity index (EHI)
El Niño
The warm phase of the El Niño–Southern Oscillation (ENSO), associated with the annual development of a band of warm ocean water in the eastern equatorial Pacific, which brings low pressure and heavy rainfall to the coasts of Central and South America. The El Niño phase of the cycle may last between two and seven years, with local weather patterns recurring every year. The cool phase of the ENSO is called La Niña.
El Niño–Southern Oscillation (ENSO)
An irregular long-term periodic variation in winds and sea surface temperatures over the tropical eastern Pacific Ocean which affects the climate of most of the world but especially the tropics and subtropics in a cycle lasting years or decades. The phenomenon, a consequence of the Walker circulation, is marked by two phases: a warming phase, El Niño, during which sea temperatures are above average over a large part of the eastern Pacific Ocean, driving high pressure and dry weather in Asia and low pressure and heavy precipitation in the Americas; and a cooling phase, La Niña, during which sea temperatures are below average in the eastern Pacific and the reverse weather pattern occurs. Each phase can last for several years, with local seasonal weather patterns recurring predictably, though there are also long intervals of "neutral" or average conditions when neither El Niño nor La Niña is active.
electrometeor
Any visible or audible indicator of atmospheric electricity, including all types of lightning discharges, thunder, and aurorae.
emagram
One of four thermodynamic diagrams used to display temperature lapse rate and moisture content profiles in the atmosphere. Emagrams have axes of temperature (T) and pressure (p). Temperature and dew point data from radiosondes are plotted on these diagrams to allow calculations of convective stability or convective available potential energy.
Enhanced Fujita scale (EF scale)
ensemble forecasting
A weather forecasting technique in which a numerical weather model generates a set of multiple (often several dozen) forecasts, each based on a slightly different set of initial atmospheric conditions, intended to provide an indication of the range of possible future states of the atmosphere. If the forecasts are consistent, they are usually considered reliable; if they diverge, meteorologists may feel less confident in making specific predictions for the forecast area.
entrainment
The process by which the air surrounding a developing cloud is mixed into an ascending convection current within the cloud, which has the effect of reducing the current's buoyancy. If very dry air is introduced, evaporation of the cloud droplets may cause the cloud system to dissipate completely.
Environment and Climate Change Canada
environmental lapse rate (ELR)
The actual rate at which atmospheric temperature changes with altitude, as measured by a radiosonde; this is in contrast to the rate predicted by the theoretical process lapse rate. On average, the temperature of the troposphere decreases with height at a rate of 6.5 °C (11.7 °F) per kilometre, but this rate is influenced by many factors. In general, the ELR is lower nearer to the ground surface, during the local winter, and over continental landmasses.
Environmental Modeling Center (EMC)
Environmental Science Services Administration (ESSA)
The predecessor agency (1965–1970) to the National Oceanic and Atmospheric Administration (1970–present).
equivalent potential temperature ($\theta_e$)
equivalent temperature ($T_e$)
The temperature obtained when an air parcel expands adiabatically, at constant pressure, until its water vapor content has been condensed out and the latent heat of condensation is available to raise the air temperature.
Eulerian equations
European windstorm
evaporimeter

An instrument used to measure the rate of evaporation of water into the atmosphere. The most basic design consists of an open, ground-level evaporation pan from which water is allowed to evaporate freely.
explosive cyclogenesis
extratropical cyclone

Any synoptic-scale cyclonic circulation that occurs outside of the tropics, i.e. in the middle or high latitudes, circulating around a central low-pressure area in the same manner as a tropical cyclone but developed and sustained by different mechanisms. Extratropical cyclones and anticyclones drive much of the weather in the Earth's temperate and subpolar zones and may produce a wide variety of conditions, ranging from cloudiness and mild showers to severe thunderstorms, hail, tornadoes, and blizzards. Unlike tropical cyclones, they generally result from the interaction of two air masses with different properties, producing rapid changes in temperature and dew point along an extensive front at the boundary between the air masses, which wraps around the center of the cyclone.
extreme weather
Any weather that is unexpected, unusual, unpredictable, unseasonal, or especially severe (i.e. weather at the extremes of an historical distribution).
eye
A typically circular region at the center of a strong tropical cyclone that is the location of the storm's lowest barometric pressure. The eye is usually characterized by light winds, clear skies, and mostly calm weather, in stark contrast to the severe weather that occurs in the surrounding eyewall and the rest of the storm.
eye of the wind
A nautical term used to describe the direction from which the wind is blowing.
eyewall

The sharply defined inner edge of the ring of cumulonimbus clouds surrounding the eye of a cyclone, where the storm's most intense convective activity and strongest updrafts typically occur, and therefore usually also the heaviest precipitation, highest sustained wind speeds, and most violent thunderstorms. See also wall cloud.

== F ==
fall wind
See katabatic wind.
Fata Morgana
fetch

The length of water over which a given wind blows. Fetch length and wind speed together determine the size of the waves that form on the surface of a body of water; the longer the fetch and the stronger the wind, the more wind energy is imparted to the water surface and the larger the resulting sea state.
field mill
A scientific instrument used to measure the strength of electric fields in the atmosphere.
fire whirl

A whirlwind induced by a fire and often at least partially composed of flame or ash. They are usually associated with very large wildfires. Fire whirls are seldom classified as true tornadoes, as their vorticity usually derives from turbulent surface winds and heat-induced lifting rather than from a tornadic mesocyclone aloft.
firestorm
A very large wildfire or other conflagration which because of its intensity is able to create and sustain its own storm-force winds. Firestorms develop when a convective updraft of hot air rising from the burning area draws in strong wind gusts from all directions, which supply the fire with additional oxygen and thereby induce further combustion. They are often associated with flammagenitus clouds and fire whirls.
flammagenitus

flash flood
Any flood which very rapidly inundates low-lying areas such as washes, rivers, dry lakes, and basins, especially one which recedes again in less than six hours. Flash flooding can be caused by heavy rain associated with severe weather, large amounts of meltwater from melting ice or snow, or the sudden collapse of a natural ice or debris dam.
flash freezing
The process by which objects such as liquid hydrometeors are cooled below their freezing point very quickly, typically upon being subjected to extremely cold atmospheric temperatures or by making contact with a frozen surface.
flood
An overflow of water which submerges land that is usually dry. Flooding may occur when water bodies such as rivers, lakes, or oceans escape their boundaries by overtopping or puncturing levees, or it may occur when precipitation accumulates on saturated ground more rapidly than it can either infiltrate or run off.
flumen

fog
A visible aerosol of minute water droplets or ice crystals that is suspended in the air at or near the Earth's surface. Fog is often considered a type of low-lying cloud and is heavily influenced by local topography, nearby bodies of water, and wind conditions.
fogbow

An optical phenomenon in which a whitish or faintly colored primary rainbow, often with red and blue edges, is visible on a background of fog or mist at the observer's anti-solar point. It is caused by the refraction, reflection, and diffraction of light from the Sun or Moon by small water droplets with diameters less than 100 micrometres (0.004 in).
föhn wind

A type of warm, dry, downslope wind that occurs in the lee of a mountain range.

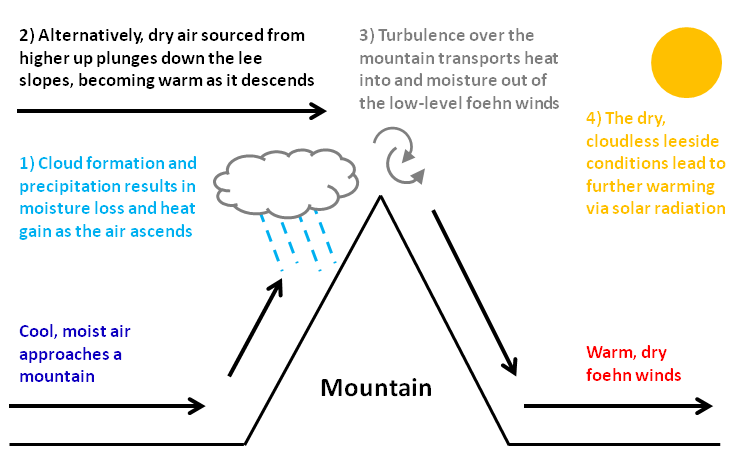
Föhn winds form when cool, moist air passing over a mountain loses moisture and gains heat, becoming warm, dry air that blows back down the mountain's leeward slope.

forward-flank downdraft (FFD)

fractus (Fr)

A cloud type or species consisting of ragged, irregularly shaped patches or shreds of cumulus or stratus.
frazil ice
Tiny clusters of ice crystals that form seasonally in supercooled waters in rivers, lakes, and oceans, or wherever conditions are made favorable by vertical mixing or turbulence such as that caused by waves and currents, which prevents the crystals from freezing into sheet ice. It is common in the polar regions, often forming on the downwind side of leads and in polynyas, and in certain conditions may take on an oily or "greasy" appearance.
free atmosphere
The upper levels of the atmosphere, beyond the planetary boundary layer, where the effects of surface heating and friction may be assumed to be absent. It thus approximately corresponds to that part of the atmosphere that is above the altitude at which the wind becomes geostrophic.
freezing drizzle
A type of precipitation in which drizzle consisting of supercooled liquid water droplets, often falling through a temperature inversion in the lower atmosphere, freezes upon impact with the ground or other cold surfaces to form a coat of glaze ice. Compare freezing rain.
freezing fog
A condition in which supercooled water droplets comprising fog freeze, either while suspended in the air, filling the air with visible ice crystals similar to very light snow, or upon contact with sub-freezing surfaces, forming a coating of rime and/or glaze ice.
freezing rain
Liquid droplets of rain that become supercooled while falling through a sub-freezing air mass and then freeze upon impact with any surface they encounter; the resulting glaze ice can accumulate to a thickness of several centimeters. Unlike mixed rain and snow, ice pellets, and hail, freezing rain exists entirely as a liquid until it hits a surface.
freshet
1. A springtime thaw of snow and ice that produces a significant local inundation of rivers, streams, small watercourses, and floodplains as the snowpack melts within a watershed.
2. Any temporarily inundated or rapidly flowing watercourse or newly created (and often ephemeral) drainage channel resulting from snowmelt.
front
A boundary separating two masses of air of different density and usually also of different temperature and humidity. Weather fronts are the principal cause of meteorological phenomena outside the tropics, often bringing with them clouds, precipitation, and changes in wind speed and direction as they move. Types of fronts include cold fronts, warm fronts, and occluded fronts.
frontal cyclone
See extratropical cyclone.
frontogenesis
The process by which a weather front is created or strengthened, usually as a result of the narrowing of one or more horizontal temperature gradients across the boundary between two adjacent air masses. Contrast frontolysis.
frontolysis
The dissipation or weakening of an atmospheric weather front. Contrast frontogenesis.
frost
A very thin layer of ice crystals on a solid surface, typically restricted to that which forms when water vapor in an atmosphere whose temperature is above freezing comes into contact with a surface whose temperature is below freezing. Frost may exhibit a great variety of forms.
Fujita scale

funnel cloud
A funnel-shaped cloud associated with a rotating column of air and protruding from the base of a parent cloud but not reaching the ground or water surface. Funnel clouds form most frequently in association with supercell thunderstorms and often develop into tornadoes.

== G ==
gale
1. A strong surface wind, typically used as a descriptor in nautical contexts and variously defined based on speed. In the modern Beaufort scale, a gale is any sustained wind of Beaufort number 7 or greater, corresponding to near gale at 28–33 kn (52–61 km/h; 32–38 mph); gale at 34–40 kn (63–74 km/h); strong gale at 41–47 kn (76–87 km/h); and storm at 48–55 kn (89–102 km/h).
2. Any unusually strong wind.
gale warning
gap wind
A local, low-level wind that blows along a valley or through a col between mountains, often at speeds as high as 20–40 knots (37–74 km/h; 23–46 mph).
general circulation

The major circulation cells of the Earth's atmosphere

geopotential height
A measure of the vertical distance or altitude above mean sea level that accounts for variations in gravitational potential as altitude and latitude change. In meteorology and atmospheric science, geopotential height is often used in place of ordinary altitude when calculating the primitive equations in numerical weather prediction and when creating atmospheric models.
geostrophic wind
The theoretical wind that would result from an exact balance between the Coriolis force and the pressure gradient force (known as geostrophic balance). The true wind almost always differs from the geostrophic wind due to the influence of other forces such as friction from the ground.
glaze

A coating of smooth, clear ice, sometimes of considerable thickness, that forms when supercooled water, usually precipitated as freezing rain or freezing drizzle, freezes upon contact with the ground or other exposed surfaces where the temperature (and that of the lower atmosphere) is at or below 0 °C (32 °F). Glaze is denser, harder, and more transparent than rime and hoarfrost.
GPS meteorology
A type of observational meteorology that interprets the effects of atmospheric properties such as total precipitable water vapor on the propagation of Global Positioning System (GPS) radio signals to derive information about the state of the local atmosphere.
graupel

A type of precipitation that forms when supercooled water droplets are collected and freeze on falling snowflakes, forming balls of rime 2–5 mm (0.079–0.197 in) in diameter. Graupel is distinct from hail, small hail, and ice pellets.
Great Salt Lake effect
A lake-effect snow that occurs in the lee of Utah's Great Salt Lake.
grease ice
A stage in the formation of sea or lake ice in which a thin layer of densely clumped frazil ice crystals is prevented from freezing into a solid surface by the motion of the water, which gives the ice a characteristic soupy or "greasy" appearance similar to an oil slick.
green flash
An optical phenomenon consisting of a momentary glimmer of green light occasionally observed near the upper limb of the Sun's apparent disk just as it disappears from view at sunset or just as it appears at sunrise. It is most likely to be seen where there is a low, clear, distant horizon, such as over the ocean.
ground blizzard
A weather condition that occurs when loose snow or ice on the ground is lifted and blown into the air by strong winds. This can create low-visibility conditions even in the absence of precipitation.
ground truth
Information, such as local weather conditions, provided by direct observation (i.e. empirical evidence), as opposed to information provided by inference.
gust
A brief, sudden increase in the speed of the wind, usually lasting less than 20 seconds. Gusts are more transient than squalls and are followed by a lull or slowing of the wind speed. They are generally only reported by weather stations when the maximum wind speed exceeds the average wind speed by at least 10–15 knots (12–17 mph).
gust front
See outflow boundary.
gustnado

A relatively weak tornado associated with the outflow at the leading edge of a thunderstorm cell, and often occurring along a gust front. A debris cloud or dust whirl may indicate the presence of a gustnado.

== H ==
haboob
Hadley cell

hail
A type of solid precipitation that consists of balls or irregular lumps of ice, usually 5–150 mm (0.20–5.91 in) in diameter, each of which is called a hailstone. Hail formation requires environments with strong, upward motion of air and low altitudes at which water freezes, which makes it possible within most thunderstorms. It is distinct from graupel and sleet or ice pellets.

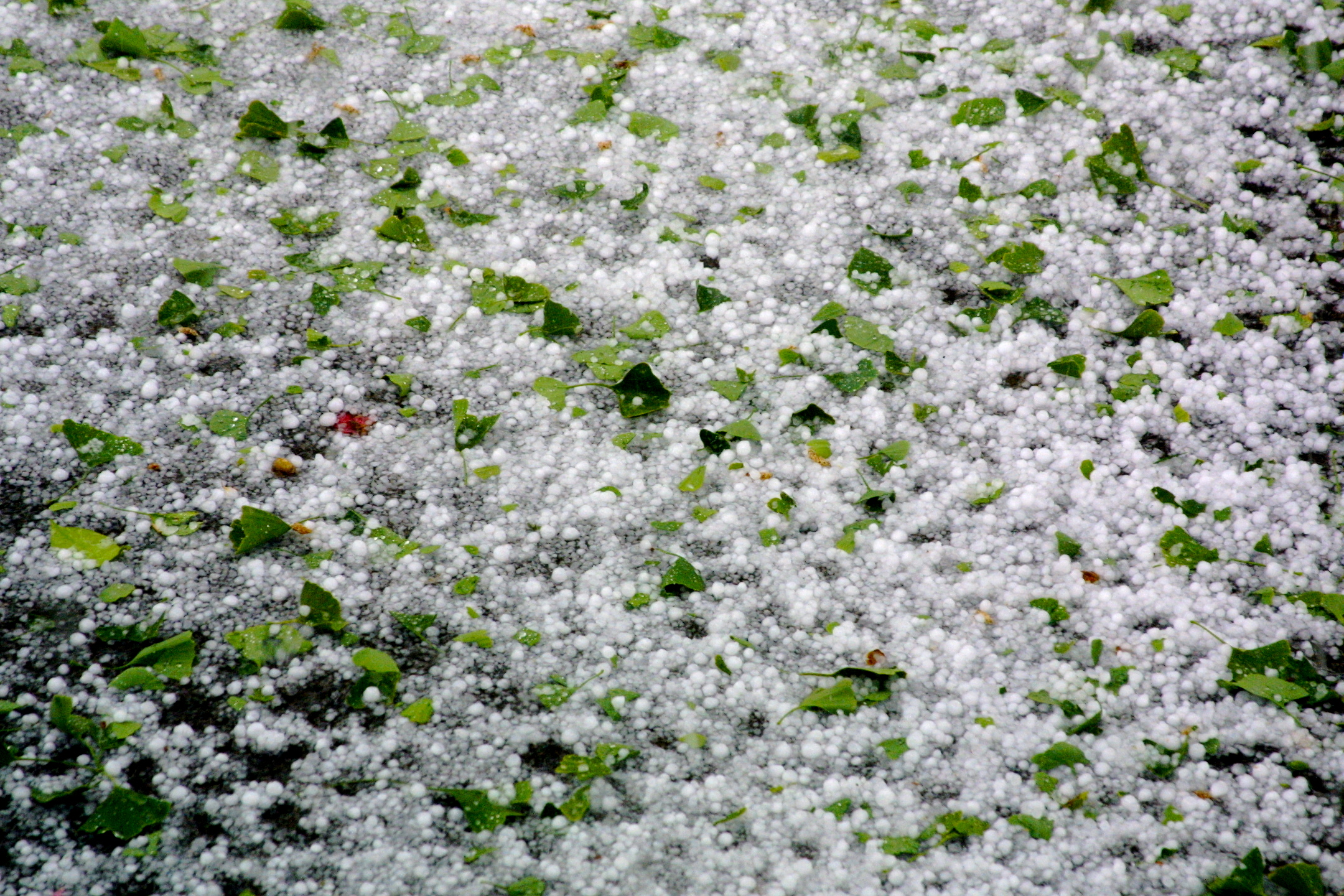
Numerous hailstones accumulated on the ground following a hailstorm

hailstorm
Any storm, usually a strong thunderstorm, which precipitates hail.
Haines Index

A weather index that measures the potential for dry, unstable air to contribute to the development of large or erratic wildland fires. The index derives from data on the stability and moisture content of the lower atmosphere and is calculated over three ranges of atmospheric pressure.
halo
hard rime
A type of rime consisting of opaque, granular masses of ice deposited primarily on vertical surfaces by freezing fog. Hard rime is more compact and amorphous than soft rime and usually develops on windward surfaces exposed to high wind speeds and air temperatures between −2 and −8 °C (28 and 18 °F).
Harmattan
haze
Any suspension in the atmosphere of very small, dry particulate matter, including natural aerosols (e.g. dust, salt, or smoke) as well as man-made pollutants (e.g. smog), the individual particles of which are invisible to the naked eye but collectively produce a milky, often opalescent sky with reduced visibility at long distances. Haze usually indicates sub-saturated air, whereas fog or mist indicates full saturation.
hazardous seas warning
hazardous seas watch
heat dome
The effect created by Earth's atmosphere trapping hot ocean air like a lid or cap.
heat burst
A rare phenomenon involving a sudden, localized increase in surface temperature (sometimes 10 °C (18 °F) or more within just a few minutes) associated with a decaying thunderstorm or other mesoscale convective system and possibly accompanied by gusty winds and a rapid decrease in humidity.
heat index (HI)

A meteorological index that posits the apparent temperature perceived by the average human being who is exposed to a given combination of air temperature and relative humidity in a shaded area. For example, when the air temperature is 32 °C (90 °F) with 70% relative humidity, the heat index is 41 °C (106 °F).
heat lightning
heat wave
A period of weather characterized by excessively high temperatures, which may or may not be accompanied by high humidity or by drought. Very hot weather is often only referred to as a heat wave if the temperature is abnormal relative to the typical climate for a given location during a given season. Contrast cold wave.
heavy snow warning
A type of weather warning formerly issued by the U.S. National Weather Service to alert areas in which a high rate of snowfall (generally 6 in (15 cm) or more in 12 hours) was occurring or was forecast. The warning was replaced by the Winter Storm Warning for Heavy Snow beginning with the 2008–09 winter storm season.
helicity
high-pressure area
hodograph

A vectorial visual representation of the movement of a body or a fluid, with the position of any data plotted on it proportional to the velocity of the moving particle. In the context of meteorology, hodographs are used to plot winds from atmospheric soundings: for a given vector, wind direction is indicated by the angle from the center axis and wind speed by the distance from the center.
hook echo
A characteristic spiral or hook-shaped radar echo associated with some (though not all) tornadoes, usually protruding from the larger echo returned by a multicell or supercell thunderstorm and signifying intense mesocyclonic rotation. Hook echoes are produced by a conspicuous contrast between backscattering from heavy precipitation as it is drawn into a strongly circulating stream of air and the relative lack of scattering in an adjacent circulation of precipitation-free air. These echoes may only last a few minutes, and though they are not infallible indicators of tornadogenesis, they do reveal extreme turbulence.

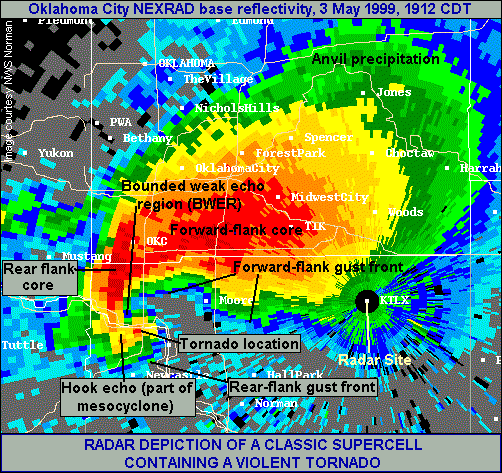
A distinctive hook echo, indicating the presence of a tornado, plus many other features common in supercell thunderstorms are visible in this radar signature.

horseshoe vortex
humidity
A measure of the amount of water vapor present in a parcel of air. By quantifying the saturation of the air with moisture, humidity indicates the likelihood of precipitation, dew, or fog occurring. The amount of water vapor needed to achieve full saturation increases as the air temperature increases. Three primary forms of humidity are widely employed in meteorology: absolute, relative, and specific.
humidex
humilis
See cumulus humilis.
hurricane
The local name for a tropical cyclone that occurs in the Atlantic Ocean or northeastern Pacific Ocean and achieves one-minute maximum sustained winds exceeding 74 mph (119 km/h; 64 kn).
hurricane hunters
huaico

A mudslide or flash flood caused by torrential rainfall occurring high in the Andes mountains of South America, especially during the weather phenomenon known as El Niño.
hydrometeor
Any particulate of liquid or solid water within the atmosphere, encompassing all types of precipitation, formations due to condensation such as clouds and haze, and particles blown from the Earth's surface by wind such as blowing snow and sea spray.
hydrometeorology
A branch of meteorology and hydrology that studies the transfer of water and energy between land surfaces and the lower atmosphere.
hydrosphere
The combined mass of all solid, liquid, and gaseous forms of water found on, beneath, or above the surface of the Earth, including all oceans, lakes, streams, groundwater, atmospheric water vapor, snow, ice caps, and glaciers.
hydrostatic equilibrium
hygrometer
A scientific instrument used to measure humidity.
hygroscopy
The phenomenon by which a substance attracts and retains water molecules via either absorption or adsorption from the surrounding environment.
hypsometer
A scientific instrument used to measure height or elevation, either by trigonometry or by the principle that atmospheric pressure influences the boiling point of liquids.

== I ==
ice
Water frozen into a solid state. Ice is abundant on Earth's surface and in the atmosphere and plays a major role in Earth's water cycle and climate. Its natural occurrence in weather phenomena takes many forms, including snowflakes, hail, frost, icicles, and ice spikes.
iceberg
ice accretion indicator
ice crystal
1. A minute spicule of ice that forms from water in the atmosphere at temperatures below the freezing point of 0 °C (32 °F). Ice crystals may take on any of a number of macroscopic, crystalline forms depending on the temperature at their formation, including needles, hexagonal prisms, and stars. Their growth occurs by the diffusion of water vapor onto them, and they may collide with other ice crystals to form snowflakes.
2. A type of precipitation composed of very small, unbranched crystals of ice which fall slowly and often seem to float in the air.
ice fog
A type of fog consisting of a sufficient concentration of tiny ice crystals suspended in the atmosphere to reduce visibility to less than 1 kilometre (0.62 mi). Ice fog forms at very low ambient air temperatures, typically −30 °C (−22 °F) or below, usually in calm conditions at high latitudes but sometimes also as the result of mild maritime air blowing across ice- or snow-covered surfaces.
ice pellets
ice spike
A rare ice formation that consists of a long, slender projection of ice extending upward from the surface of a frozen body of water, often in the shape of an inverted icicle.
ice storm
A type of winter storm characterized by freezing rain which results in the accumulation of at least 6.4 millimetres (0.25 in) of ice on exposed surfaces.
icicle
A long, slender spike of ice formed when water dripping or falling from an object freezes.

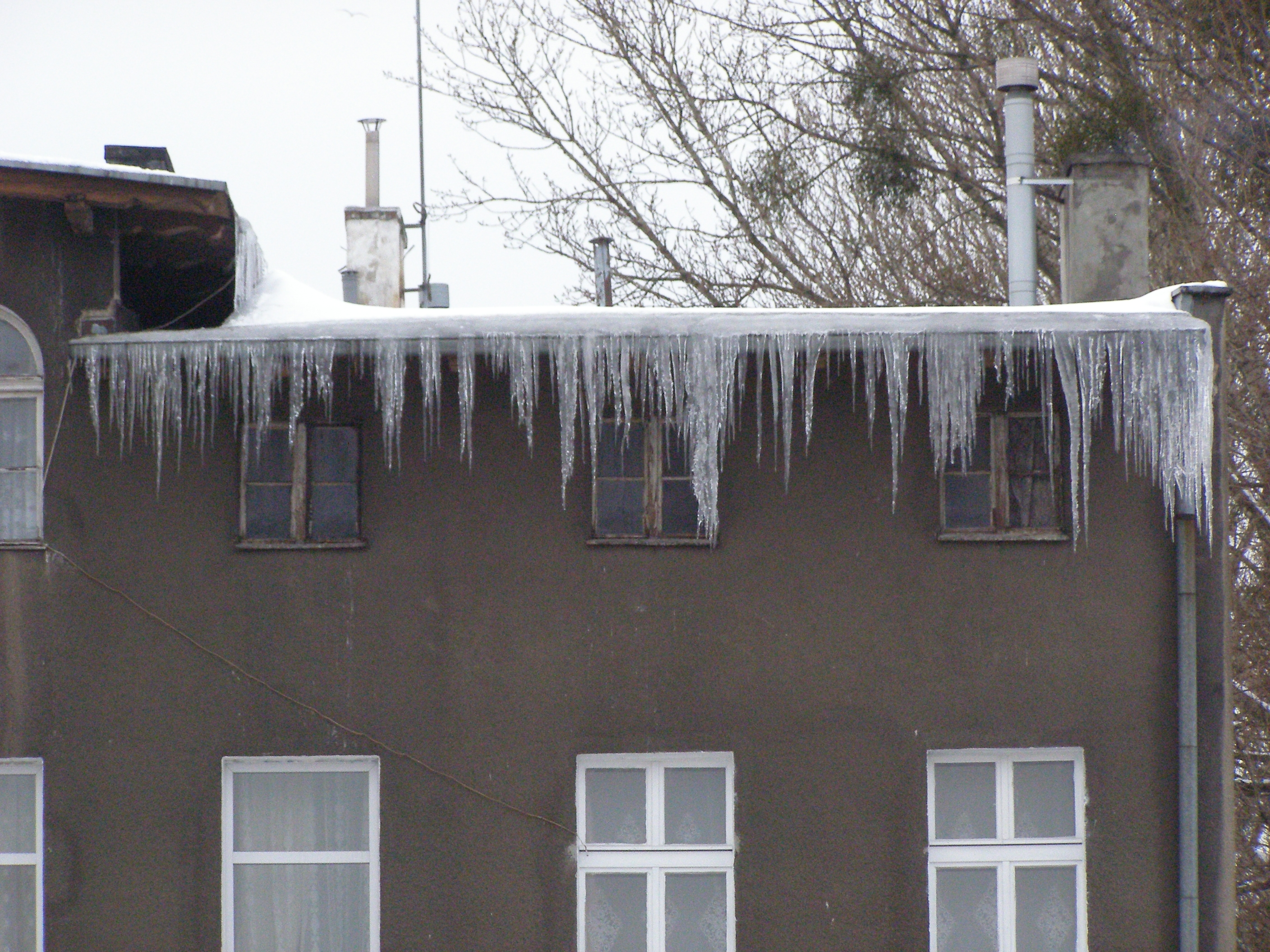
Icicles hanging from the eaves of a building

incus
Indian summer
inflow
The influx of heat and moisture into a storm system from the surrounding environment. The inflow of parcels of warm, moist air drives and sustains most types of storms, including thunderstorms and tropical cyclones. Contrast outflow.
instrument flight rules (IFR)
International Standard Atmosphere (ISA)
A static atmospheric model of the variations in temperature, pressure, density, and viscosity over a wide range of altitudes within the Earth's atmosphere, established as an international standard by the International Organization for Standardization in order to provide a common reference for atmospheric variables relevant to meteorology and atmospheric science.
Intertropical Convergence Zone (ITCZ)

irisation
See cloud iridescence.

== J ==
jet-effect wind
See canyon wind.
jet stream

A narrow, fast-flowing, meandering air current primarily occurring in the upper part of the troposphere, at altitudes above 9 km (30,000 ft), and usually flowing from west to east. The Northern and Southern Hemispheres each have a predictable though discontinuous polar jet and subtropical jet; low-level jets and other types of jet streams can form under certain conditions.
jet streak

The region of maximum wind speed that runs along the elongated axis of a jet stream. In the local winter, the maximum speed in the polar-front jet stream can reach upwards of 200 knots (370 km/h; 230 mph).

== K ==
K-index

An operational atmospheric stability index indicating the potential for thunderstorms, based on temperature lapse rate, moisture content of the lower troposphere, and the vertical extent of the moist layer. K-index values of 36 and above suggest a high likelihood of thunderstorm development.
$K_{DP}$
kata-front
A warm front or cold front that is overrun by drier air, or in which the warm air subsides, so that any clouds and precipitation tend to be suppressed, making them generally inactive fronts. Contrast ana-front.
katabatic wind

A local wind that carries cold, high-density air from a higher elevation downslope under the force of gravity as a result of the radiative cooling of the upland ground surface at night, usually at speeds on the order of 10 kn (19 km/h) or less but occasionally at much higher speeds. Contrast anabatic wind.
Kelvin temperature scale
Kelvin–Helmholtz instability
A phenomenon of instability that occurs occasionally in an atmospheric layer within which wind speed increases rapidly with altitude. Kelvin–Helmholtz waves form in this layer of strong vertical wind shear, and are often marked by a distinct train of clouds that resemble breaking ocean waves.
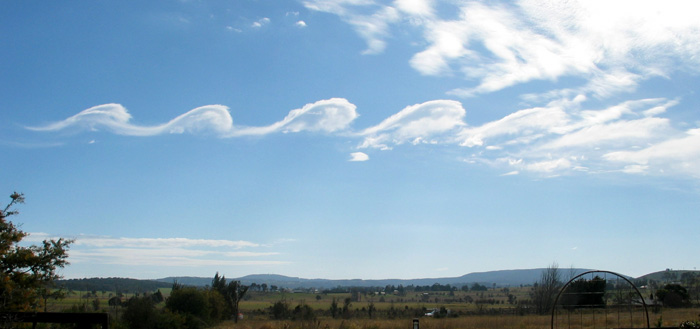
A computer simulation (top) of the development and evolution of the Kelvin–Helmholtz instability, when mixing at the interface between two fluids moving at different velocities creates a distinctive turbulence pattern, and a real-life manifestation in clouds over Australia (bottom)
khamsin

The local name for a dry, hot, seasonal wind, often carrying large quantities of dust or sand, that occurs in the deserts of Egypt, Israel, Palestine, and Jordan. Compare haboob, harmattan, sirocco, and simoom.
kinematics
A branch of classical mechanics that describes the motion of points, bodies, and systems of bodies without considering the forces that caused the motion.
knot (kn)
A unit of speed commonly used in maritime and aviation disciplines, equivalent to one nautical mile per hour (1.1508 miles per hour or 0.5145 metres per second). It is often used in meteorology for measuring wind speed.
Köppen climate classification

== L ==
$L_{DR}$
La Niña
Lagrangian equations
lake-effect snow
A weather phenomenon produced when a cold air mass moves across long expanses of warmer lake water, which causes the lowest layers of air to pick up warm water vapor from the lake, rise through the upper layers, freeze and then precipitate on the lake's leeward shores. In combination with orographic lift, the effect produces narrow but very intense bands of precipitation, especially snow, which can deposit at very high rates and result in very large amounts of snowfall over a region. The same effect can also occur over bodies of salt water, when it is termed ocean-effect or bay-effect snow.
laminar flow
A flow in which the particles of a fluid moves smoothly in parallel layers or sheets, i.e. without turbulence.
land breeze
An offshore local wind that blows from land to sea, usually at night, a result of the more rapid cooling of the land surface relative to the sea after sunset. It blows in the opposite direction of a sea breeze, its daytime counterpart in a diurnal cycle of coastal winds caused by lateral differences in surface temperature between land and sea.
landfall
The movement of a storm or other weather phenomenon over land after being over water.
landslide
landspout
A type of tornado emerging from a parent cloud that does not contain a pre-existing mid-level mesocyclone or other rotation. Landspouts share a development process and resemblance with waterspouts. They are generally smaller and weaker than supercell tornadoes and are rarely detected by Doppler weather radar.
lapse rate
The rate at which an atmospheric variable, most commonly temperature or pressure, decreases with increasing altitude.
latent heat
The amount of heat absorbed or released per unit mass during a change of phase of a substance at constant temperature and pressure. In meteorology, the term usually refers to the amount absorbed or released in the various transformations between the three physical states of water: ice, liquid water, and water vapor. For instance, the latent heat of vaporization requires about 2.4 million Joules per kilogram at 0 °C. Contrast sensible heat.
latent heat flux
The movement of water vapor (a major transporter of latent heat) from one location to another, e.g. from the tropics toward the poles, where there is a persistent energy deficit relative to lower latitudes. Poleward latent heat flux reaches its global maximum of 1.5 × 10^{15} watts at latitudes 38 °N and 40 °S.
law of storms
A general statement of the manner in which the winds of a cyclone rotate about the cyclone's center, and the way in which the entire disturbance moves across the Earth's surface. The development by meteorologists of a "law" describing the general behavior of storms proved important in historical times to sailors navigating during storms at sea.
layer cloud
See stratiform.
lee trough

A trough of low atmospheric pressure that forms preferentially to the lee or downwind side of a mountain barrier when air currents flow in directions perpendicular to the barrier and become vertically "squashed" as they cross it. As the column resumes its original depth on the other side of the barrier, it tends to develop a strong spin about its vertical axis, which manifests as a low-pressure center.
lee wave
Lemon technique
A method used by meteorologists which focuses on updrafts and uses weather radar to determine the relative strength of thunderstorm cells in a vertically sheared environment.
length of record
The time interval during which a particular observation or observations in general have been maintained without interruption at a meteorological station, and which therefore serves as the frame of reference for climatic data at that station.
lenticular cloud
A type of stationary cloud with a distinct lens or saucer shape which typically forms in an arrangement perpendicular to the wind direction and at altitudes less than 12 kilometres (39,000 ft) above sea level, most commonly above or near very large natural obstructions in the atmosphere, such as mountains and hills.
level of free convection (LFC)
The altitude in the atmosphere at which the temperature of the environment decreases faster than the moist adiabatic lapse rate of a saturated air parcel at the same level. Air masses with one or many LFCs are potentially unstable and may develop convective clouds such as cumulonimbus.
Lidar

A surveying method that measures the distance to a target by illuminating the target with pulsed laser light and measuring the reflected pulses with a sensor; differences in laser return times and wavelengths can then be used to create digital three-dimensional representations of the target. The name is now used as an acronym of light detection and ranging.
lifted index (LI)
The difference in temperature between the ambient environment and an air parcel that is lifted adiabatically at a given pressure height within the troposphere, typically 500 hectopascals (0.49 atm). When the value of the lifted index is positive, the atmosphere at the given height is stable; when it is negative, the atmosphere is unstable.
lifting condensation level (LCL)

The altitude to which a parcel of air must be raised or lifted before expansional cooling at the dry adiabatic lapse rate causes it to reach complete saturation (i.e. a relative humidity of 100 percent). If the parcel is lifted further beyond the LCL, water vapor within the parcel will begin to condense into cloud droplets. The LCL is a good approximation of the height of a cloud base when air is lifted mechanically from the surface.
light pillar
lightning
A naturally occurring electrostatic discharge during which two electrically charged regions of the atmosphere or ground temporarily equalize themselves, instantaneously releasing about a billion joules of energy across a wide range of the electromagnetic spectrum, from very hot plasma to brilliant flashes of light visible in the atmosphere. Lightning is often followed by its audible consequence, thunder, and is one of the distinguishing features of thunderstorms. Lightning phenomena are generally separated into three classes based on where they occur – either inside a single cloud, between two different clouds, or between a cloud and the ground – but many other observational variants have been recognized.
lightning activity level
lightning detection
lightning strike
Any lightning discharge that occurs between the atmosphere and an object (rather than between different parts of the atmosphere). Most lightning strikes are cloud-to-ground, meaning they terminate on the Earth's surface or on an object attached to it, but lightning can also strike airborne objects or travel from ground-to-cloud. The primary electron-conducting channel in such discharges, visible for a fraction of a second as a very bright, "zigzagging" path of light, is sometimes called a lightning bolt.

An illustration of how a cloud-to-ground lightning strike occurs when a negatively charged "leader" projecting downward from a cloud meets a positively charged leader projecting upward from the ground

line echo wave pattern (LEWP)
lithometeor

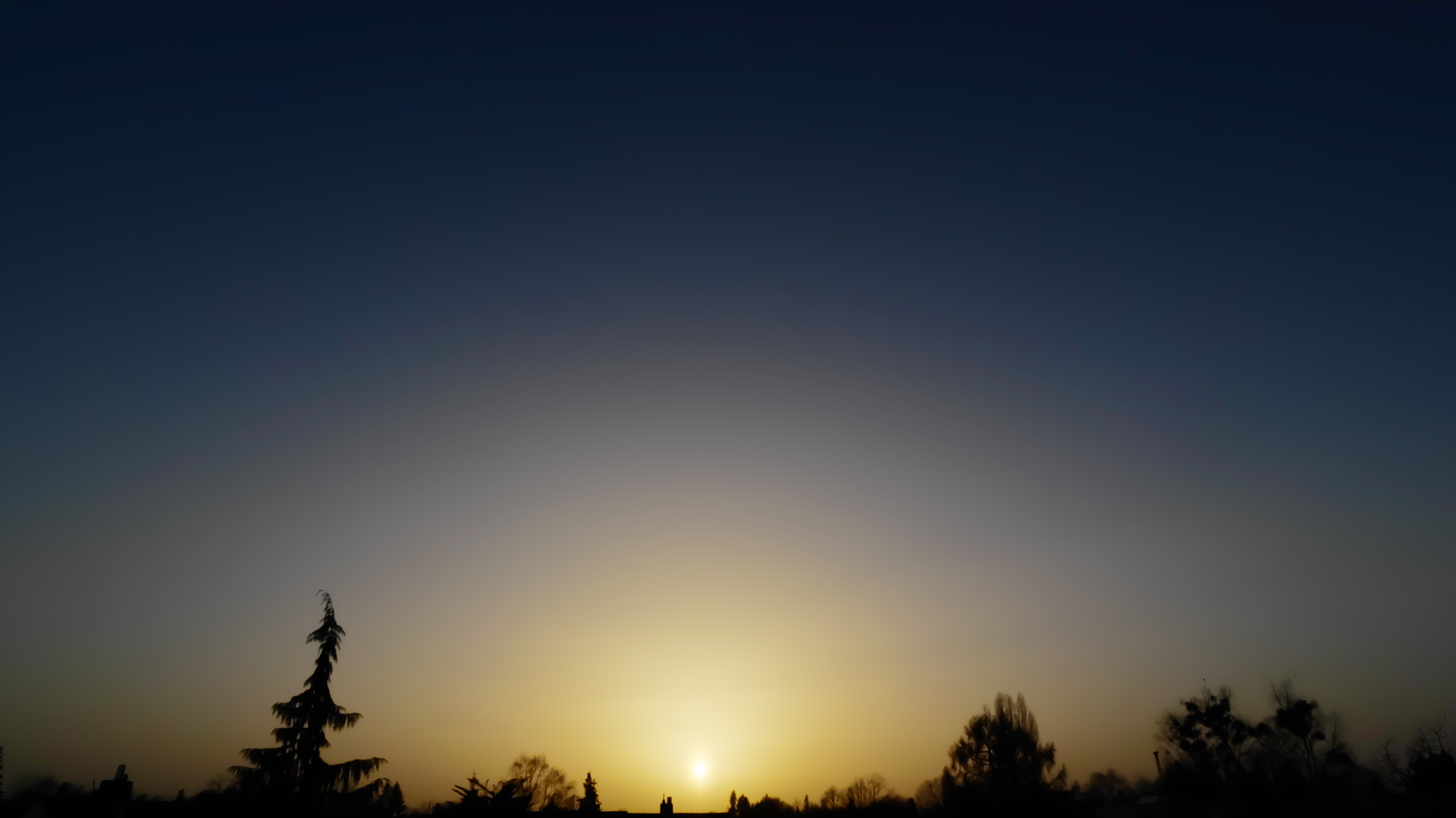
Lithometeor at sunset in Berlin on 25 February 2021, cloudless sky with Saharan Air Layer.

low-level jet
low-level windshear alert system
low-pressure area (L)
low-topped supercell (LT)
lysimeter
An instrument used to measure the total amount of evapotranspiration that occurs within a certain area of the Earth's surface, usually by recording the amount of precipitation received by the area and the amount of moisture subsequently lost through the soil.

== M ==
mackerel sky
A sky that is partially or fully covered by high altocumulus or cirrocumulus clouds with a regular pattern of ripples and patches separated by small areas of blue sky, resembling the scales on a mackerel.
macroburst
A strong downburst that affects a path longer than 4 kilometres (2.5 mi) and persists for up to 30 minutes, with surface winds reaching as high as 210 kilometres per hour (130 mph).
macrometeorology
The study of the largest-scale meteorological processes, i.e. those occurring over very large regions, oceans, continents, or the entire Earth, such as the general circulation, as opposed to mesometeorology and micrometeorology. See also synoptic-scale meteorology.
MAFOR
A North American system used in the transmission of marine weather forecasts to compress large amounts of information about meteorological and marine conditions, including visibility, expected future wind speed and direction, the "state of sea", and the period of validity of the forecast, into shorter code for convenience during radio broadcasting. MAFOR is an abbreviation of MArine FORecast.
manometer
A scientific instrument consisting of a liquid column gauge used to measure differences in the pressures of gases, as with a mercury barometer.
marine climate

A regional climate that is strongly influenced by its location in relation to a sea or ocean, characterized by relatively small diurnal and seasonal temperature variations and high atmospheric moisture content, which contributes to high precipitation and humidity. Contrast continental climate.
marine cloud brightening
marine stratocumulus
mass flow
The movement of a fluid, such as an air mass, down a pressure or temperature gradient.
meridional circulation
The component of the large-scale atmospheric general circulation that is oriented parallel to a meridian or line of longitude, and thus shows large north–south movement.
mesocyclone
mesohigh
mesolow
mesonet
mesoscale convective complex (MCC)
mesoscale convective discussion (MCD)
mesoscale convective system (MCS)
mesoscale convective vortex (MCV)
mesoscale meteorology
mesosphere
The third major layer of the Earth's atmosphere, above the stratosphere and below the thermosphere. The lower boundary of the mesosphere varies between 50 and 65 km (31 and 40 mi) above the Earth's surface, depending on latitude and time of year.
mesovortices
METAR
Météo-France
The national meteorological agency of France.
meteorology
A branch of the atmospheric sciences which seeks to understand and explain observable weather events, with a major focus on weather prediction. Meteorology uses variables familiar in chemistry and physics to describe and quantify meteorological phenomena, including temperature, pressure, water vapor, mass flow, and how these properties interact and change over time.
microburst
micronet
A weather observation network even denser than a mesonet, such as the Oklahoma City Micronet.
microscale meteorology
Meteorological phenomena that occur on a scale of 40 m to 4 km.
mini-supercell
A distinct kind of supercell that is smaller than a typical supercell.
mini-tornado
A fallacious term often used in news media to refer to damaging winds accompanying a thunderstorm, indifferently caused by tornadoes or microbursts, on a small area.
misocyclone
A vortex with a width between 40 metres (130 ft) and 4 kilometres (2.5 mi), which in the strictest sense includes waterspouts and landspouts.
misoscale meteorology
mixed cloud
A cloud composed of both liquid water droplets and ice crystals (e.g. altostratus, cumulonimbus, and nimbostratus), as opposed to a warm cloud.
mixing ratio
A measure of atmospheric moisture content, usually expressed as the dimensionless ratio of the mass of water vapor in a given parcel of air to the unit mass of dry air (i.e. grams of water vapor per kilogram of dry air).
mock sun
See parhelion.
Modified Fujita Scale
An update to the original Fujita scale from 1971 proposed by Ted Fujita in 1992.
moist adiabat
See saturated adiabat.
moist adiabatic lapse rate
See saturated adiabatic lapse rate.
moisture convergence
An area where moisture concentrates due to the air flow near the surface.
mountain breeze
mountain-gap wind
See gap wind.
multicellular thunderstorm
A thunderstorm consisting of more than one convection cell, i.e. more than one circulating system of updrafts and downdrafts.
multiple-vortex tornado
moisture

The presence of liquid, especially water, within a body or substance, often in trace amounts. Moisture in the air in the form of water vapor underlies the concept of humidity.
monsoon
1. An abrupt seasonal wind reversal accompanied by corresponding changes in precipitation.
2. Any seasonal change in atmospheric circulation and precipitation associated with the asymmetric heating of land and sea. In this context, the term is often used to refer specifically to the rainy phase of such a pattern, and in some places colloquially (and less correctly) to any locally very heavy but short-term rainfall.
Morning Glory cloud
mudflow

murus
See wall cloud.

== N ==
nacreous cloud

A rare type of polar stratospheric cloud that forms at altitudes of 24–30 kilometres (79,000–98,000 ft), usually in high-latitude regions. These clouds are normally lenticular in form but may resemble cirrus, and often exhibit brilliant iridescence similar to mother-of-pearl shortly after sunset or before sunrise.
National Center for Atmospheric Research (NCAR)
National Centers for Environmental Prediction (NCEP)
National Hurricane Center (NHC)
National Oceanic and Atmospheric Administration (NOAA)
National Severe Storms Forecast Center (NSSFC)
A predecessor forecasting center to the Storm Prediction Center that was located in Kansas City, Missouri.
National Severe Storms Laboratory (NSSL)
A NOAA lab in Norman, Oklahoma tasked with researching severe weather.
National Tornado Database
The official NOAA record of all known tornadoes within the United States from 1950 to present.
National Weather Center (NWC)
National Weather Service (NWS)
The national meteorological agency of the United States, tasked with providing weather forecasts, warnings of severe weather, and other weather-related services to organizations and the public for the purposes of protection, safety, and general information.
neap tide
A small-amplitude oceanic tide of minimum tidal range occurring semi-monthly near the times when the Moon is in quadrature, i.e. the first and third quarters.
needle ice
negative tilt
The angular displacement of a trough line such that the axis of the trough is rotated clockwise from a north–south meridian (as opposed to the counterclockwise rotation of a positively tilted trough); in the Northern Hemisphere, negative tilt corresponds to a northwest-to-southeast orientation. Most troughs begin with a positive tilt and gradually become neutral (north–south) and then negatively tilted as the flow of cold air distorts their shape. Positive tilt thus indicates the building phase of the trough, when clouds and precipitation develop, and negative tilt indicates the dissipation of its energy, when the most severe weather occurs.
nephelometer

An instrument used to measure the concentration of particulate matter suspended within a liquid or gas by illuminating a sample with a beam of light and then measuring particle density as a function of the amount of light reflected off the particles into a detector; the shape and color of the particles can strongly influence their reflectivity. Nephelometers are commonly used to quantify airborne particulates such as dust, chemical aerosols, and biological contaminants for applications such as air quality monitoring, pollution monitoring, and climatology research.
nephology
The scientific study of clouds.
nephoscope
A scientific instrument used to measure the altitude, direction, and velocity of atmospheric clouds relative to a point on the ground directly below them.
NEXRAD
nimbostratus (Ns)
A genus of cloud occurring at low or middle altitudes, typically between 0.5 and 5.5 kilometres (1,600 and 18,000 ft), and often appearing as a dull, dark gray, ragged, nearly uniform sheet or layer that obscures the Sun and produces more or less continuously falling light to moderate precipitation but no lightning or thunder. Low, ragged fractus clouds frequently occur below nimbostratus and may or may not merge with it.
noctilucent cloud
nonadiabatic process
See diabatic process.
nor'easter

A macro-scale extratropical cyclone, especially one which impacts the middle and north Atlantic coasts of North America. The name derives from the direction of the winds that most strongly affect the eastern seaboard between the months of October and March. Such storms are often accompanied by very heavy rain or snow, which can cause severe coastal flooding, and hurricane-force winds.
Nor'west arch

A conspicuous high-altitude arch-shaped cloud formation that appears regularly in otherwise clear blue skies above the east coast of New Zealand's South Island, when a strong, hot, northwesterly föhn wind (known as "The Nor'wester") pushes cooling moist air over the Southern Alps.
normal
The average value of a meteorological element (e.g. temperature, precipitation, or humidity) over a given period of time, most commonly three consecutive 10-year intervals totaling 30 years.
northern lights
See aurora.
Novaya Zemlya effect
A type of mirage occurring in the polar regions, caused by the abnormal refraction of sunlight between different thermal layers in the atmosphere. The ducting of the light along a temperature inversion for extremely long distances enables an image of the Sun to be visible even when the Sun is actually several degrees below the geometric horizon, often giving the impression that the Sun is rising above the horizon earlier than it should and, depending on weather conditions, sometimes causing it to appear in the shape of a line, rectangle, or hourglass.
nowcasting
numerical weather prediction

== O ==
obscuring phenomena
Any atmospheric phenomenon exclusive of clouds that restricts vertical visibility, including various hydrometeors such as rain and snow as well as lithometeors such as dust and sand.
occluded front
A type of front formed during the process of cyclogenesis when a cold front overtakes a warm front. Occluded fronts usually form around mature low-pressure areas when a warm air mass is physically separated (or "occluded") from the cyclonic center at the Earth's surface by the intervention of a cooler air mass; the warmer air is lifted into a trough of warm air aloft. In surface weather analysis, occluded fronts are symbolized by various combinations of the symbols for cold and warm fronts.
ocean current
Any regular, permanent or semi-permanent movement or flow of ocean water, either in a cyclic pattern or as a continuous stream along a defined path. Ocean currents are generally driven by wind or by geostrophic forces related to seawater density gradients. They are major transporters of the heat introduced by solar radiation, usually moving warm water from the tropics to higher latitudes and returning cold water in the opposite direction, by which they exert an important influence on climate and weather phenomena across the world.
oceanic climate
See marine climate.
offshore current
Any ocean current that flows parallel to, or away from, the coastline of a landmass.
offshore wind
Any wind that blows from land out over a body of water, e.g. a land breeze. Contrast onshore wind.
okta

A unit of measurement used to describe the amount of cloud cover at a given location in terms of how many eighths of the sky are covered in clouds, ranging from 0 oktas (completely clear) to 8 (completely overcast) or sometimes 9 oktas (indicating that the sky is obstructed from view).
omega equation
onshore wind
Any wind that blows from a body of water to land, e.g. a lake or sea breeze. Contrast offshore wind.
opacity
orographic cloud
Any cloud whose form and extent is determined by the effects of high-elevation terrain upon the passing flow of air, especially the forced uplift of moist air as it passes over hills or mountains. As the rising air mass encounters reduced atmospheric pressures, adiabatic cooling commonly results in condensation and precipitation. Orographic clouds are usually very slow-moving or stationary; examples include lenticular clouds and cap clouds.
orographic lift

The forced ascent of an air mass as it passes over a topographic barrier such as a range of hills or mountains. If the air is moist, the uplift may result in adiabatic cooling, leading to saturation, condensation, and the formation of orographic clouds and often precipitation.
orographic precipitation
overcast
The condition of cloud clover wherein clouds obscure at least 95% of the sky. The type of cloud cover that qualifies as overcast is distinguished from obscuring surface-level phenomena such as fog.
overrunning
The action of an air mass aloft, often relatively warm, moving over another air mass of greater density at the surface, as occurs in a warm front.
overshooting top
A distinct, bulging protuberance produced by a vigorous updraft that rises above the top of the anvil of a cumulonimbus cloud. Overshooting tops are generally short-lived, but those that persist may indicate the potential for strong thunderstorms and severe weather.
outflow
Air that flows outwards (away from) a storm system. Outflow typically radiates from thunderstorms in the form of a wedge of rain-cooled air, which is often delineated by a low, thick cloud preceded by a gust front, apparent both from the ground and in weather radar imagery. The altitude at which the outflow occurs is strongly correlated with the intensity and persistence of large storm systems such as tropical cyclones.
outflow boundary

The boundary between the cooled outflow air from a thunderstorm and the air of the surrounding environment, similar to a cold front. New thunderstorms often develop along outflow boundaries.
outflow jet
ozone depletion
The observed decrease in the concentration of ozone (O_{3}) in various layers of the Earth's atmosphere since the 1970s, either overall or as part of a recurring seasonal cycle. Both a long-term secular depletion in ozone levels in the upper atmosphere and an annual decrease in stratospheric and tropospheric ozone above the polar latitudes during the local springtime (forming an "ozone hole") have been attributed primarily to human industrial activities such as the release of volatile halogen-containing pollutants into the atmosphere.
ozone layer

A region of the Earth's atmosphere containing relatively high concentrations of the gaseous chemical ozone (O_{3}) which is responsible for absorbing more than 97 percent of the Sun's incoming medium-frequency ultraviolet (UV) radiation. The ozone layer is found mainly in the lower portion of the stratosphere, between approximately 15 and 35 kilometres (9.3 and 21.7 mi) in altitude, although its thickness varies seasonally and geographically.

== P ==
paleoclimatology
pampero
pan evaporation
pancake ice
A form of ice that consists of round, flat pieces of ice with elevated rims, with diameters ranging from 30 cm (12 in) to 3 m (9.8 ft), and thicknesses of up to 10 cm (3.9 in).
pannus

parhelion

An optical phenomenon in which a patch of bright light is visible along the main 22° halo around the Sun, commonly occurring as a pair of such patches with one on either side of the solar disk; the halo itself is not always visible. More rarely, parhelia may occur at other points on the parhelic circle. They are caused by the refraction of sunlight by airborne ice crystals with diameters less than 30 μm (0.0012 in), e.g. those present in cirrus or cirrostratus clouds.
Particularly Dangerous Situation
pascal (Pa)
The SI derived unit of pressure, defined as one newton per square metre. In meteorology, measurements of atmospheric pressure are often given in hectopascals (hPa) or kilopascals (kPa).
Pascal's law

A hydrostatic principle which states that pressure applied to a confined incompressible fluid (e.g. air) is transmitted equally and undiminished to every portion of the fluid and to the walls of the containing vessel.
Pearson scale

A tornado rating scale developed by Allen Pearson differentiating path length (P) and path width (P) to accompany NOAA Fujita scale (F) ratings.
pedestal cloud
See wall cloud.
pentad
A period of five consecutive days sometimes used in preference to the seven-day week in the analysis of meteorological data because it divides conveniently into the number of days (365) in a standard year.
period of record
The length of time during which a specific meteorological element (e.g. temperature, humidity, precipitation, etc.) has been officially observed and recorded at a particular place.
perlucidus
A cloud variety characterized by a widespread sheet or patch of cloud with distinct gaps between the cloud elements such that the Sun, Moon, clear sky, or overlying clouds are visible from the ground. It is most often applied to stratocumulus and altocumulus.
permafrost
photometeor
Any bright object or other optical phenomenon appearing in the Earth's atmosphere when sunlight or moonlight creates a reflection, refraction, diffraction, or interference under particular circumstances. Common examples of photometeors include halos, coronae, rainbows, crepuscular rays, and sun dogs.
physical meteorology
A branch of meteorology concerned with the structure and composition of the atmosphere and the various optical, electrical, acoustical, and thermodynamic phenomena that characterize it, including aerosols and clouds, precipitation, and electromagnetic radiation.
Phi_DP ($\Phi_{DP}$)
pile d'assiettes
A series of lenticular clouds stacked vertically one above another, produced by wave motion occurring in multiple humid layers of air. The term comes from the French meaning "pile of plates".
pileus

A small accessory cloud, appearing as a smooth, shallow, lenticular "cap", that forms above or attached to the top of a cumulus or cumulonimbus cloud. Pileus clouds are formed when moist air above the parent cloud is cooled to its dew point by a strong updraft, and are good predictors of thunderstorms; a pileus atop a cumulus cloud often foreshadows its transformation into a cumulonimbus cloud.
pilot balloon
See ceiling balloon.
pilot report (PIREP)
An inflight report by an aircraft pilot or crew member of the weather experienced by the aircraft. A complete coded report typically includes information about the location and/or extent of reported weather phenomena; the time of observation; a description of the phenomena; the altitude of the phenomena; and the type or status of the aircraft.
polar high

An extensive high-pressure area across the polar latitudes of either the Northern or Southern Hemisphere which acts as a source of very cold and generally dry air. The anticyclone over the Arctic, known as the Arctic high, is generally seasonal, while that over Antarctica, known as the Antarctic high, is semi-permanent.
polar low

A relatively small-scale, non-frontal, migratory low-pressure system that occurs in the polar latitudes of either the Northern or Southern Hemisphere. Such systems are secondary depressions that form over oceans poleward of the polar front, most commonly during the local winter, and can produce blustery, snowy conditions.
polar front
Either of the two semi-permanent, semi-continuous boundaries separating warm, moist tropical air from cold, dry polar air in the middle latitudes of the Northern and Southern Hemispheres. The northern polar front can often be traced as a continuous line of several thousand kilometers over the North Atlantic and North Pacific Oceans. It is the most significant front in terms of air mass contrast and susceptibility to cyclonic disturbance.
polar mesospheric cloud (PMC)
polar stratospheric cloud (PSC)
polar vortex
Either of the two very large, persistent, rotating, upper-level low-pressure areas suspended in the Earth's atmosphere near the geographic poles. The polar vortices predictably strengthen during their local winter and weaken during their local summer as the temperature contrast between the poles and the Equator changes. When either vortex is weak, high-pressure zones of lower latitudes may push poleward, driving the vortex, jet stream, and masses of cold, dry polar air into the mid-latitudes, which can cause sudden, dramatic drops in temperature known as cold waves.
potential temperature ($\theta$)
potential vorticity
power flash
A sudden bright light caused when an overhead power line is severed or especially when a transformer explodes. Severe weather is one of the most common causes.
precipitable water

The depth of water, in millimeters or inches, that could be measured if all of the water in a column of the atmosphere were precipitated as rain.
precipitation
Any product of the condensation of atmospheric water vapor that falls by gravity, the main forms of which include rain, sleet, snow, hail, and graupel. Precipitation occurs when a portion of the atmosphere becomes locally saturated with water vapor such that the water condenses into liquid or solid droplets and thus "precipitates" out of the atmosphere.
pressure gradient
The horizontal or vertical rate of change of barometric pressure in the atmosphere, usually expressed in hectopascals (hPa) per metre; the term is also sometimes used more loosely to denote simply the magnitude of the gradient within a pressure field. The three-dimensional pressure gradient vector is usually resolved into its vertical and horizontal components.
pressure gradient force (PGF)
The force experienced by a unit mass of air in response to differences in atmospheric pressure in either the horizontal or vertical plane, i.e. a pressure gradient, such that air parcels are accelerated away from regions of high pressure and toward regions of low pressure. A strong pressure gradient force leads to intense atmospheric flows and strong winds.
pressure system
A relative peak or lull in the spatial distribution of sea-level atmospheric pressure. High- and low-pressure systems evolve by the interactions of temperature, moisture, and solar radiation in the atmosphere, and are directly responsible for most local weather phenomena.
prevailing winds
The predominant winds encountered at a particular point or region of the Earth's surface, identified by their source and direction. Though wind speed and direction can vary widely for a given location at a given time, the prevailing winds represent the primary trend in the characteristics of local winds averaged over a long period of time. They are influenced both by global patterns of atmospheric air movements and by local topography.
psychrometer
psychrometrics

The field of engineering concerned with the physical and thermodynamic properties of gas-vapor mixtures, especially the mixture of air and water vapor.
Pulse-Doppler radar
pulse storm
A thunderstorm that produces brief but strong updrafts, common in humid areas of the continental United States during the summer. These storms are often associated with severe weather, particularly sudden and intense wind gusts, very large hailstones which grow continuously as they are repeatedly moved up and down within the storm, and flash flooding.
pyranometer

A type of actinometer used to measure solar irradiance on a planar surface and solar flux density in the hemisphere above.
pyrgeometer
pyrheliometer

== Q ==
Q vector
In quasi-geostrophic and semi-geostrophic theory, a horizontal vector which appears in the omega equation and tends to point in the direction of rising air. If $Q$ points toward warm air, the geostrophic flow is frontogenetic; if it points toward cold air, the geostrophic flow is frontolytic.
quantitative precipitation estimation (QPE)
A method of estimating the approximate amount or rate of precipitation that has fallen at a location or across a region based on radar measurements or satellite data.
quantitative precipitation forecast (QPF)
A prediction of the amount of precipitation that will fall at a given location within a given time period, expressed in units of depth (e.g. inches).
quasi-biennial oscillation (QBO)

A marked oscillation in the zonal winds in the lower part of the equatorial stratosphere, in which the direction changes gradually from westerly to easterly and back to westerly with a period that fluctuates between approximately 24 and 30 months.
quasi-geostrophic approximation

A form of the primitive equations of motion in which the geostrophic wind, an idealized approximation to the actual wind, is used to simplify the system of momentum and thermodynamic equations known as the quasi-geostrophic equations. These equations are derived from an expansion of terms in powers of the Rossby number, which is presumed small. The quasi-geostrophic approximation is useful in the analysis of extratropical synoptic-scale systems, but less accurate in situations in which the ageostrophic wind plays an important advective role, e.g. near fronts.
quasi-geostrophic motion
The flow of a fluid in which an approximate geostrophic balance between the Coriolis force and the pressure gradient force holds, but for which other terms such as the inertial terms involving temporal change or advective acceleration still play a key dynamic role despite their relatively small magnitude.
quasi-geostrophic theory
A theory of atmospheric dynamics that involves the quasi-geostrophic approximation in the derivation of the quasi-geostrophic equations. This theory is relatively accurate for synoptic-scale atmospheric motions in which the Rossby number is less than unity, but it cannot accurately describe some local atmospheric structures such as fronts or small, strong low-pressure cells as well as other theories.
quasi-linear convective system (QLCS)
See squall line.
quasi-stationary front
A front that is stationary or nearly so; conventionally, a front that is moving at a speed less than about 5 knots (5.8 mph).

== R ==
radar echo
The portion of the pulsed beam of microwave energy emitted by a radar transmitter that is reflected back to the receiver after the signal encounters a specific target or obstruction in the atmosphere, such as individual particles of precipitation. The term may also refer to the backscatter produced by these objects.
radar imaging
Any method that uses radar technology to map the location and characteristics of selected environmental phenomena by emitting a pulse of microwave radiation at a target and analyzing the portion that is partially returned by backscattering. Radar imaging is widely used in the atmospheric sciences to create images indicating large-scale spatial patterns of meteorological data, e.g. the intensity and distribution of precipitation, or the height and orientation of wind-driven ocean waves.
radar meteorology
A branch of meteorology concerned with the use of primarily ground-based radar technologies for the analysis and prediction of atmospheric phenomena across a wide variety of spatial scales.
radar winds
Atmospheric motion detected by using radar to track a target attached to a radiosonde, or by Doppler radar.
radiation fog
Fog formed over land, generally at night in moist, calm air under clear skies. The most common type of fog, it is caused by the radiative cooling of the Earth's surface and the lowest layers of the atmosphere when the temperature of the air near the ground decreases below its dew point. Radiation fog occurs most often in the autumn and winter, and is often deepest around sunrise but usually disperses after dawn when heated by solar radiation.
radiatus (ra)
A cloud variety characterized by broad parallel bands of cloud that appear to converge because of perspective. This variety may apply to cumulus, stratocumulus, altocumulus, altostratus, or cirrus clouds.
radiosonde

A battery-powered scientific instrument released into the atmosphere, usually by a weather balloon, which measures various atmospheric variables and transmits them by radio telemetry to a ground receiver. Radiosondes are essential sources of meteorological data.
radius of maximum wind (RMW)
The distance between the center of a cyclone and its band of strongest winds, often used as a metric for determining a cyclone's potential intensity.
rain
A type of precipitation that occurs when liquid water in the form of droplets condenses from atmospheric water vapor, becoming heavy enough to fall under gravity. Rain is a major component of the water cycle and is responsible for depositing most of the fresh water on the Earth.
rainband
A cloud and precipitation structure associated with an elongated area of rainfall and generated by differences in temperature. Rainbands may develop as squall lines ahead of cold fronts; tropical cyclones are usually composed of multiple curved rainbands.
rainbow
An optical phenomenon that takes the form of a circular arc of light separated into concentric colored bands consisting of all of the individual colors of the visible spectrum, which occurs when sunlight is refracted as it passes through water droplets in the atmosphere and is then reflected from the rear of the droplets. In a primary bow, usually appearing with an angular distance of 42° centered on the anti-solar point, the color separation produces a spectrum with red on the outer edge of the arc and violet on the inner edge; a secondary bow, with an angular distance of 51°, is also sometimes visible, but the colors are typically much dimmer and appear in the reverse order.
raindrop size distribution (DSD)
rainy season

An annually recurring period of one or more months during which precipitation, particularly rainfall, is at or near its average annual maximum for a certain region. The term is used especially in tropical climates, where the rainy season contrasts with the dry season.
rain and snow mixed
A class of precipitation composed of both rain and snow, the latter usually partially melted, that is reported in some weather observation formats. It usually occurs only briefly at any one location as a transition phase from rain to snow or vice versa.
rain gauge

An instrument used to collect and measure the amount of liquid precipitation that occurs within a certain area over a certain period of time.
rain of animals
rain shadow
A relatively and consistently dry area on the leeward side of a significant geographic uplift such as a mountain range. Rain shadows exist because the uplift acts as a barrier to the passage of precipitation-producing weather systems: moist air masses crossing high elevations are forced upward by orographic lift, which causes the moisture to condense and precipitate on the windward side, leaving the air depleted of moisture by the time it reaches the leeward side.
rain showers

Short, intense periods of rainfall, especially when occurring in widely scattered locations.
rapid intensification
ravine wind
A local wind generated as a result of a pressure gradient between two ends of a narrow valley, blowing from higher to lower pressure (usually in the downstream direction), with its velocity increased by the funneling effect of the ravine itself.
rawinsonde
A type of balloon-borne radiosonde that is tracked using position change as determined by radar or radiotheodolite in order to specifically measure wind speed and direction aloft, and sometimes also other meteorological variables.
rear flank downdraft (RFD)
regional forecast
A weather forecast for a specified geographic region, usually a wider area than that covered by a local forecast.
relative humidity
remote sensing
The acquisition of information about an object or phenomenon without making physical contact with the object and thus in contrast to on-site observation. In meteorology, satellite- or aircraft-based sensor technologies are widely used to detect and classify objects on the surface or within the atmosphere or oceans based on propagated electromagnetic signals.
reshabar
1. A strong northwesterly wind that blows across the Caucasus Mountains from the Black Sea in the west to the Caspian Sea in the east.
2. A local wind, cold in winter and hot in summer, that affects northern Syria, northern Iraq, western Iran, and southeastern Turkey.
retrogression

Any motion of an atmospheric wave or pressure system that opposes, or occurs in a direction opposite to, the normal or typical flow in which it is embedded, e.g. a situation in which Rossby waves move westward, contrary to the generally westerly winds flowing through the pattern.
Rho_hv ($\rho_{hv}$)
ridge

An elongated region of relatively high atmospheric pressure, almost always associated with an area of maximum anticyclonic curvature of wind flow. Ridges may exist at the surface or aloft or both; they may contain the closed circulation of a distinct high-pressure area, and a high may have one or more distinct ridges. Under certain conditions, ridges may alternate with troughs in a high-amplitude pattern.
rime
A coating of ice on the surface of an object. See hard rime and soft rime.
rocketsonde
A type of radiosonde that is transported into the upper atmosphere, e.g. the thermosphere, by rocket propulsion before being ejected and descending to the Earth's surface by parachute. Rocketsondes are used to make soundings at altitudes much higher than can usually be obtained by balloon or aircraft. They can provide instantaneous vertical profiles for a number of meteorological variables (temperature, pressure, ozone concentration, wind speed and direction, etc.) as they descend through the layers of the atmosphere.
rogue wave
roll cloud
An elongated, low-level accessory cloud in the shape of a horizontal tube that appears to rotate slowly about its horizontal axis, and is associated with but completely detached from the base of a cumulonimbus cloud above it. Though rare, roll clouds typically occur behind the gust front along the leading edge of a thunderstorm or squall line; they are also sometimes associated with cold fronts.

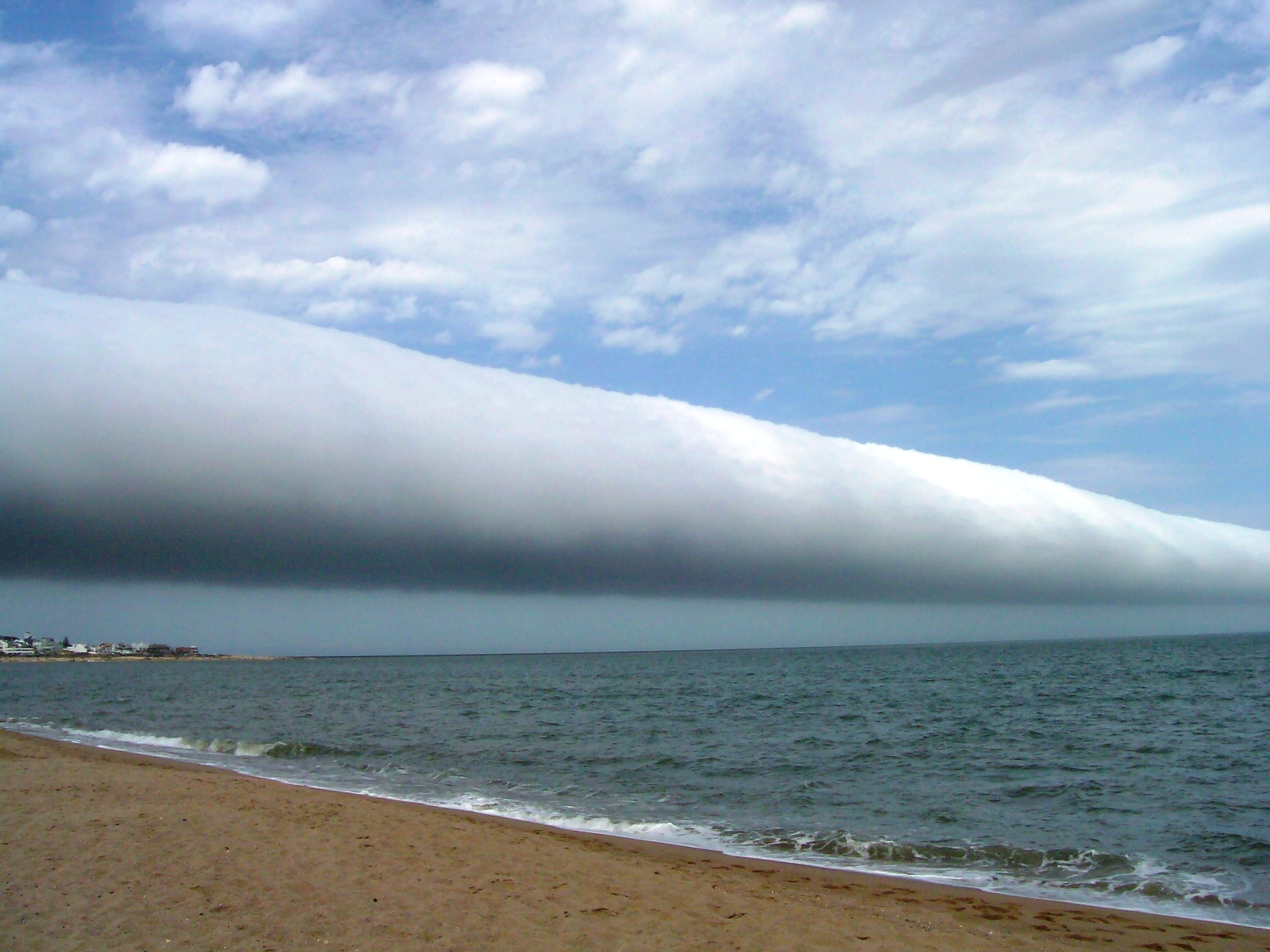
A coastal roll cloud

Rossby number
Rossby wave

A very large-scale atmospheric wave appearing on an upper-air isobaric analysis of the middle and upper troposphere. Rossby waves consist of a series of ridges and troughs with very long wavelengths (typically a few thousand kilometres) stretching around the Earth, principally in the middle latitudes. They are strongly linked to surface weather patterns.
rotation
See cyclonic rotation.

== S ==
saddle point
See col.
Saffir–Simpson hurricane wind scale (SSHWS)

A rating system used to classify hurricanes (tropical cyclones in the Western Hemisphere) into one of five categories according to the intensity of their sustained winds, measured as the maximum sustained wind speed averaged over a one-minute interval at an altitude of 10 meters above the surface. Category 1, the lowest rating on the scale, indicates average sustained wind speeds of 33–42 metres per second (64–82 kn; 74–94 mph), where the lower limit is also used to define the distinction between a tropical storm and a hurricane; Category 5, the highest rating, indicates wind speeds of 70 metres per second (136 kn; 157 mph) or more.
sandstorm
See dust storm.
sastrugi

Sharp, irregular grooves or ridges formed on a snow surface by wind erosion, saltation of snow particles, and deposition, usually parallel to the prevailing winds. They are often found in the polar regions and in large, open areas such as frozen lakes in cold temperate regions.
satellite sounding
An atmospheric sounding obtained from instruments on a meteorological satellite in orbit around the Earth.
satellite tornado
An independent tornado that revolves around a larger, primary tornado (typically a very large and intense one) and interacts with the same mesocyclone. Satellite tornadoes are distinct from the subvortices of a multiple-vortex tornado, though they may still merge into their companion tornado.
saturated adiabat

A curved line drawn on a thermodynamic diagram that traces the path of a moisture-saturated air parcel as it moves through the atmosphere adiabatically. Saturated parcels tend to behave very differently from dry parcels; the latter are instead described by a dry adiabat.
saturated adiabatic lapse rate (SALR)

saturation vapor pressure
The maximum possible partial pressure exerted by a quantity of water vapor in the atmosphere at a given temperature. Saturation vapor pressure increases non-linearly with air temperature according to the Clausius–Clapeyron relation, such that the vapor pressure in millibars at 32 °C (90 °F) is approximately double the value at 21 °C (70 °F).
scarf cloud
See pileus.
scavenging
The process by which particulate matter in the atmosphere is captured and removed by precipitation.
scud
See pannus.
sea breeze
An onshore local wind that blows from sea to land, a result of the more rapid warming of the land surface relative to the sea during the day. It blows in the opposite direction of a land breeze, its nighttime counterpart in a diurnal cycle of coastal winds caused by lateral differences in surface temperature between land and sea.
sea spray
Aerosol particles formed directly by the ocean, mostly by ejection into the atmosphere by bursting bubbles at the air-sea interface.
sea state
sea surface temperature (SST)

The water temperature of the surface layer of a sea or ocean, usually measured at a depth between 1 millimetre (0.04 in) and 20 metres (70 ft) beneath the surface. Air masses in the atmosphere are strongly influenced by sea surface temperatures within a short distance of the shore.
season
Any division of the year marked by changes in weather, ecology, and the duration of daylight. Seasons result from the Earth's orbit around the Sun and its axial tilt relative to the ecliptic plane. In temperate and polar regions, four calendar-based seasons – spring, summer, autumn, and winter – are generally marked by significant changes in the intensity of sunlight that reaches the Earth's surface; these changes become less dramatic as one approaches the Equator, and so many tropical regions have only two or three seasons, such as a wet season and a dry season. In certain parts of the world, the term is also used to describe the timing of important ecological events, such as hurricane seasons, flood seasons, and wildfire seasons.
secondary front
A front that arises between two air masses which, despite nominally originating from the same source region, have acquired different meteorological properties because they have followed different paths or are of different ages.
secular trend
A gradual change (either an increase or a decrease) in the values of one or more measured variables (e.g. temperature) that takes place over a long period of time, after the effects of fluctuations that occur over comparatively short periods have been removed.
seiche
A stationary or standing wave (i.e. a wave that oscillates in time without moving through space) that occurs in an enclosed or semi-enclosed body of water, such as a lake or bay, or in the atmosphere, continuing to oscillate for some time after the force initiating its formation has ceased (occasionally as long as several days). Seiches may be caused by a variety of forces, including strong winds, earthquakes, landslides, and sudden changes in atmospheric pressure.
sensible heat
The heat absorbed or transmitted by a substance during a change in temperature that is not accompanied by a change of phase (i.e. enthalpy) and which can be measured or "sensed", e.g. with a thermometer. Contrast latent heat.
sensible temperature
The temperature of the air or an object as it is felt or experienced by an individual. This may differ from the actual measured temperature for any of a number of reasons, e.g. as a result of humidity (as with a heat index) or wind speed (as with wind chill). Compare apparent temperature.
severe thunderstorm
A type of severe weather consisting of an especially strong or intense thunderstorm accompanied by locally damaging downdraft winds exceeding 50 knots (58 mph), heavy rain, frequent lightning, and/or large hailstones with a diameter of at least 20 millimetres (0.79 in). Severe thunderstorms are often capable of producing tornadoes as well.
severe weather
Any dangerous meteorological phenomena with the potential to cause damage on the ground surface, serious social disruption, or loss of human life. There are many types of severe weather, including strong winds, excessive precipitation, thunderstorms, tornadoes, tropical cyclones, blizzards, and wildfires. Some severe weather may be more or less typical of a given region during a given season; other phenomena may be atypical or unpredictable.
sferics
See atmospherics.
shade temperature
The air temperature as measured by a thermometer housed inside an instrument shelter, which allows air to circulate freely around the thermometer while sheltering it from the potentially confounding effects of direct solar radiation, precipitation, and thermal energy emitted from the ground and surrounding objects. Shade temperature is a standard meteorological method for measuring air temperature.
sheet lightning
A diffuse illumination of the sky caused by a lightning discharge in which the bolt form of the discharge is not visible to an observer because of the presence of an obfuscating cloud.
shelf cloud

A low, elongated, wedge-shaped accessory cloud that occurs along a gust front, often masking the boundary between updrafts and downdrafts. Shelf clouds are associated with and attached to the base of a cumulonimbus cloud, unlike roll clouds, which are not attached.
short wave
Any relatively small, short-wavelength ripple (i.e. a trough or a ridge) superimposed upon a longer wave pattern in the planetary-scale movement of air currents within the middle and upper troposphere. Short-wave troughs in particular are frequently associated with major cyclonic developments.
shower
A brief downpour of precipitation (especially rain, but also snow or hail) that starts and ends abruptly and typically lasts less than 10 minutes. Showers are characterized by rapid changes in intensity and are usually associated with convective clouds (e.g. cumulonimbus) which do not completely cover the sky, such that brightness is frequently evident during showers.
SIGMET
significant level
In a radiosonde observation, an altitude or elevation (other than a mandatory level) for which temperature, pressure, and humidity are reported because temperature and/or moisture content data at that level are sufficiently important or unusual to warrant the attention of the forecaster, or because they are required for the accurate portrayal of the observation.
simoom
single cell thunderstorm
See air-mass thunderstorm.
sirocco
skew-T log-P diagram
sky
Skywarn

The storm spotting program of the U.S. National Weather Service. Skywarn organizations have also been formed in Europe and Canada.
skipping tornado
sleet
slush
A slurry mixture of small ice crystals (such as snow) and liquid water. Slush forms when ice or snow melts.
snow
A type of solid precipitation in the form of ice crystals which precipitate from the atmosphere and subsequently undergo changes on the Earth's surface. Snow occurs when particles in the atmosphere attract supercooled water droplets, which nucleate and freeze into hexagonal crystals known as snowflakes; upon reaching the ground it may then accumulate into snowpack or snowdrifts and, over time, metamorphose by sintering, sublimation, and freeze-thaw mechanisms. Unless the local climate is cold enough to maintain persistent snow cover on the ground, snow typically melts seasonally.
snow gauge
An instrument for measuring snowfall by quantifying the accumulation of snow in an area of specified size, either by capturing and retaining the snow, which is subsequently melted into water in order to yield an easily quantifiable measure, or by weighing it. The latter form is capable of providing a continuous record of the rate of snowfall.
snow grains
snow roller

A phenomenon in which large snowballs form naturally as clumps of snow are blown along the ground by strong winds, growing larger as they accumulate material along the way.
Snowbelt
A region near the Great Lakes of North America where heavy snowfall in the form of lake-effect snow is particularly common.
snowdrift
A deposit of snow sculpted by wind into a mound during a snowstorm.
snowflake
snowspout
See winter waterspout.
snowsquall
A sudden, moderately heavy snowfall characterized by strong surface wind gusts and blowing snow. It is similar to a blizzard but is more local in scale, and snow accumulations may or may not be significant.
snowstorm

A type of winter storm accompanied particularly by heavy precipitation in the form of snow. Very large snowstorms with strong winds and meeting certain other criteria are called blizzards.
SODAR
soft hail
See graupel.
solar irradiance
solarimeter
See pyranometer.
sounding
See atmospheric sounding.
sounding balloon
See weather balloon.
sounding rocket

A sub-orbital rocket carrying scientific instruments designed to record measurements and perform experiments in the upper atmosphere while in flight, usually reaching altitudes ranging from 48 to 145 kilometres (30 to 90 mi) above the surface of the Earth, i.e. higher than weather balloons but lower than weather satellites.
specific humidity
spindrift

Sea spray blown from cresting waves during a gale. This spray "drifts" in the direction of the gale and is distinct enough that it is sometimes used to judge wind speed at sea.
spring
sprite
squall
A sudden, sharp increase in sustained wind speed that lasts for several minutes, as opposed to a gust, which lasts only for a few seconds. Squalls are technically defined as an increase of at least 8 meters per second (16 kn) to a minimum sustained wind speed of 11 meters per second (21 kn) lasting in excess of one minute, or an increase of at least 3 in force on the Beaufort scale to force 6 or higher. There may be even higher gusts during a squall. They are generally associated with active weather such as rain showers, thunderstorms, or snowstorms, and in colloquial usage the term often refers to the storm or cell itself, not just the wind.
squall line

An approximately linear band or chain of thunderstorms, especially one forming along or immediately preceding a cold front. In archaic usage the term was synonymous with cold front, in the same way that squall was once used to refer to a thunderstorm, though squall is now used more broadly to refer to any storm with strong winds. Like the fronts with which they are associated, squall lines can extend for hundreds of kilometers. See also rainband.
St. Elmo's fire
A weather phenomenon in which luminous plasma is created by a corona discharge at the tips of long, sharply pointed objects in a strong atmospheric electrical field, such as that generated by a thunderstorm.
standard atmosphere
A unit of pressure defined as exactly 101,325 pascals (760 torrs; 29.9 inches of mercury; 14.7 pounds per square inch), which is approximately equal to Earth's average atmospheric pressure at sea level. It is used in meteorology and many other scientific contexts as a standardized or reference pressure.
standing cloud
See cap cloud.
static atmospheric model
station model
stationary front
steam devil
steering
Any influence upon the direction of movement of an atmospheric disturbance that is exerted by another aspect of the state of the atmosphere.
Stevenson screen
storm
Any disturbed state of an environment or atmosphere especially affecting the ground surface and strongly implying severe weather. Storms are characterized by significant disruptions to normal atmospheric conditions, which can result in strong wind, heavy precipitation, and/or thunder and lightning (as with a thunderstorm), among other phenomena. They are created when a center of low pressure develops within a system of high pressure surrounding it.
storm cell
An air mass which contains up and down drafts in convective loops and which moves and reacts as a single entity. It functions as the smallest unit of a storm-producing weather system.
storm chasing
Storm Data and Unusual Weather Phenomena (SD)

A National Climatic Data Center (NCDC) publication beginning in 1959 which details quality-controlled tornado and other severe weather summaries as the official NOAA record of such events.
storm shelter

A type of underground bunker designed to protect the occupants from violent severe weather, particularly tornadoes.
storm spotting
A type of weather spotting in which observers watch for the approach of storms and severe weather and actively relay their findings to local meteorological authorities.
storm surge
Storm Prediction Center (SPC)
Storm Track
straight-line wind

Any very strong and potentially damaging wind that lacks the rotational damage pattern associated with the winds of a tornado and hence is said to blow in a "straight line". Straight-line winds commonly accompany the gust front of a thunderstorm or originate with a downburst and may gust as high as 130 mph (210 km/h).
stratocumulus (Sc)
A cloud genus common at low altitudes, especially over the ocean, and characterized by a distinct layer of regular clumps or rolls with dark shading.
stratocumuliform
stratosphere
The second major layer of the Earth's atmosphere, above the troposphere and below the mesosphere. The lower boundary of the stratosphere varies between 7 and 20 km (4.3 and 12.4 mi) above the Earth's surface, depending on latitude.
stratospheric oscillation
See quasi-biennial oscillation.
stratus
striation
A fine, narrow groove or channel in a cloud formation, formed parallel to the direction of the airflow, thus giving a visible indication of the flow relative to the parent cloud. Striations are often observed in the rotating updrafts of strong thunderstorms, where they may produce a conspicuous "barber's pole" effect. See also corrugations.
Stüve diagram
subtropical cyclone
subtropical high
summer
sun dog
See parhelion.
sunshine recorder
sunshower
A meteorological phenomenon in which rain falls while the sun is shining.
supercell
surface boundary layer
The thin, lowermost layer of the atmosphere that is in direct contact with the ground or water surface, loosely defined as the layer below the standard height of anemometers, i.e. below 10 metres (33 ft). Friction effects are largely uniform at all depths within this layer, and wind speed and direction are primarily determined by local surface topography and by the vertical temperature distribution. It is a subdivision of the broader planetary boundary layer.
surface weather analysis
surface weather observation
sustained wind
synoptic scale meteorology

== T ==
tail cloud

A ragged band of cloud and/or fractus extending from a wall cloud toward the precipitation core.
temperature
A physical quantity expressing the thermal motion of a substance, such as a mass of air in the atmosphere, and proportional to the average kinetic energy of the random microscopic motions of the substance's constituent particles. Temperature is measured with a thermometer calibrated in one or more temperature scales: the Kelvin scale is the standard used in scientific contexts, but the Celsius and Fahrenheit scales are more commonly used in everyday contexts and for weather forecasting.
temperature gradient
A physical quantity that describes in which direction and at what rate the temperature changes within or across a particular system or location. It is typically expressed in units of degrees (on a particular temperature scale) per unit length; the SI unit is kelvin per meter (K/m).
temperature inversion
tephigram
terminal aerodrome forecast (TAF)
A format for reporting current and forecast weather conditions, particularly as such information relates to aviation. Standard TAFs are issued by major civil airfields at least four times a day (every six hours) and generally apply to a 24- or 30-hour period and an area within approximately 8 kilometres (5.0 mi) from the center of an airport runway complex. TAFs complement and use similar encoding to METAR reports, but also take into account local geographic influences on weather.
Terminal Doppler Weather Radar (TDWR)
thermal

A column of rising air in the lower altitudes of the Earth's atmosphere. It is a form of atmospheric updraft created by the uneven heating of the Earth's surface by solar radiation, and an example of atmospheric convection.
thermal wind
The vector difference between the geostrophic wind at two different altitudes in the atmosphere, i.e. the hypothetical vertical wind shear that would exist if the wind obeyed geostrophic balance in the horizontal direction while atmospheric pressure obeyed hydrostatic balance in the vertical direction. The name is derived from the notion of a theoretical wind that blows parallel to the thickness contours plotted on a thickness chart, where the thickness of the layers between isobaric surfaces is proportional to the mean temperature, with high values corresponding to warm air and low values to cold air.
thermo-hygrograph

An instrument that combines the functions of a thermograph and a hygrograph by recording both temperature and humidity simultaneously on a single chart.
thermodynamic diagrams
thermometer
An instrument used to measure temperature or a temperature gradient.
thermosphere
The fourth major layer of the Earth's atmosphere, above the mesosphere and below the exosphere. The lower boundary of the thermosphere is situated at approximately 80 km (50 mi) above the Earth's surface. Molecules in the thermosphere are exposed to highly energetic solar and cosmic radiation, and unlike in the other atmospheric layers, absorption of this energy causes temperatures in the thermosphere to increase with altitude.
thunder
The sound produced as a result of the sudden thermal expansion of air within and surrounding the channel of a lightning discharge. This expansion creates an audible supersonic shock wave that, depending on the listener's distance from the source, can range from a sharp, loud crack (sometimes called a thunderclap or peal of thunder) to a deep, sustained rumble. Thunder is a defining feature of thunderstorms.
thundershower
A relatively weak thunderstorm.
thundersnow
thunderstorm

A storm characterized by the presence of lightning and its acoustic effect on the Earth's atmosphere, known as thunder. Thunderstorms result from the rapid upward movement of warm, moist air, often along a front. They can develop in any geographic location but are most common in the mid-latitudes. They are usually accompanied by strong winds and heavy rain; especially strong or severe thunderstorms can produce some of the most dangerous weather phenomena, including large hail, downbursts, and tornadoes.
thunderstorm asthma
tilted updraft
tornado

A rapidly rotating column of air that is in contact with both a parent cloud and the surface of the Earth. Tornadoes come in many shapes and sizes, and they are often visible in the form of a condensed funnel originating from the base of a cumulonimbus cloud, usually during a thunderstorm, with a cloud of rotating dust and debris beneath it. The most extreme tornadoes can achieve wind speeds of more than 480 km/h (300 mph), span more than 3.2 km (2.0 mi) in diameter, and stay on the ground for more than 100 km (dozens of miles) before dissipating.

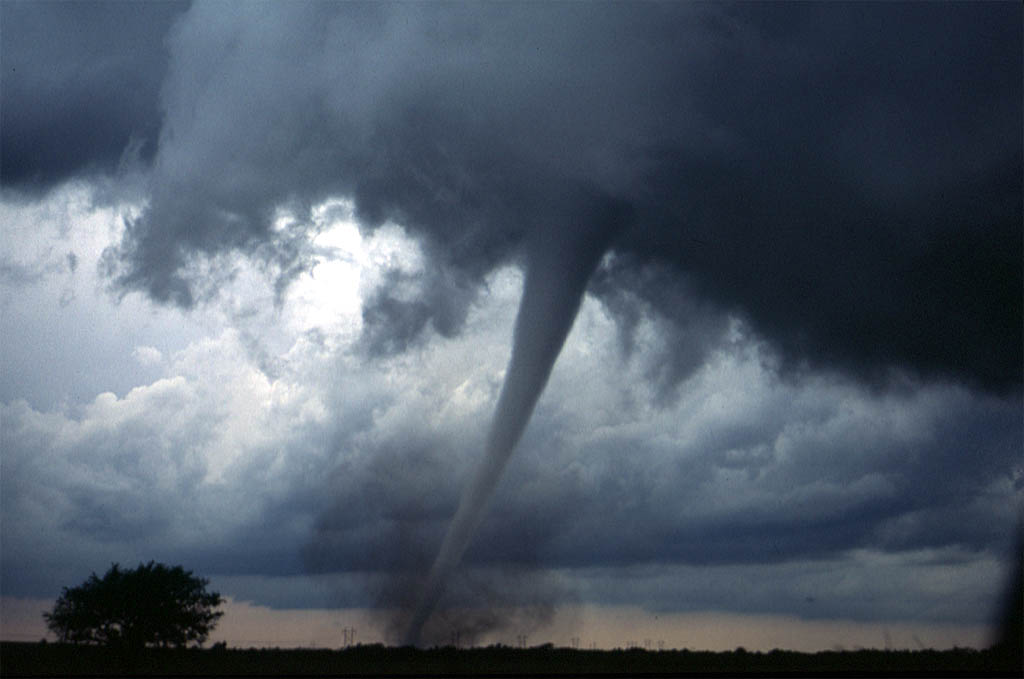
A tornado in the U.S. state of Oklahoma

Tornado Alley
tornado climatology
tornado debris signature (TDS)

An area of high reflectivity detected by weather radar that is caused by large amounts of debris being lofted into the air, which is often indicative of a tornado.
tornado emergency
tornado family
tornadogenesis
tornado outbreak
The occurrence of multiple tornadoes (typically at least six to ten) spawned by the same synoptic scale weather system, usually within the same day and in the same region.
tornado outbreak sequence

A period of continuous or nearly continuous tornado activity consisting of a series of tornado outbreaks spanning multiple days, with very few or no days lacking outbreaks.
tornado preparedness
tornado vortex signature (TVS)
A rotation algorithm detected by weather radar that indicates the likely presence of a strong mesocyclone such as a tornado. Such signatures can be used to track the location and development of a tornadic rotation within a larger storm.
tornado warning
tornado watch
Tornado and Storm Research Organisation (TORRO)
TORRO scale
Totable Tornado Observatory (TOTO)
trace
An amount of precipitation that is too small to reliably or accurately measure.
training
tropical cyclone

A very large, rapidly rotating storm system characterized by a low-pressure center surrounded by a closed low-level atmospheric circulation, strong winds, and continuous spiral bands of thunderstorms that produce heavy rain. Tropical cyclones develop almost exclusively over and derive their strength from warm tropical seas. The strongest systems can last for more than a week, span more than 1,600 km (1,000 mi) in diameter, and cause significant damage to coastal regions with powerful winds, storm surges, and concentrated precipitation that leads to flooding. Depending on its location and strength, a tropical cyclone may be referred to by different names and categorized within a variety of classes.
tropical cyclone scales
tropical cyclogenesis
The process by which a tropical cyclone develops and strengthens within the atmosphere. The mechanisms governing cyclone formation in the tropics are distinct from those that govern the development of subtropical and extratropical cyclones.
tropical depression
tropical disturbance
tropical storm
tropical wave
A type of atmospheric trough or low-pressure system which forms over the tropics and causes cloudiness and thunderstorms as it moves. Tropical waves represent an early, disorganized stage of tropical cyclogenesis; if conditions are favorable, they may develop into much stronger tropical cyclones. The term is used primarily in the North Atlantic and Northeastern Pacific basins.
tropics
The region of the Earth surrounding the Equator, generally delimited in latitude between the Tropic of Cancer (23°26' N) in the Northern Hemisphere and the Tropic of Capricorn (23°26' S) in the Southern Hemisphere.
tropopause
The boundary in the Earth's atmosphere between the troposphere and the stratosphere, on average situated approximately 17 km (11 mi) above equatorial regions and 9 km (5.6 mi) above the polar regions.
troposphere
The lowest layer of the Earth's atmosphere, within which nearly all weather phenomena occur. The troposphere contains approximately 75% of the atmosphere's total mass and 99% of its water vapor and aerosols. The average height of the troposphere above the Earth's surface varies between 6 and 18 km (3.7 and 11.2 mi) depending on latitude.
trough
An elongated region of relatively low atmospheric pressure, often associated with a front. Troughs may exist at the surface or aloft or both; the lifting of moist air by convergent winds usually causes clouds and precipitation to follow immediately behind a trough. Under certain conditions, troughs may alternate with ridges in a high-amplitude pattern.
trowal

A line on a synoptic chart marking the projection onto the Earth's surface of the base of the wedge of warm air aloft that is found at an occlusion. The passage of a trowal normally results in changes in cloud type, precipitation, and pressure tendency.
tsunami
turbulence
Fluid motion characterized by chaotic changes in pressure and flow velocity, caused by excessive kinetic energy in parts of the fluid flow.
twilight
1. The indirect illumination of the lower atmosphere caused by the scattering of sunlight when the Sun itself is not directly visible because it is below the horizon.
2. The time period during which such illumination occurs, either between astronomical dawn and sunrise or between sunset and astronomical dusk.
TWISTEX
An acronym for Tactical Weather-Instrumented Sampling in/near Tornadoes EXperiment.
typhoon
The local name for a tropical cyclone that occurs in the northwestern Pacific Ocean, between 180° and 100°E in the Northern Hemisphere.

== U ==
unstable air mass
Any air mass with high convective instability, characterized by dramatic vertical air currents.
updraft

Any vertical current of rising air in the atmosphere, often within a cloud, especially one originating from the tendency of warm air to ascend in altitude. Updrafts commonly develop when multiple smaller, more general ascending currents called thermals become concentrated and organized into a single flow, often as compensation for the development of a strong current of cold air moving in the opposite direction, known as a downdraft. Updrafts and downdrafts together are associated with the strong atmospheric convective forces that characterize multicell and supercell storm systems, and play important roles in the formation of tropical cyclones and tornadoes.
upper-air chart
upper-air sounding
upper-level low
upper-level outflow
upslope fog
urban heat island (UHI)
An urban or metropolitan area within which air temperatures are significantly warmer than in surrounding rural or uninhabited areas as a result of human activities, especially the artificial modification of land surfaces and the generation of waste heat by energy usage. Urban heat islands can greatly influence precipitation, air quality, and the likelihood of certain weather phenomena in the vicinity of large cities, though not all cities have a distinct urban heat island.
US Standard Atmosphere
University Corporation for Atmospheric Research (UCAR)

== V ==
valley breeze
valley exit jet
vertical draft
See updraft.
vertically integrated liquid (VIL)
An estimate of the total mass of precipitation contained in a cloud, obtained by measuring the intensity of radar echoes returned from the atmosphere.
vertical wind shear
virga
virtual temperature ($T_v$)
The temperature of a moist air parcel at which a theoretical dry air parcel would have a total pressure and density equal to those of the moist parcel.
visibility
visual flight rules (VFR)
A set of regulations under which a pilot operates an aircraft in weather conditions generally clear enough to allow the pilot to see where the aircraft is going, as opposed to instrument flight rules, under which operation of the aircraft primarily occurs through referencing the onboard instruments rather than through visual reference to the ground and environs.
Von Kármán constant
Von Kármán vortex street
Von Kármán wind turbulence model
vortex

A region within a fluid in which the flow revolves around an axis line, which may be straight or curved. Vortices are a major component of turbulence and may be observed in many types of meteorological phenomena, including the winds surrounding a tropical cyclone, tornado, or dust devil.
vorticity

== W ==
wall cloud

A large, localized, persistent, and often abrupt lowering of cloud that develops beneath the surrounding base of a cumulonimbus cloud and from which tornadoes sometimes form.
warm advection
The movement, by horizontal winds, of warm air into an area. Sometimes, low-level warm advection is erroneously referred as "overruning".
warm front
A type of front located at the leading edge of a warmer air mass as it overtakes a cooler air mass that is moving more slowly in the same direction. Warm fronts lie within broader troughs of low pressure than cold fronts, which sometimes follow them, and the temperature difference between the air masses they separate is often greater. Stratiform clouds, fog, and steady rain with occasional thunderstorms often precede the boundary as it moves. In surface weather analysis, warm fronts are symbolized by a red line with semicircles pointing in the direction of travel.
watch
A class of weather advisory issued by a meteorological agency or weather forecasting service to notify the public that conditions in the coverage area are favorable for the development of a particular form of hazardous or severe weather, though the hazardous weather itself is not currently present, e.g. a tornado watch or hazardous seas watch. Watches are usually issued for a large geographic area, often for one or more administrative jurisdictions (e.g. counties in the United States). A watch is the first stage of a weather alert, indicating the need for precautionary planning, preparedness, and taking steps to ensure that any further information communicated by the issuing service will be received. It is distinct from and often precedes a warning, which indicates the imminent approach of hazardous weather.
water vapor
Water in its gaseous state. Water vapor is ubiquitous in the atmosphere, being continuously generated by evaporation and removed by condensation, and plays a major role in numerous meteorological processes.
waterspout
wave cyclone
See extratropical cyclone.
weak echo region (WER)
weather
The state of the atmosphere at a given time and location. Weather is driven by a diverse set of naturally occurring phenomena, especially air pressure, temperature, and moisture differences between one place and another, most of which occur in the troposphere.
weather balloon

A high-altitude balloon used to carry scientific instruments into the atmosphere, which then measure, record, and transmit information about meteorological variables such as atmospheric pressure, temperature, humidity, and wind speed by means of a radiosonde or other measurement device, often one which is expendable. Weather balloons are only feasible in the lower atmosphere and typically do not exceed 40 kilometres (25 mi) in altitude; higher parts of the atmosphere are generally studied with sounding rockets or satellites.
weather bomb
See explosive cyclogenesis.
weather forecasting
The application of science and technology to predict the conditions of the atmosphere at a given time and location. Weather forecasts are made by collecting quantitative data about the current state of the atmosphere at a given place and then using meteorology to project how the atmosphere will change. Forecasting is important to a wide variety of human activities, including business, agriculture, transportation, recreation and general health and safety, because it can be used to protect life and property.
weather front
See front.
weather map
A map which displays various meteorological features across a particular area for a particular point or range of time. Weather maps often use symbols such as station models to conveniently present complicated meteorological data. They are used for both research and weather forecasting purposes.
weather modification
Weather Prediction Center (WPC)
Weather Surveillance Radar (WSR)
1. In the United States, WSR-1, WSR-57, WSR-74, and WSR-88D.
2. In Canada, the Canadian weather radar network (WKR and CWMN).
weather reconnaissance
weather satellite
weather spotting
The act of observing weather, often on the ground, for the purpose of reporting to a larger group or organization, such as the U.S. National Weather Service.
weather station
Any facility, either on land or at sea, with instruments and equipment for measuring atmospheric conditions in order to provide information for weather forecasts and to study the weather and/or climate.
weather vane

An instrument (often an architectural ornament) used to indicate the direction of the wind.
Weatherwise
A photographically adorned general interest weather magazine that frequently publishes articles on tornadoes and other severe weather.
wet-bulb temperature (WBT)
The temperature that a given parcel of air would have if it were cooled adiabatically at constant pressure to saturation (i.e. 100% relative humidity) by the evaporation of water into the parcel, with the latent heat supplied by the parcel; or, equivalently, the lowest temperature that could hypothetically be reached under ambient conditions solely by evaporative cooling. At 100% relative humidity, the wet-bulb temperature is equal to the dry-bulb temperature; at lower humidity, it is lower than the dry-bulb temperature due to the loss of latent heat by evaporative cooling.
wet-bulb globe temperature
wet season
An annual period of relatively high or frequent precipitation, during which most of a region's annual total rainfall (or snowfall) occurs and weather patterns are dominated by lengthy periods of low atmospheric pressure, extensive cloud cover, and high humidity. The term is primarily used in the tropics, in contrast to the dry season.
whirlwind
Any vertically oriented rotating vortex of air that develops as a result of turbulent air currents created by heating and flow gradients. Examples include major whirlwinds such as tornadoes, waterspouts, and landspouts and minor whirlwinds such as gustnadoes and dust devils.
wildfire
willy-willy
See dust devil.
wind
The bulk movement of air within the Earth's atmosphere. Wind occurs on a wide range of scales, from very strong thunderstorm flows lasting tens of minutes to milder local breezes lasting a few hours to global atmospheric circulations caused by the differential heating of the Equator and the poles and the Earth's rotation. Winds are often referred to by their strength and direction; the many types of wind are classified according to their spatial scale, their speed, the types of forces that cause them, the regions in which they occur, and their effects.
wind chill

A meteorological index that estimates the effect of wind speed on the apparent temperature perceived by humans, particularly the decrease in human body temperature attributable to the movement of cold air. There is no universally agreed-upon formula for measuring or calculating wind chill, though it is commonly reported as a temperature. It is usually defined only for air temperatures at or below 10 °C (50 °F) and wind speeds above 4.8 km/h (3.0 mph).
wind direction
The direction from which a wind originates; e.g. a northerly wind blows from the north to the south. Wind direction is usually reported using cardinal directions or in azimuth degrees measured clockwise from due north. Instruments such as windsocks, weather vanes, and anemometers are commonly used to indicate wind direction.
wind gradient
wind gust
A brief increase in the speed of the wind, usually lasting less than 20 seconds. Gusts are more transient than squalls. They are usually only reported by weather stations when the maximum or peak wind speed exceeds the average or sustained wind speed by 10–15 knots (12–17 mph).
wind profiler
wind shear

Any difference in wind speed and/or direction over a relatively short distance in the atmosphere. Atmospheric wind shear is normally described as either vertical or horizontal.
wind speed
The measured speed of the air comprising a wind. Changes in wind speed are often caused by air parcels being exposed to pressure and temperature gradients in the atmosphere. Wind speed is measured with an anemometer, but may also be less precisely classified using the Beaufort scale.
windsonde
A radiosonde specifically designed for determining wind conditions in the upper levels of the atmosphere, particularly one that transmits only pressure observations and not temperature or humidity data.
windstorm
Any storm that produces or is characterized by very strong winds.
windsock
A tapered conical tube made from a lightweight fabric, often brightly colored and hung loosely from a pole in an open area in order to serve as a simple visual indicator of wind speed and direction by filling with air as the wind blows. A windsock fills and points in the opposite direction from which the wind is blowing (e.g. if the wind is blowing from the west, the windsock will point east), and the angle at which it hangs from the pole can provide a basic approximation of wind speed (e.g. if the wind is very light, the windsock may hang limply at a shallow angle; if it is very strong, the windsock may point straight out from the pole and flap wildly). Windsocks are commonly employed at airports to provide useful real-time visual approximations of the wind's strength and direction to pilots.
winter
winter storm

1. Any storm which occurs during the local winter.
2. Any meteorological event in which varieties of precipitation which can only occur at low temperatures are formed, such as snow, sleet, or freezing rain. Such events are not necessarily restricted to the winter season but may occur in late autumn or early spring, or very rarely in the summer, as well.
winter waterspout

World Meteorological Organization (WMO)

== X ==
X band

== Y ==
yellow wind
Younger Dryas

== Z ==
Z-R relation
Zdr
zastrugi
See sastrugi.
zephyr
zonal flow
Zonda wind
zud

== See also ==
- Outline of meteorology
- Timeline of meteorology
- Glossary of climate change
- Glossary of tornado terms
- Glossary of tropical cyclone terms
- List of weather instruments
