= Valley exit jet =

A valley exit jet is a strong, down-valley, elevated air current that emerges above the intersection of the valley and its adjacent plain. These winds frequently reach a maximum of 20 m/s (45 mph) at a height of 40–200 m (130–660 ft) above the ground. Surface winds below the jet may sway vegetation but are significantly weaker.

The presence of these strong nighttime down-valley air flows has been documented at the mouth of many Alpine valleys that merge with basins, such as the Inn Valley of Austria, where the jet is strong enough to be heard at the ground. In the United States, exit jet signatures have been observed at the North Fork Gunnison River at Paonia, Colorado; the exit of South Boulder Creek south of Boulder, Colorado; Albuquerque, New Mexico at the mouth of Tijeras Canyon; and the mouth of Spanish Fork Canyon in Utah.

== Theory ==
Exit jets are likely to be found in valley regions that exhibit diurnal mountain wind systems, such as those of the dry mountain ranges of the US. These diurnal wind systems are driven by horizontal pressure gradients. Due to the abrupt transition over a short distance between the valley high pressure and the basin low pressure, the gradients are strongest near the valley exit, producing a jet.

Other meteorological factors acting to increase exit wind speeds are the acceleration of winds originating inside the valley as they travel to lower elevations downvalley, and the process of cold valley air sinking and ejecting into the plain. Deep valleys that terminate abruptly at a plain are more impacted by these factors than are those that gradually become shallower as downvalley distance increases.

== Impacts ==
Valley exit jets can play a major role in the mitigation of air pollution:

- Airflow emerging into the basin is cleaner due to lower aerosol content
- Vertical mixing resulting from directional shear and from the convergence of the jet with basin scale flows reduces ozone and other pollutants.
- Surface eddies created near canyon mouths inhibit the transport of pollution.

Methods of examining exit jets include remote sensing and direct observation. SODAR and Doppler LIDAR have been used in numerous studies to identify, quantify and relate the jets to atmospheric transport of hazardous materials. Detailed profiles of winds at canyon exits can be directly observed and calculated using a single or double theodolite and tethersondes.

The identification and measurement of valley exit jets can also significantly aid in fire control, as fire often rides valley jets, as well as the development of wind energy.
