= Lightning activity level =

Lightning activity level (LAL) is a scale that describes degrees and types of lightning activity. Values are labeled 1–6. This system is no longer used in wildland fire forecasts.

Lightning Activity Levels
Level	Description
1	No thunderstorms
2	Isolated thunderstorms. Lightning is very infrequent, 1–5 cloud-to-ground strikes in a five-minute period.
3	Widely scattered thunderstorms. Lightning is infrequent, 6–10 cloud-to-ground strikes in a five-minute period.
4	Scattered thunderstorms. Lightning is frequent, 11–15 cloud-to-ground strikes in a 5-minute period.
5	Numerous thunderstorms. Lightning is frequent and intense, greater than 15 cloud-to-ground strikes in a five-minute period.
6	Dry lightning (same as LAL 3 but without rain). This type of lightning has the potential for starting fires, and is normally highlighted in fire weather forecasts with a red flag warning.
