= Orographic lift =

Air mass forced upwards as it moves over rising terrain

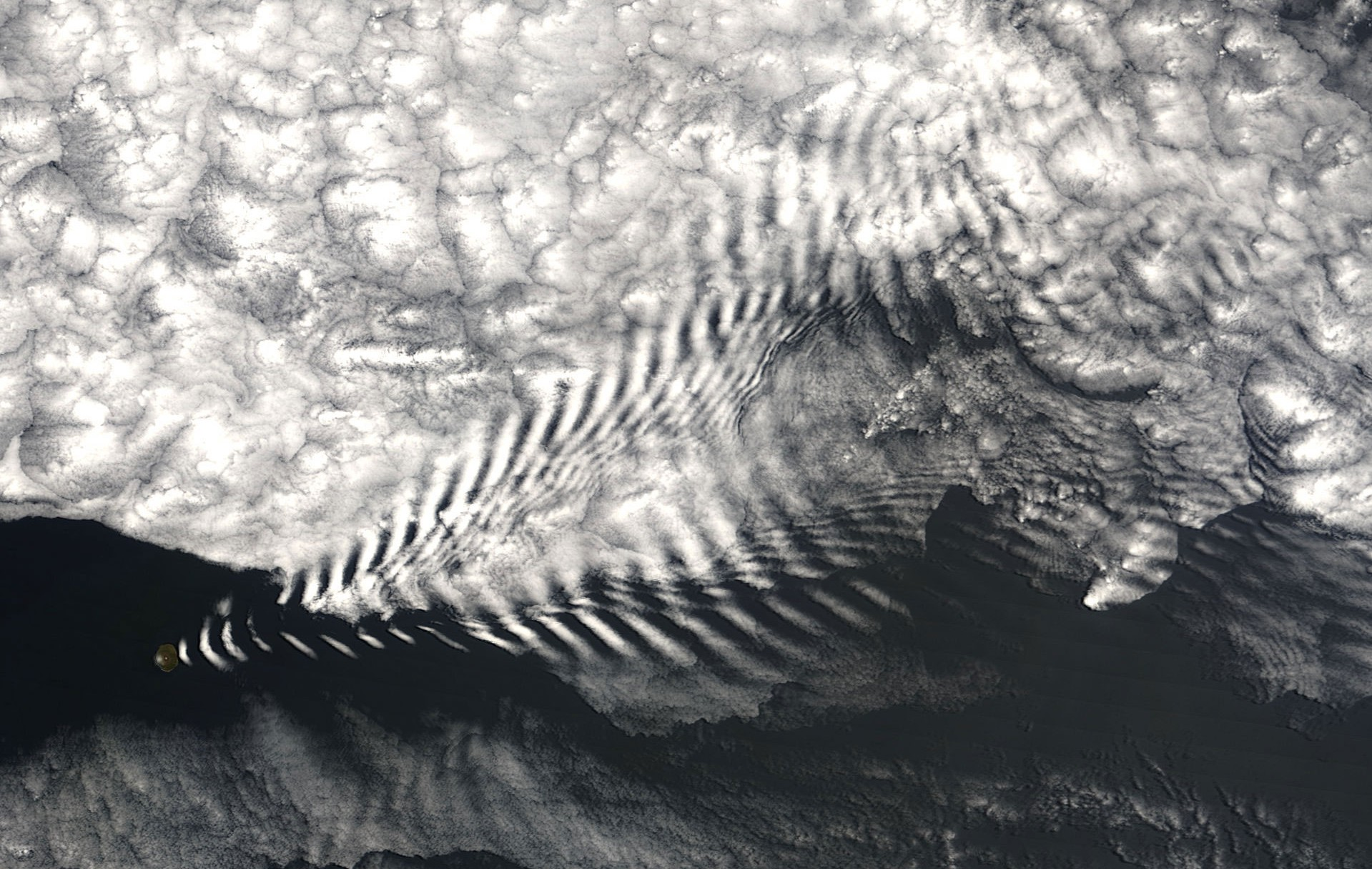
A gravity wave cloud pattern—analogous to a ship wake—in the downwind zone behind the Île Amsterdam, seen from above over the far southern Indian Ocean. The island generates wave motion in the wind passing over it, creating regularly spaced orographic clouds. The wave crests raise and cool the air to form clouds, while the troughs remain too low for cloud formation. Note that while the wave motion is generated by orographic lift, it is not required. In other words, one cloud often forms at the peak. See wave cloud.

Orographic lift occurs when an air mass is forced from a low elevation to a higher elevation as it moves over rising terrain. Orography is the study of the topographic relief of mountains. As the air mass gains altitude it quickly cools down adiabatically, which can raise the relative humidity to 100% and create clouds and, under the right conditions, precipitation.

Orographic lifting can have a number of effects, including precipitation, rain shadowing, leeward winds, and associated clouds.

== Precipitation ==
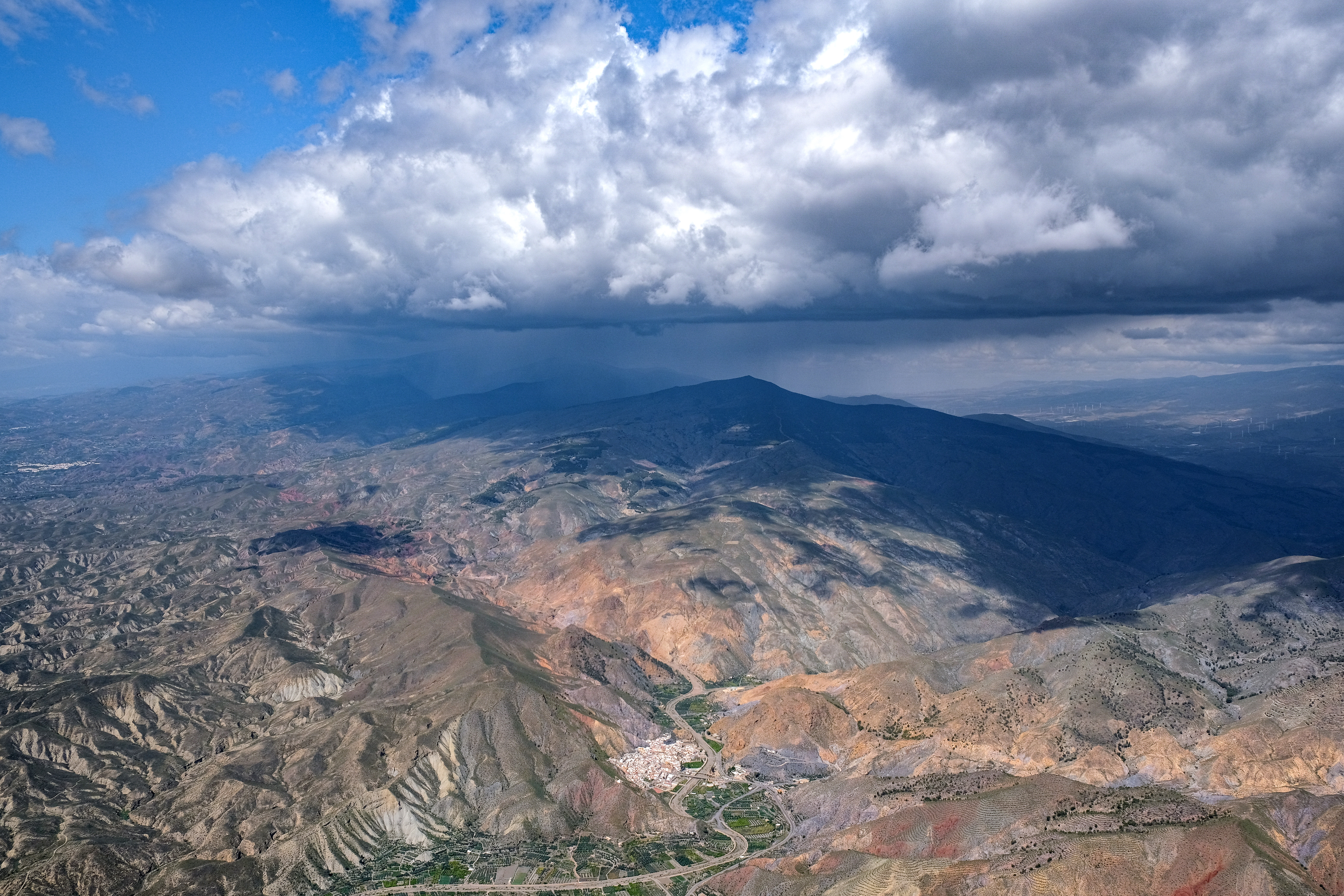
Precipitation induced by orographic lift in Andalusia.

Precipitation induced by orographic lift occurs in many places throughout the world. Examples include:

- The Sierra Madre mountain range in the Philippines, also known as "The backbone of Luzon" or "The great wall of Luzon" The Mogollon Rim in central Arizona
- The western slope of the Sierra Nevada range in California.
- The western slope of the Wasatch Range in Utah. Specifically the Little and Big Cottonwood Canyons.
- The mountains near Baja California North – specifically La Bocana to Laguna Hanson.
- The windward slopes of Khasi and Jayantia Hills (see Mawsynram) in the state of Meghalaya in India.
- The Western Highlands of Yemen, which receive by far the most rain in Arabia.
- The Western Ghats that run along India's western coast.
- The northern slopes of the Pontides leading to the Black Sea, in Bulgaria, Turkey and Georgia.
- The Great Dividing Range of Eastern and South Eastern Australia which forces cold, moist westerlies up the inland slopes, originating from the Southern Ocean.
- The mountains of New Zealand, which face a prevailing westerly flow off the Tasman Sea.
- The mountains of western Tasmania which also face a prevailing westerly flow.
- The southern Andes, which face a prevailing westerly flow off the Pacific Ocean.
- The mountains of the Chocó Department in Colombia, which face a prevailing westerly flow off the Pacific Ocean and are one of the wettest places on Earth.
- The western uplands of Great Britain, including the Grampian Mountains, Lake District, Snowdonia, Brecon Beacons and Dartmoor which face a prevailing westerly flow off the Atlantic Ocean.
- The Northwestern United States and Canada (Oregon, Washington, British Columbia, and Southern Alaska) see prevailing westerly flow off the northern Pacific Ocean. Places on the sea-facing side of coastal mountains see in excess of 140 inches (over 3.5 m) of precipitation per year. These locales are on the mountain sides in the path of storm systems, and therefore receive the moisture which is effectively squeezed from the clouds.

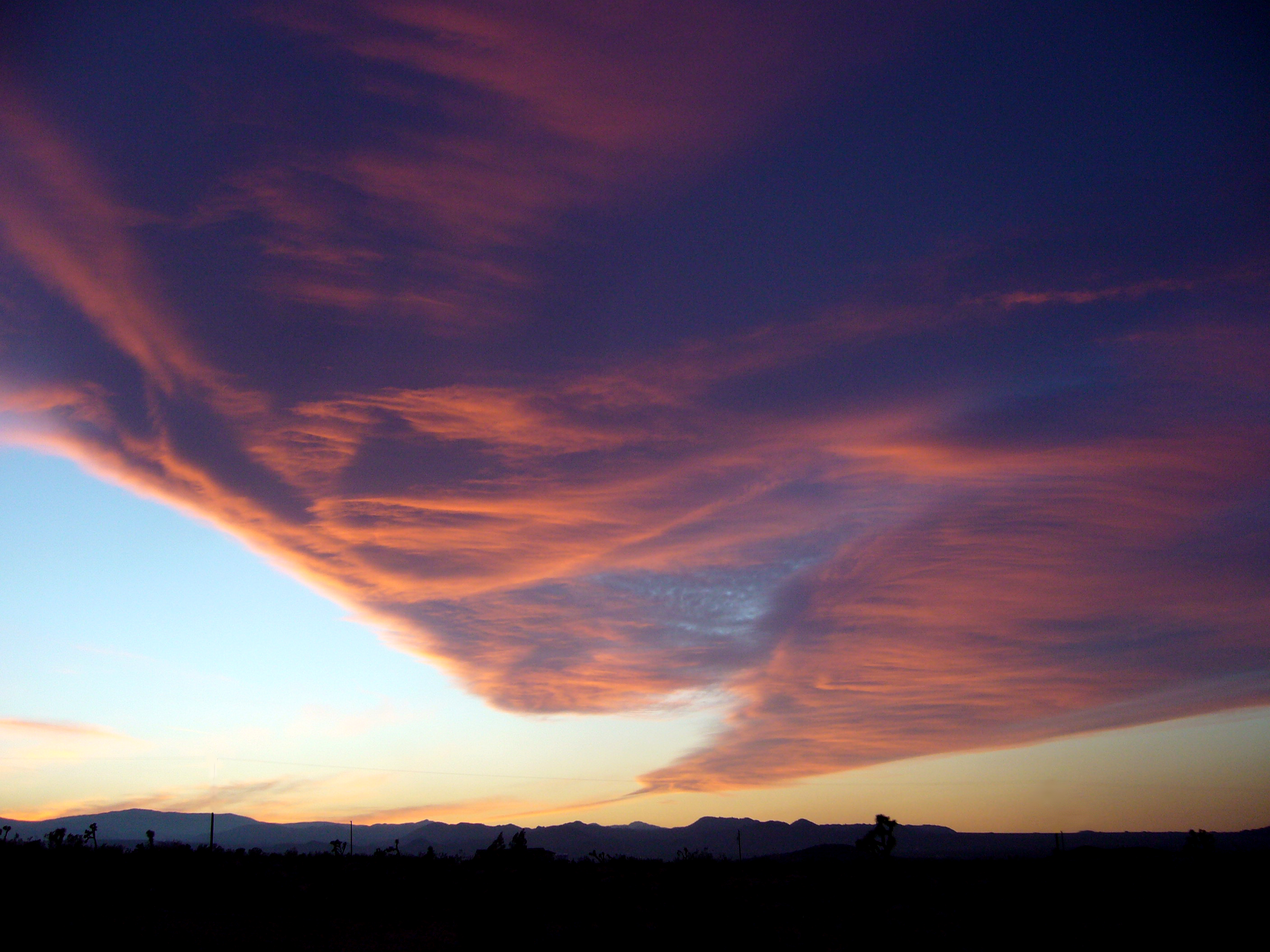
Windy evening twilight enhanced by the Sun's angle, can visually mimic a tornado resulting from orographic lift

- The ski country region of New York and Pennsylvania, particularly with lake effect snows.
- Transylvania County, North Carolina, which gets the most rainfall of anywhere in the Eastern U.S. (90 inches [2,300 mm]).
- The Appalachian Mountains in West Virginia (particularly the western facing slopes).
- The Eastern seaboard of Madagascar.
- Table Mountain, Cape Town, South Africa. The cold Atlantic air mass flows up over the northwestern face to 3,500 feet (1,100 m) above sea level and is met by the warm Indian Ocean air mass from the south eastern back side of the mountain forming the famous "Table Cloth".
- Oppland mountain area, Norway.
- In Colorado west of Denver maximum snowfall is recorded at relatively low elevations, around Idaho Springs, Genesee, Evergreen, and even as low as Golden and Castle Rock.

== Rain shadowing ==
The highest precipitation amounts are found slightly upwind from the prevailing winds at the crests of mountain ranges, where they relieve and therefore the upward lifting is greatest. As the air descends the lee side of the mountain, it warms and dries, creating a rain shadow. On the lee side of the mountains, sometimes as little as 15 miles (25 km) away from high precipitation zones, annual precipitation can be as low as 8 inches (200 mm) per year. This sharp decrease in moisture is caused by adiabatic warming, which inhibits condensation and thus enhances the rain shadow effect.

Areas where this effect is observed include:

- The Himalayas block moisture from the Tibetan Plateau
- The Atacama Desert in Chile
- The Argentine side of Patagonia, or southern Argentina
- Switzerland's Rhone valley
- Areas east of the Cascade Range in the Pacific Northwest (Washington and Oregon)
- Areas east of the Olympic Mountains in Washington state, (i.e. Sequim, Washington)
- The Great Basin of the United States, east of the Sierra Nevada
- Geography of the United States Pacific Mountain System
- Pacific Cordillera
- California's Central Valley
- The Canadian Prairies
- The leeward sides of the Hawaiian Islands. The entire island of Kaho'olawe is in the rain shadow of Maui
- North East England is in the eastern rain shadow of the Pennines, due to Britain's prevailing wind coming from the South West. This explains the significant differences between the rainfall between North West and North East England. This impact also occurs to varying degrees to the east of the Grampian Mountains, in Herefordshire and along the England Wales borders and in Devon to the east of Dartmoor.
- The Central Coast, Cumberland Plain, Illawarra, Monaro and the South Coast regions in Southeastern Australia in New South Wales; as snow-bearing westerlies arriving from the southwest (the Great Australian Bight) and up the ranges are forced upwind the inland slopes of the Great Dividing Range, the coastal plain remains dry and is significantly warmer than on the inland slopes at equivalent altitudes. This is evident when comparing Batlow on the windward slopes to Cooma on the leeward coastal plain, both around 800 metres (2,600 ft). Conversely, if the polar front or rain event arrives from the south-east (the Tasman Sea), then the coastal plain will be on the windward side and the inland slopes are on the leeward side.
- The Judean Desert in the Land of Israel and the Dead Sea.
- The Southern Alps of New Zealand

== Leeward winds ==
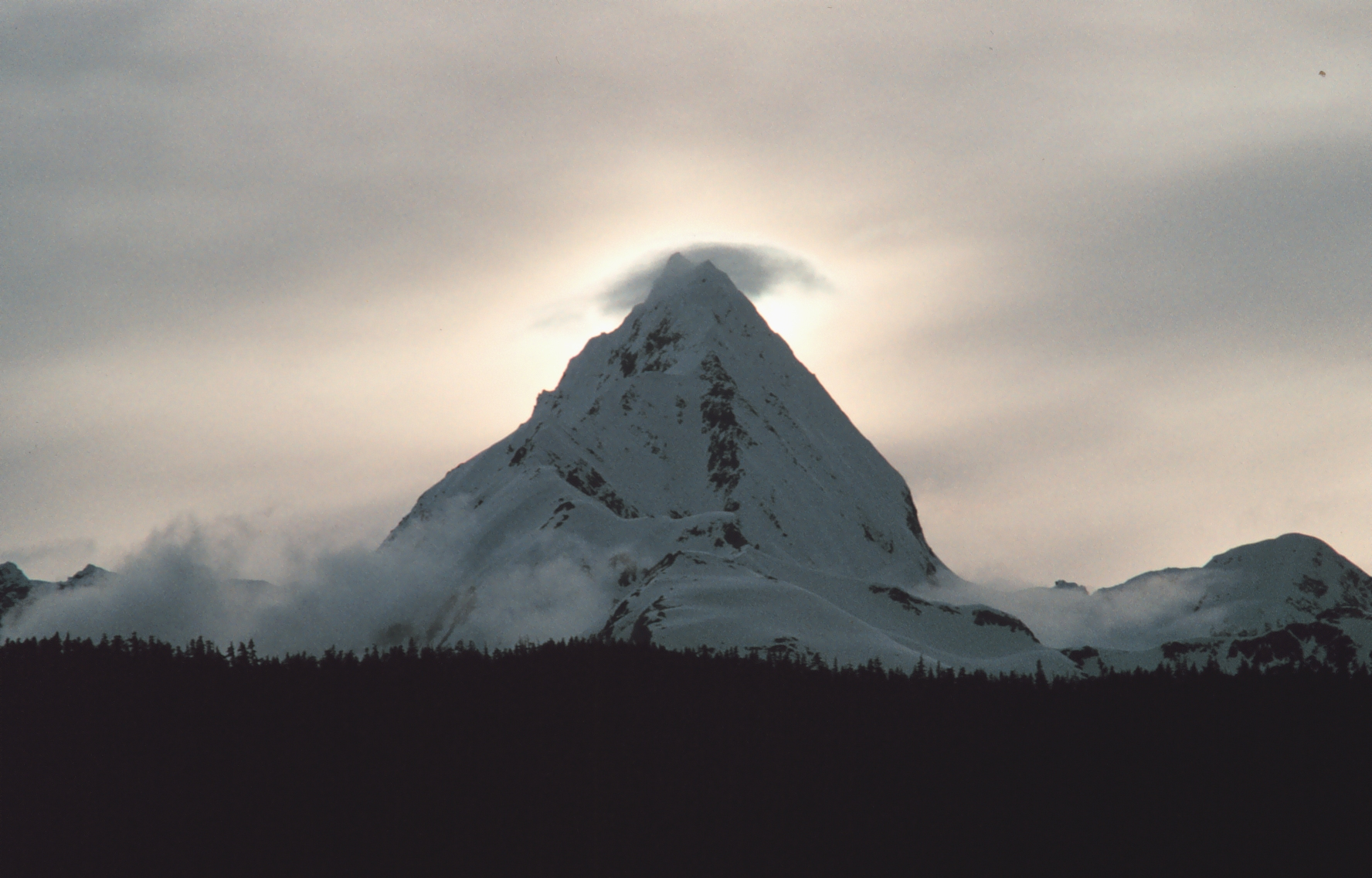
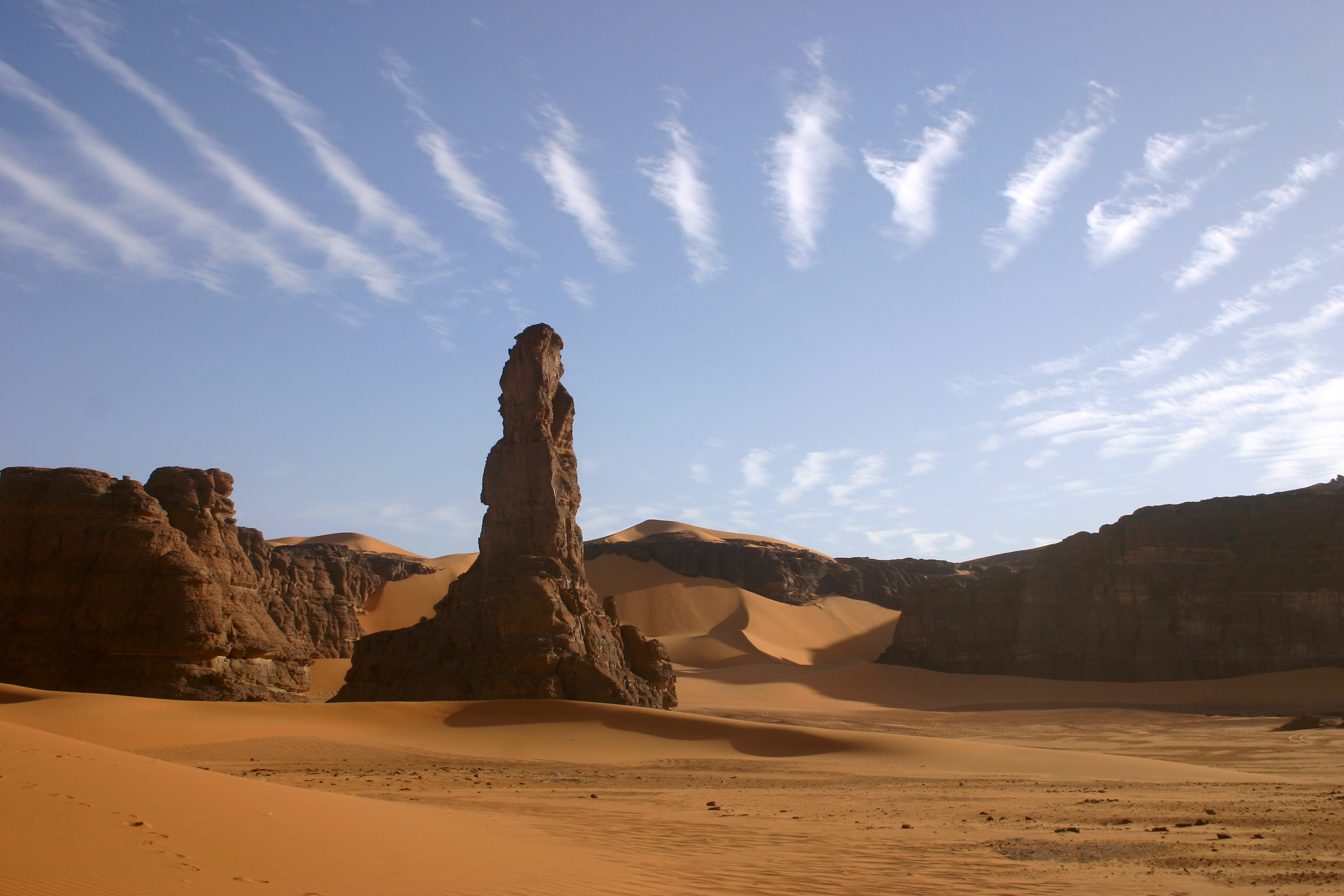
A cap cloud (left) and wave clouds

Downslope winds occur on the leeward side of mountain barriers when a stable air mass is carried over the mountain by strong winds that increase in strength with height. Moisture is removed and latent heat released as the air mass is orographically lifted. As the air mass descends, it is compression heated. The warm foehn wind, locally known as the Chinook wind, Bergwind or Diablo wind or Nor'wester depending on the region, provide examples of this type of wind, and are driven in part by latent heat released by orographic-lifting-induced precipitation.

A similar class of winds, the Sirocco, the Bora and Santa Ana winds, are examples where orographic lifting has limited effect since there is limited moisture to remove in the Saharan or other air masses; the Sirocco, Bora and Santa Ana are driven primarily by (adiabatic) compression heating.

== Associated clouds ==
As air flows over mountain barriers, orographic lift can create a variety of cloud effects.

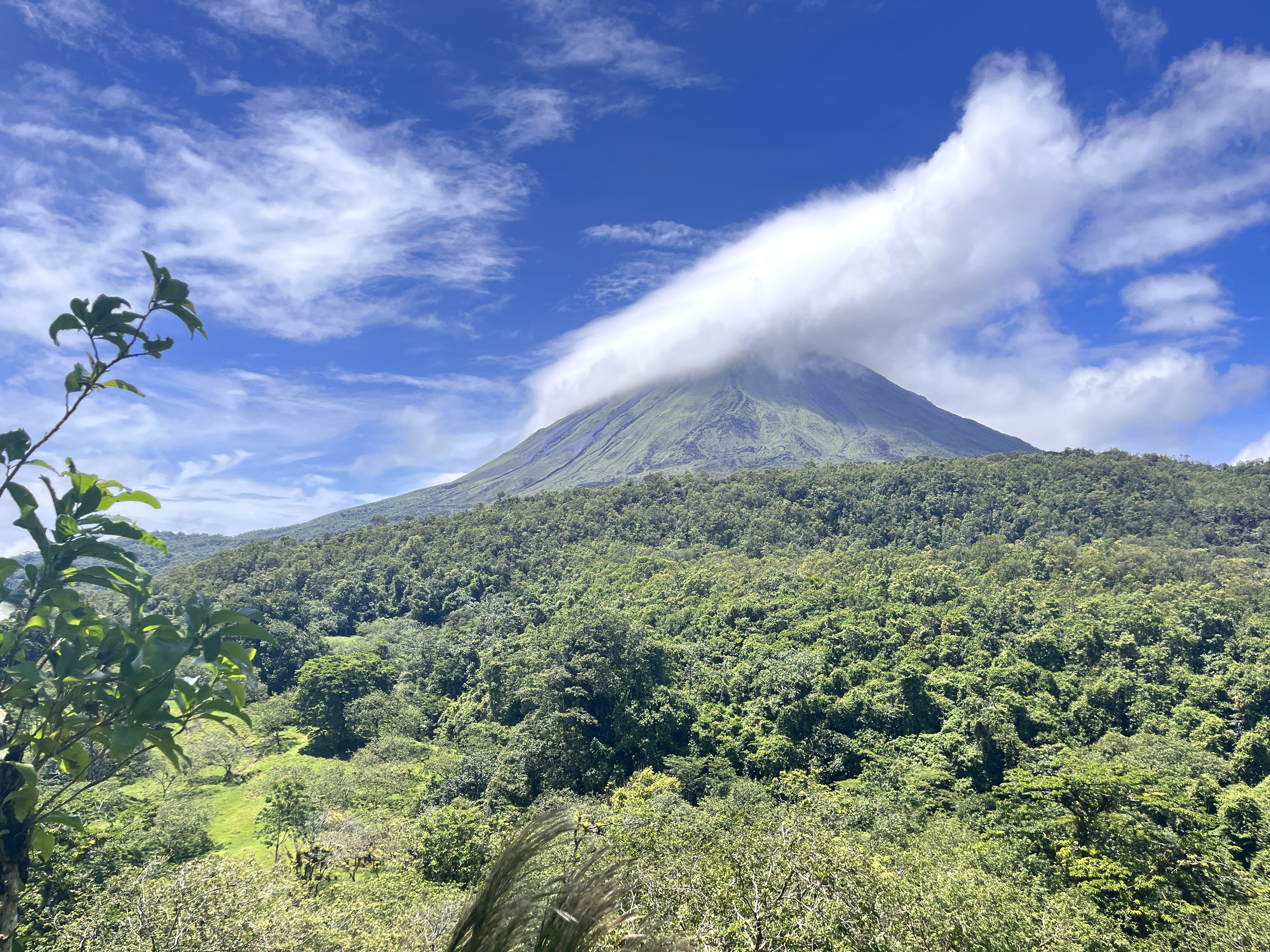
- Lenticular cloud over Arenal Volcano
  Orographic fog is formed as the air rises up the slope and will often envelope the summit. When the air is humid, some of the moisture will fall on the windward slope and on the summit of the mountain.
- When wind is strong, a banner cloud is formed downwind of the upper slopes of isolated, steep-sided mountains. It is created by the low pressure areas in the downwind vortices drawing in relatively humid air from the lower slopes of the mountain. This reduction in pressure compared to the surrounding air increases condensation, in the same manner as an aircraft's wingtip vortices. The most famous such cloud forms routinely in the lee of the Matterhorn.
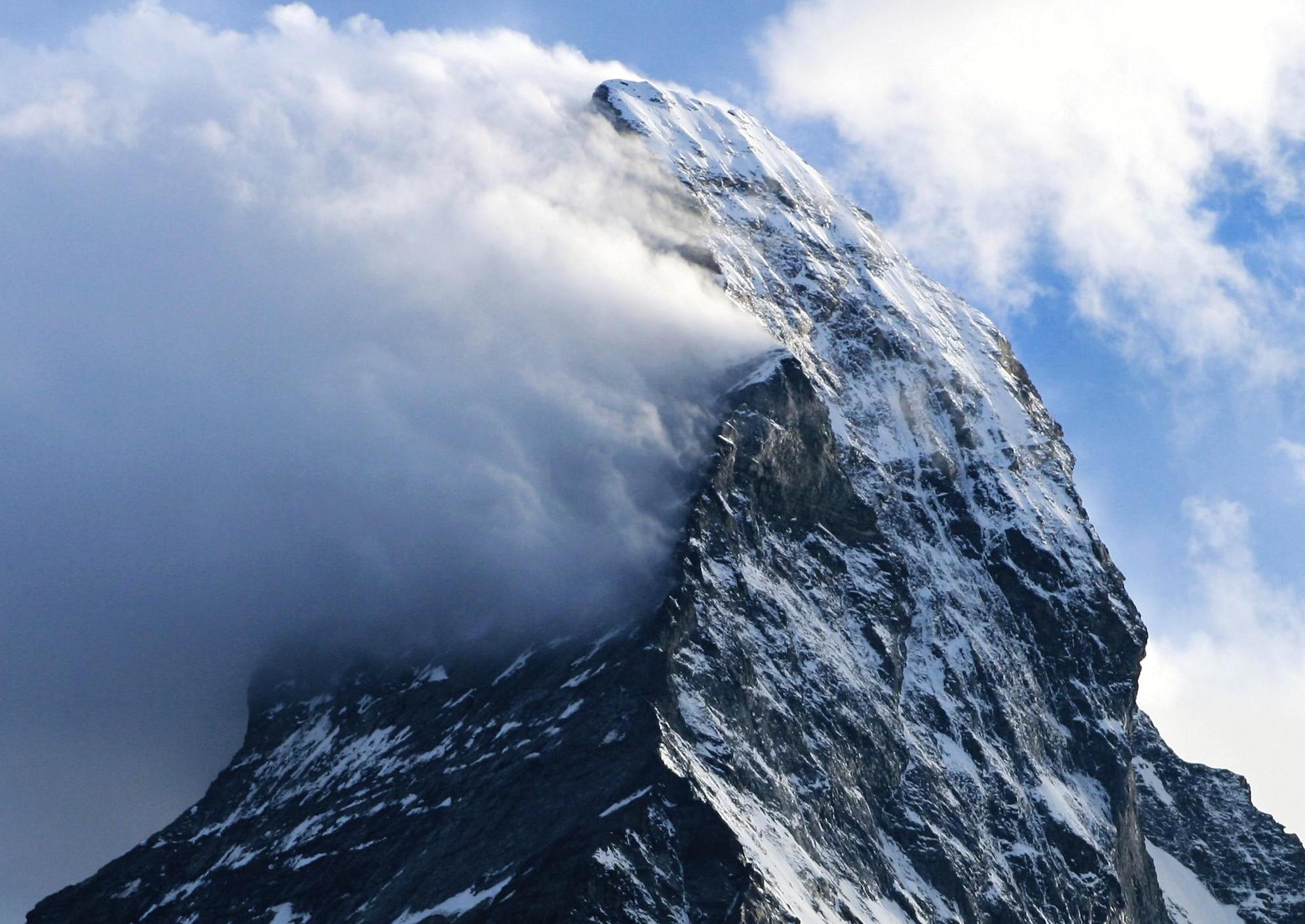
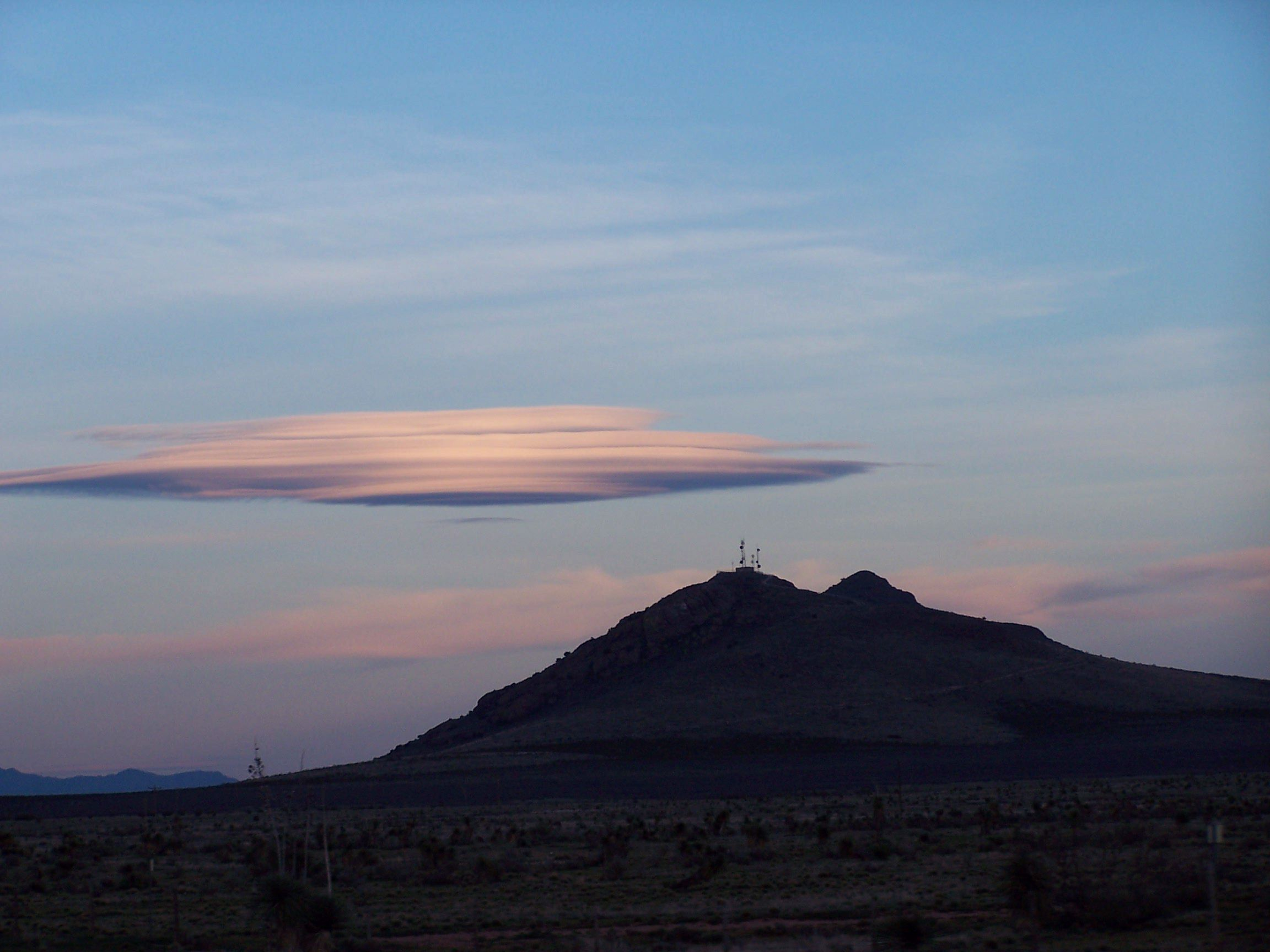
Banner cloud formation on the Matterhorn (left) and a lenticular cloud in New Mexico
- The leeward edge of an extensive mass of orographic clouds may be quite distinct. On the leeward side of the mountain, the air flowing downward is known as a foehn wind. Because some of the moisture that has condensed on the top of the mountain has precipitated, the foehn (or föhn) is drier, and the lower moisture content causes the descending air mass to warm up more than it had cooled down during ascent. The distinct cut-off line which forms along and parallel to the ridge line is sometimes known as a foehn wall (or föhn wall). This is because the edge appears stationary and it often appears to have an abrupt wall-like edge. A foehn wall is a common feature along the Front Range of the Colorado Rockies.
- A rotor cloud is sometimes formed downwind and below the level of the ridge. It has the appearance of the ragged cumulus cloud type but it is caused by a turbulent horizontal vortex, i.e. the air is very rough.
- Lenticular clouds are stationary lens-shaped clouds that are formed downwind of mountains by lee waves if the air mass is close to the dew point. They are normally aligned at right-angles to the wind direction and are formed at altitudes up to 12,000 metres (39,370 ft).
- A cap cloud is a special form of the lenticular cloud with a base low enough that it forms around and covers the peak, capping it.
- A chinook arch cloud is an extensive wave cloud. It has this special name in North America where it is associated with the Chinook wind. It forms above the mountain range, usually at the beginning of a chinook wind as a result of orographic lifting over the range. It appears when seen from downwind to form an arch over the mountain range. A layer of clear air separates it from the mountain.
- The longest orographic cloud known in the Solar System appears in summer mornings near Arsia Mons on Mars. It reaches length of 1800 km.

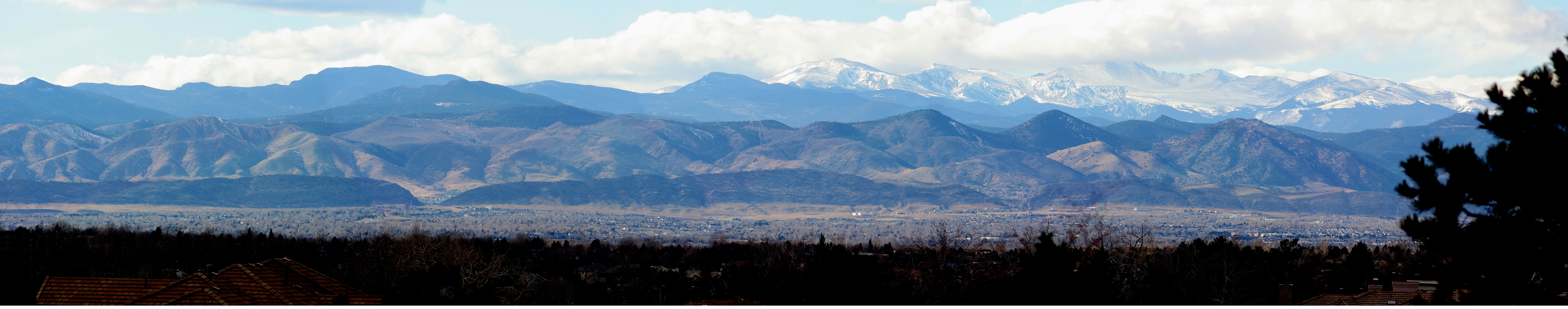
A view of the Front Range of the Rockies capped by a föhn wall.

== See also ==
- Atmospheric convection
- Weather front
- Lake-effect rain
