= Altocumulus undulatus cloud =

Type of altocumulus cloud

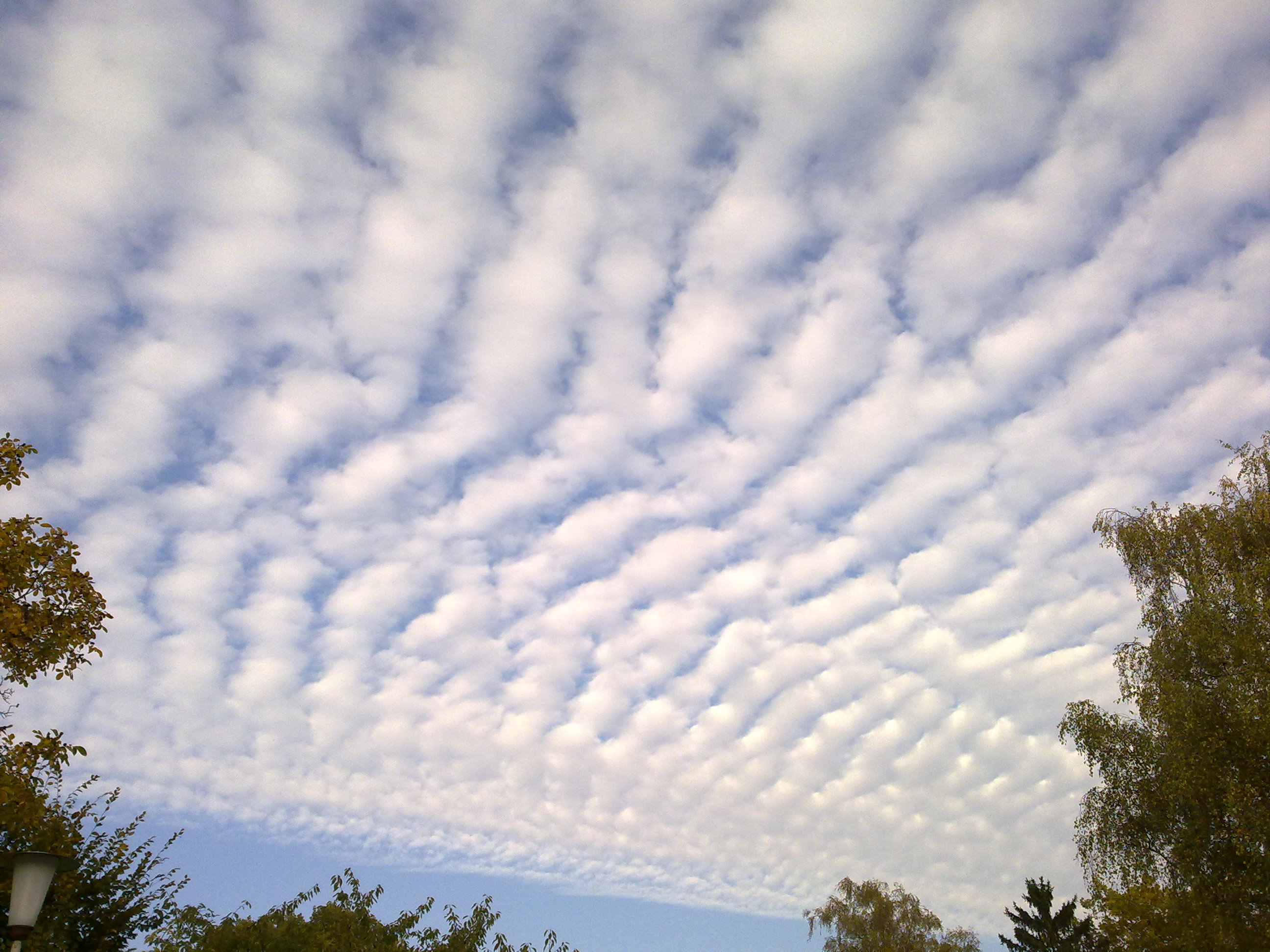
- Altocumulus undulatus clouds
- Abbreviation: Ac
- Genus: Alto- (high) -cumulus (heap)
- Species: undulatus (wavy)
- Altitude: 2,400 - 6,100 m (8,000 - 20,000 ft)
- Appearance: undulated
- Precipitation: No

The altocumulus undulatus is a mid-level cloud (about 8,000–20,000 ft or 2,400–6,100 m), usually white or grey with layers or patches containing undulations that resemble "waves" or "ripples" in water. Elements within the cloud (such as the edges of the undulations) are generally darker than those in cirrocumulus and smaller than those in stratocumulus. These clouds may appear both as patches or as covering the sky. The thickness of these clouds is generally less than 300 feet (91 meters). The presence of altocumulus undulatus may indicate precipitation within the next 20 hours or simply an overcast day.

As with other altocumulus, the undulatus variety can form in all seasons, announcing an approaching system within the general area (about 100 - 200 mi or 160 – 322 km). They result from wind shear (an abrupt speed or directional shifting in the wind, acutely changing with height). Lines one might see indicate the direction of the shear. In the southern United States, these formations may be the result of tropical or subtropical system outflow in a northern direction. They may also come from a southwestern monsoon making its way across the Western United States and Great Plains.

== See also ==
- Weather
- Atmosphere of Earth
- List of cloud types
