= Cirrocumulus undulatus =

Type of cloud

Cirrocumulus undulatus cloud
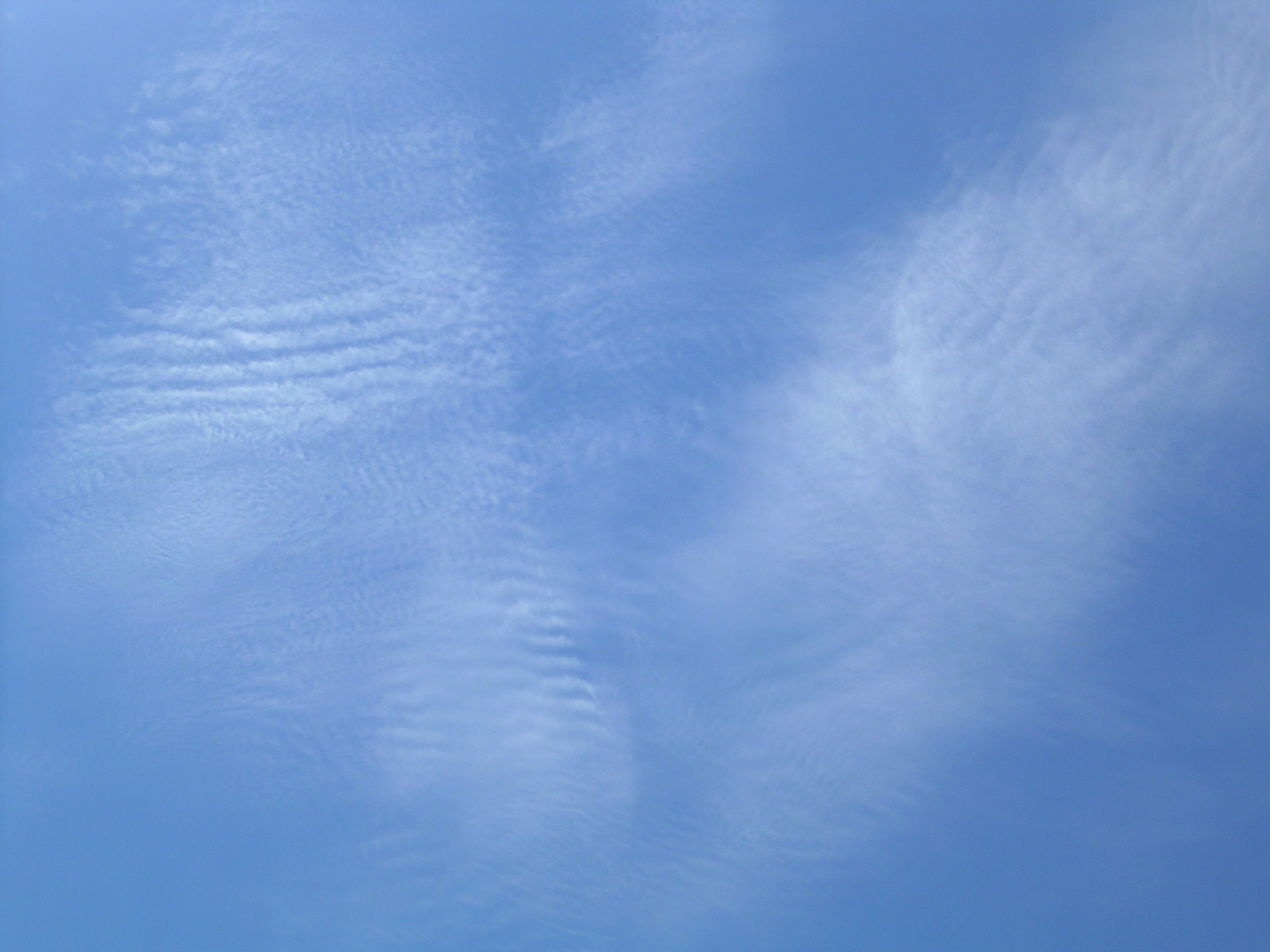
- Cirrocumulus undulatus clouds
- Abbreviation: Cc un
- Genus: Cirrus (curl) -cumulus (heaped)
- Variety: undulatus (undulated)
- Altitude: Above 6,000 m (Above 20,000 ft)
- Appearance: wavy heaps of cloudlets
- Precipitation: Virga only

Cirrocumulus undulatus is a variety of cirrocumulus cloud. The name cirrocumulus undulatus is derived from Latin, meaning "diversified as with waves". They have a rippled appearance due to wind shear and usually cover only a small portion of the sky. They appear in bands as small patches or layers. Occasionally, they comprise two or more wave forms superposed upon one another. The individual cloudlets can either be circular or elongated in the direction of the rows.

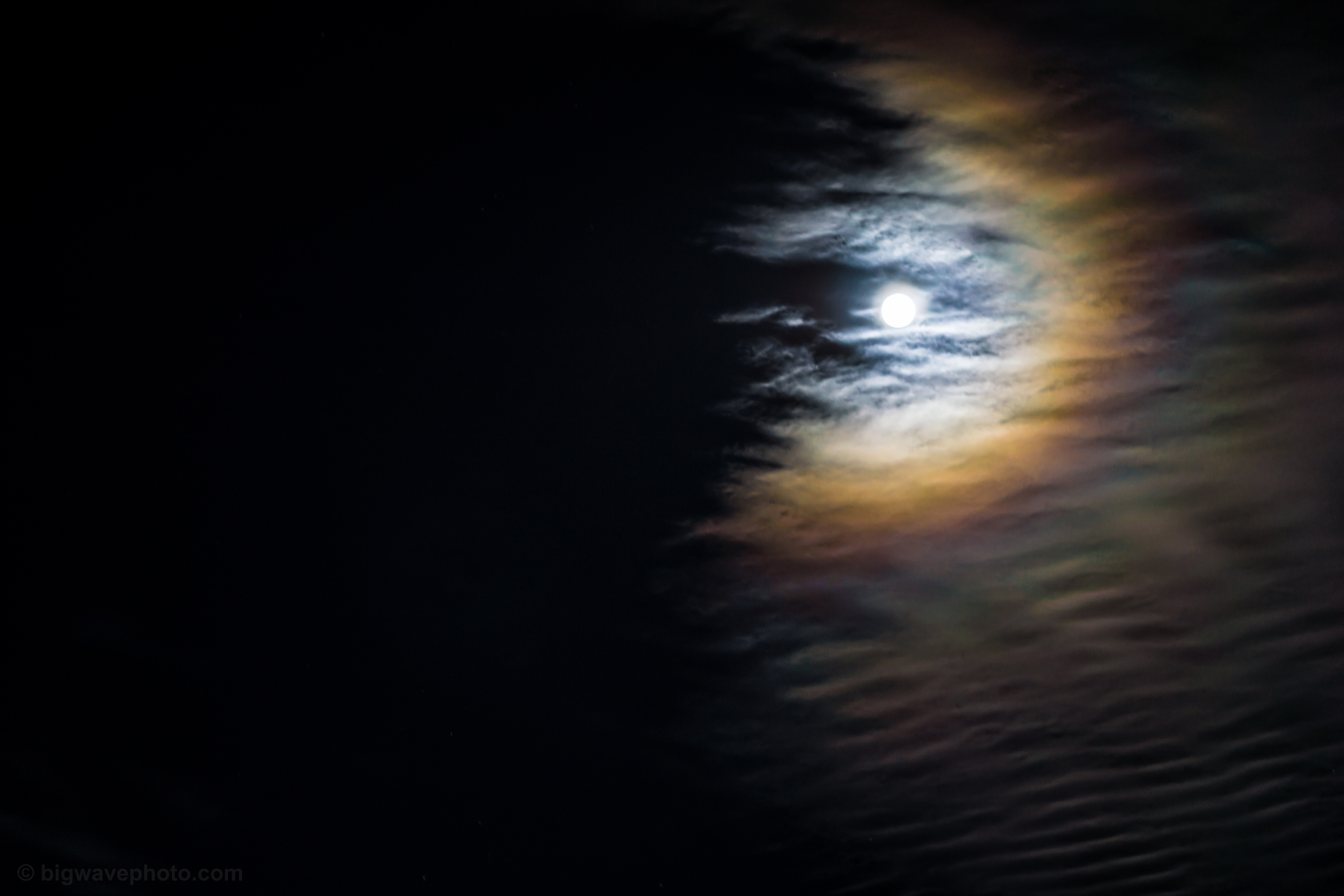
Cirrocumulus undulatus cloud forming a halo around the moon

== See also ==
- List of cloud types
