= Cirrocumulus lenticularis =

Type of cloud

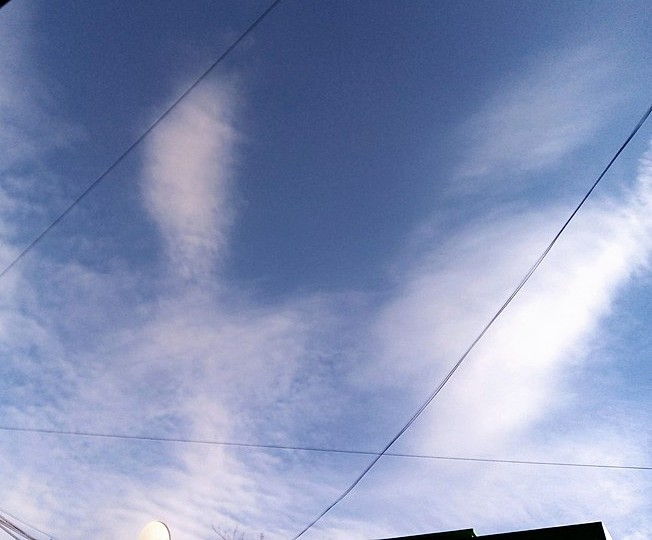
- Cirrocumulus lenticularis clouds, during a cold front
- Abbreviation: Cc len
- Genus: Cirro- (curl) -cumulus (heaped)
- Species: lenticularis (lens-shaped)
- Altitude: Above 6,000 m (Above 20,000 ft)
- Classification: Family A (High-level)
- Appearance: lens- or almond-shaped
- Precipitation: Virga only

Cirrocumulus lenticularis is a type of cirrocumulus cloud. The name cirrocumulus lenticularis is derived from Latin, meaning "like a lentil". Cirrocumulus lenticularis are smooth clouds that have the appearance of a lens or an almond. They usually form at the crests of atmospheric waves, which would otherwise be invisible. This species of cirrocumulus can often be quite elongated and normally has very distinguished boundaries. Cirrocumulus lenticularis forms when stable air is forced upward; this is usually due to orographic features, but can occur away from mountains as well. Irisation can occasionally occur with these clouds.

== See also ==
- Altocumulus lenticularis
- Stratocumulus lenticularis
- List of cloud types
