= Cirrocumulus floccus =

Type of cloud

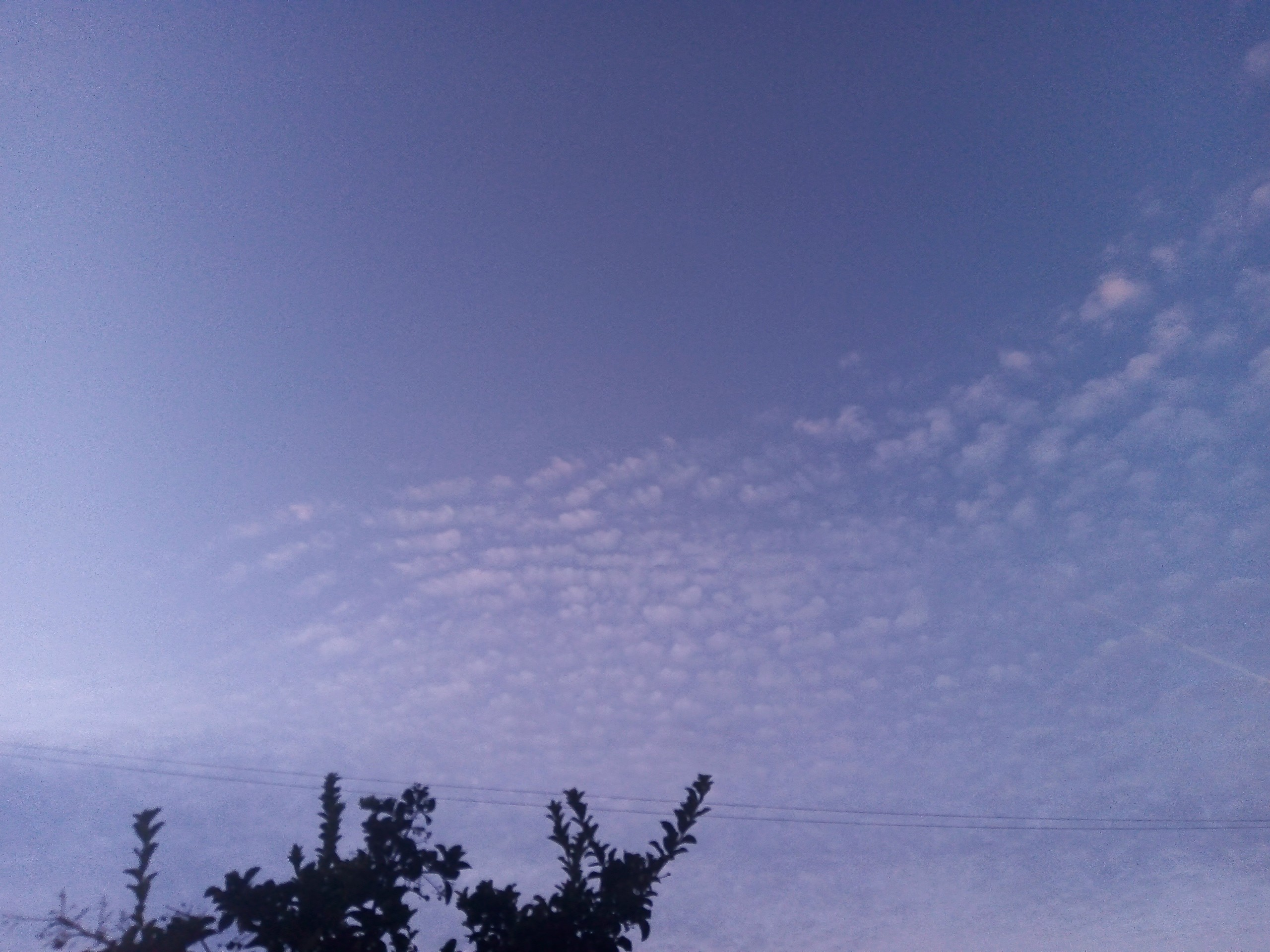
- Cirrocumulus floccus clouds
- Abbreviation: Cc flo
- Genus: Cirro- (curl) -cumulus (heaped)
- Species: floccus (lock of wool)
- Altitude: Above 6,000 m (Above 20,000 ft)
- Classification: Family A (High-level)
- Appearance: small tufts
- Precipitation: Occasionally virga

Cirrocumulus floccus is a type of cirrocumulus cloud. The name cirrocumulus floccus is derived from Latin, meaning "a lock of wool". Cirrocumulus floccus appears as small tufts of cloud with rounded heads, but ragged bottoms. The cloud can produce virga, precipitation that evaporates before reaching the ground. Like cirrocumulus castellanus, cirrocumulus floccus is an indicator of atmospheric instability at the level of the cloud. In fact, cirrocumulus floccus can form from cirrocumulus castellanus, being the evolutionary state after the base of the original cloud has dissipated.

== See also ==
- List of cloud types
