= Lenticular cloud =

Stationary lentil-shaped cloud

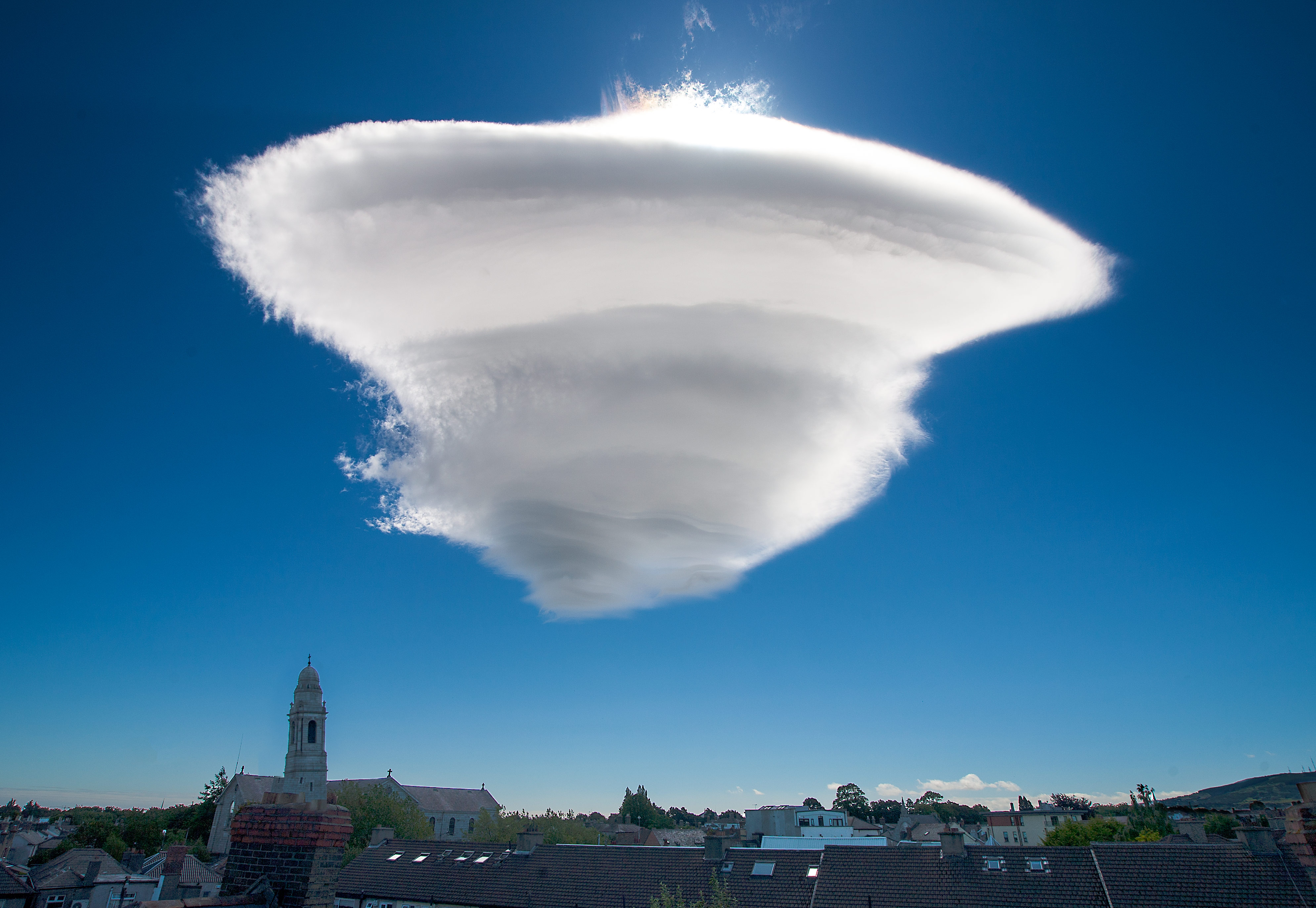
- Dramatic lenticular cloud formation over Harold's Cross, Dublin
- Genus: Stratocumulus, altocumulus, cirrocumulus
- Species: Lenticularis (Latin: lentil)
- Altitude: up to 12,000 m (40,000 ft)
- Appearance: Lens-like, saucer-shaped
- Precipitation: Virga only

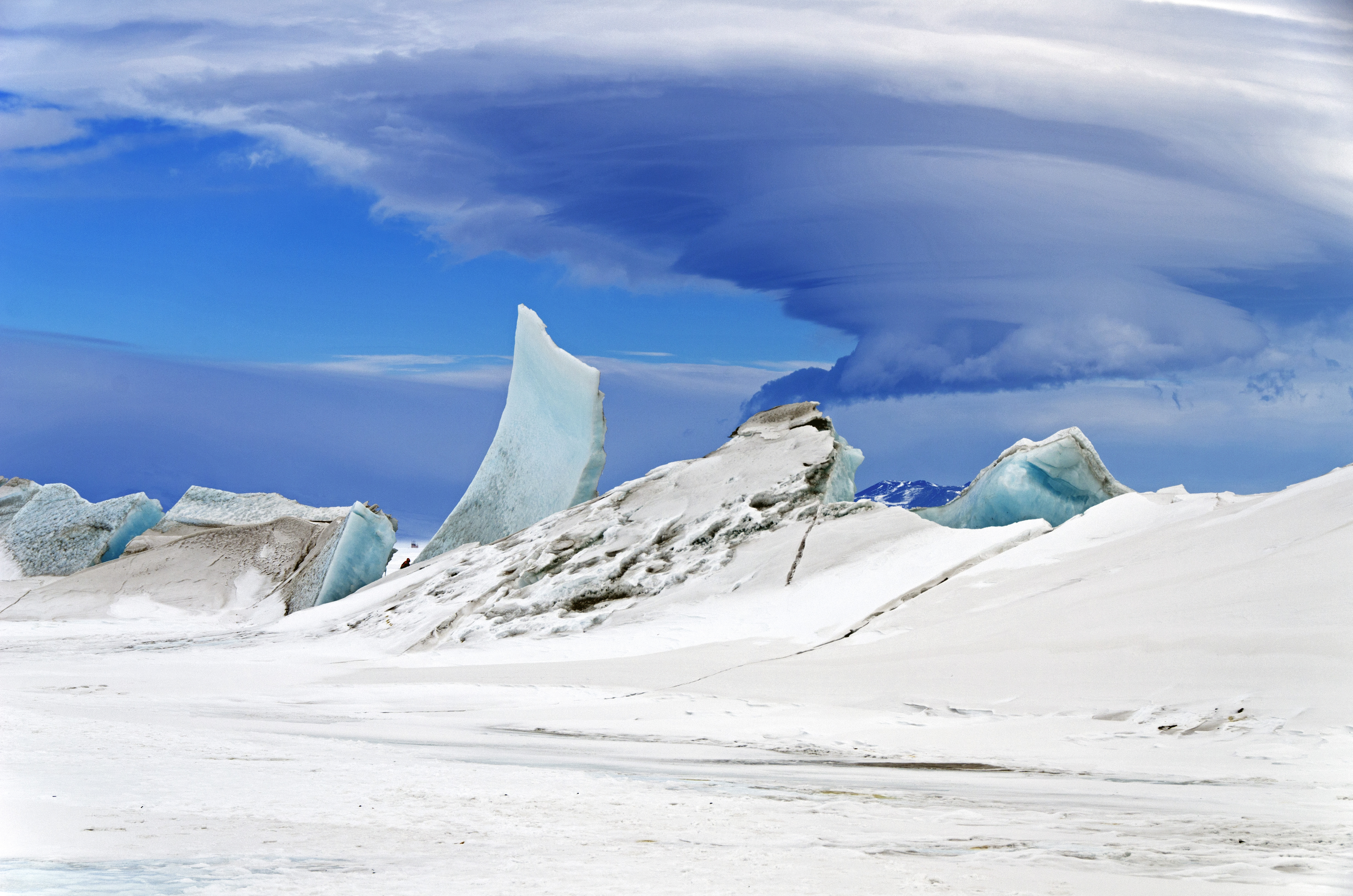
Lenticular cloud over the Antarctic ice near Scott Base

Lenticular clouds (from Latin lenticularis 'lentil-shaped', from lenticula 'lentil') are stationary clouds that form mostly in the troposphere, typically in parallel alignment to the wind direction. They are often comparable in appearance to a lens or saucer. Nacreous clouds that form in the lower stratosphere sometimes have lenticular shapes.

There are three main types of lenticular clouds: altocumulus standing lenticular (ACSL), stratocumulus standing lenticular (SCSL), and cirrocumulus standing lenticular (CCSL), varying in altitude above the ground.

== Formation and appearance ==
Time-lapse recording of a lenticular cloud

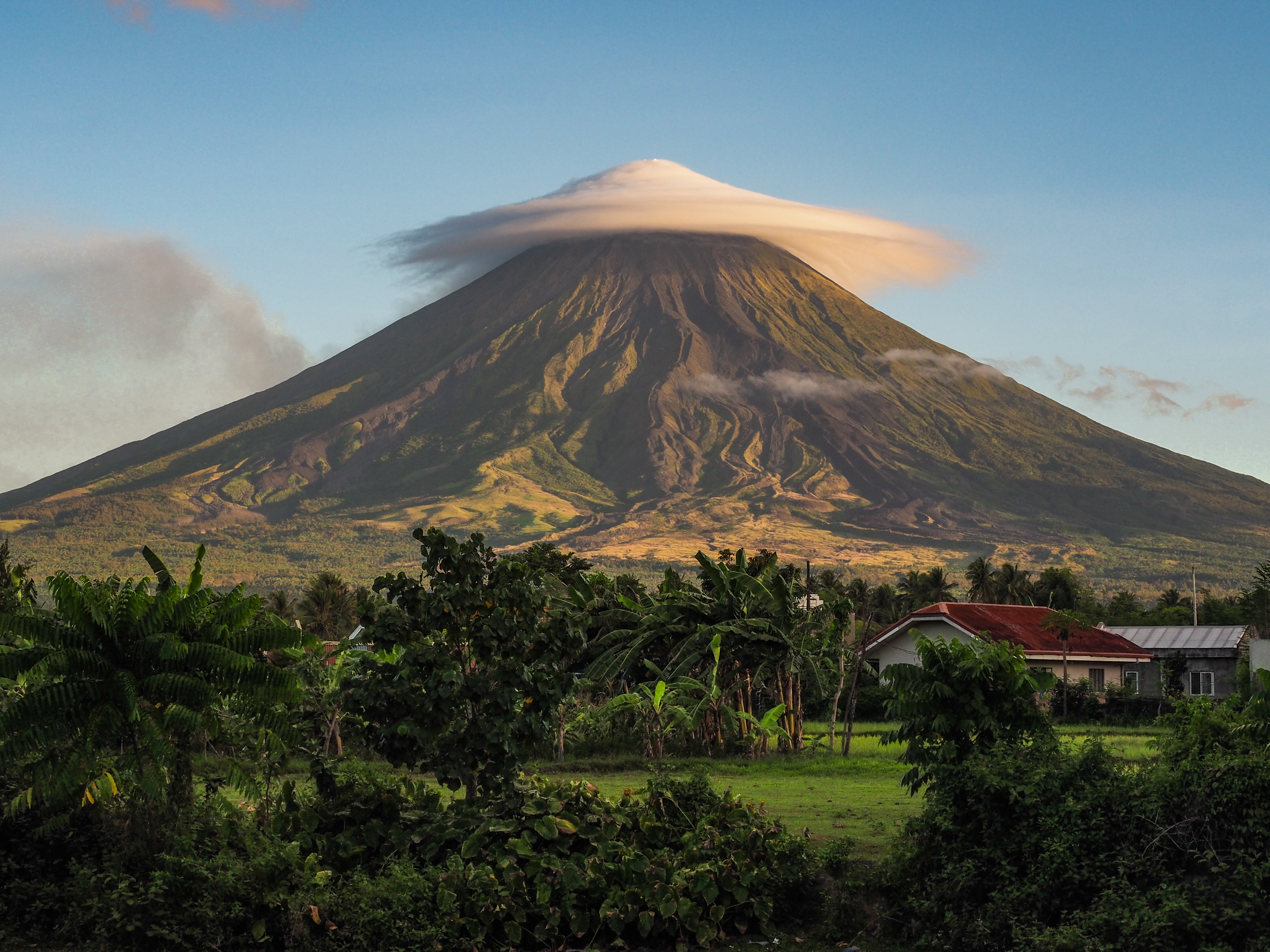
A lenticular cloud covers the summit crater of Mayon Volcano, Philippines.

As air travels along the surface of the Earth, it often encounters obstructions, including natural features, such as mountains or hills, and artificial structures, such as buildings and other constructions, which disrupt the flow of air into "currents", or areas of turbulence. (Note: Lenticular clouds have also formed as a result of shear winds created by a front.)

When moist, stable air flows over a larger eddy, such as those caused by mountains, a series of large-scale standing waves form on the leeward side of the mountain. If the temperature at the crest of the wave drops below the dew point, moisture in the air may condense to form lenticular clouds. Under certain conditions, long strings of lenticular clouds may form near the crest of each successive wave, creating a formation known as a "wave cloud". Those wave systems can produce large updrafts, occasionally enough for water vapour to condense and produce precipitation.

Lenticular clouds have been mistaken for UFOs, because many of them have the shape of a "flying saucer", with a characteristic "lens" or smooth, saucer-like shape. Lenticular clouds generally do not form over low-lying or flat terrain, so many people may have never seen one and don't know that they can exist. Bright colours (called iridescence) are sometimes seen along the edge of lenticular clouds.

== Flight ==
Pilots of powered aircraft tend to avoid flying near lenticular clouds because of the turbulence and sinking air at their trailing edge, but glider pilots actively seek them out in order to climb in the upward-moving air at the leading edge. The clouds' orientation precisely locates the rising air mass. "Wave lift" of this kind is often smooth and strong, and enables gliders to soar to remarkable altitudes and to cover great distances. As of 2020, the gliding world records for both distance (over 3,000 km; 1,864 mi) and absolute altitude (over 22,000 metres; 74,334 ft) were set using such lift.

== See also ==
- Cloud Appreciation Society
- Pileus (meteorology), or cap cloud
