= Stratocumulus lenticularis =

Type of cumulus cloud

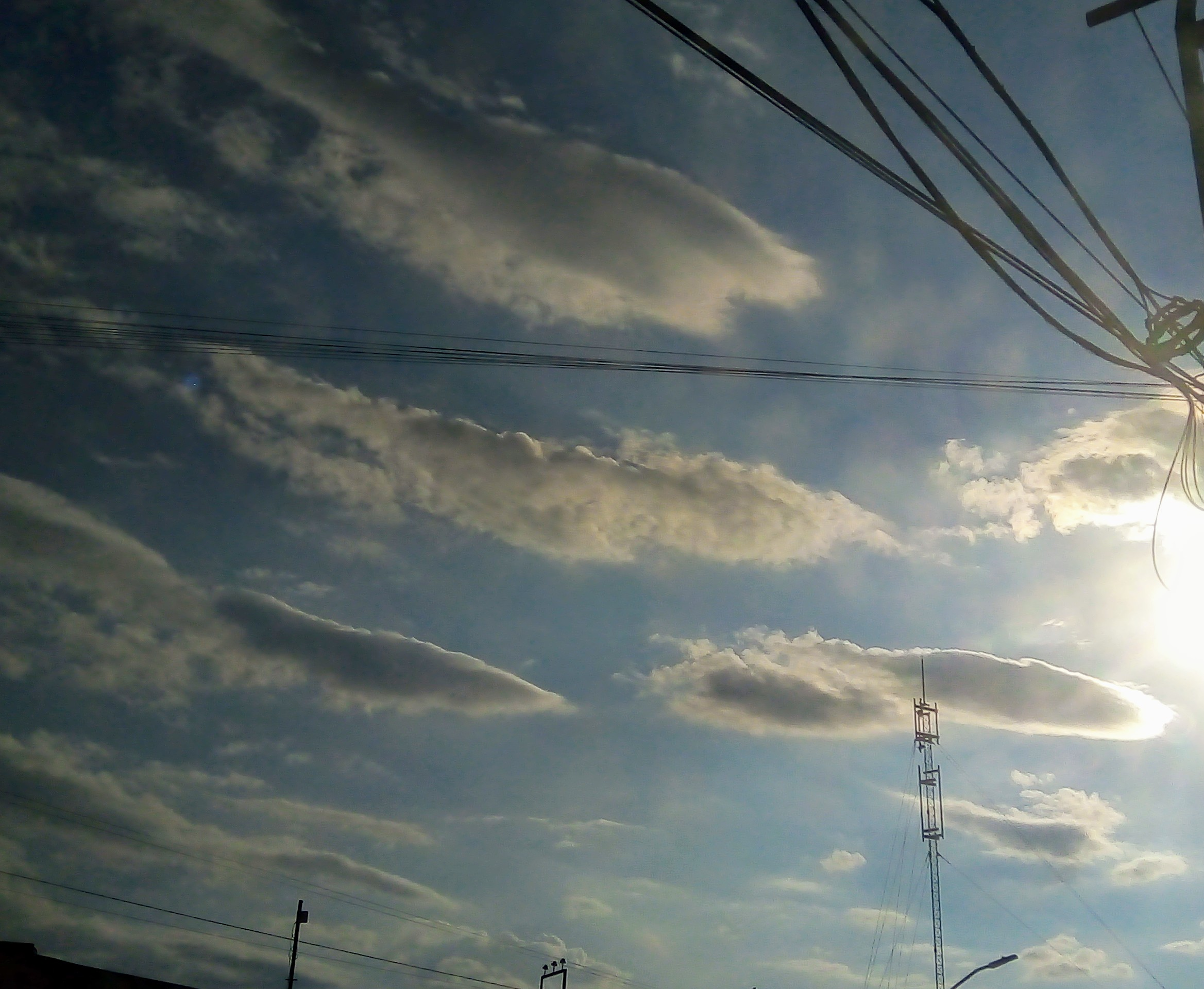
- Stratocumulus lenticularis
- Abbreviation: strt len
- Genus: stratocumulus
- Altitude: 500-2000 m (2000-7000 ft)
- Appearance: Flat stratocumuliform lens or almond

Stratocumulus lenticularis is an uncommon cloud species that belongs to the stratocumulus cloud type, its appearance is that of a flat lens or almond. It forms as a result of atmospheric waves caused by wind passing over obstacles; for example, a mountain or a building. They are more common in locations that are hilly, or places where foehn winds are common They tend to look more well-defined when a foehn wind is causing their formation. They also sometimes show iridescence. It is a type of lenticular cloud.

== See also ==
- Altocumulus lenticularis
- Cirrocumulus lenticularis
