= Cirrocumulus stratiformis =

Type of cloud

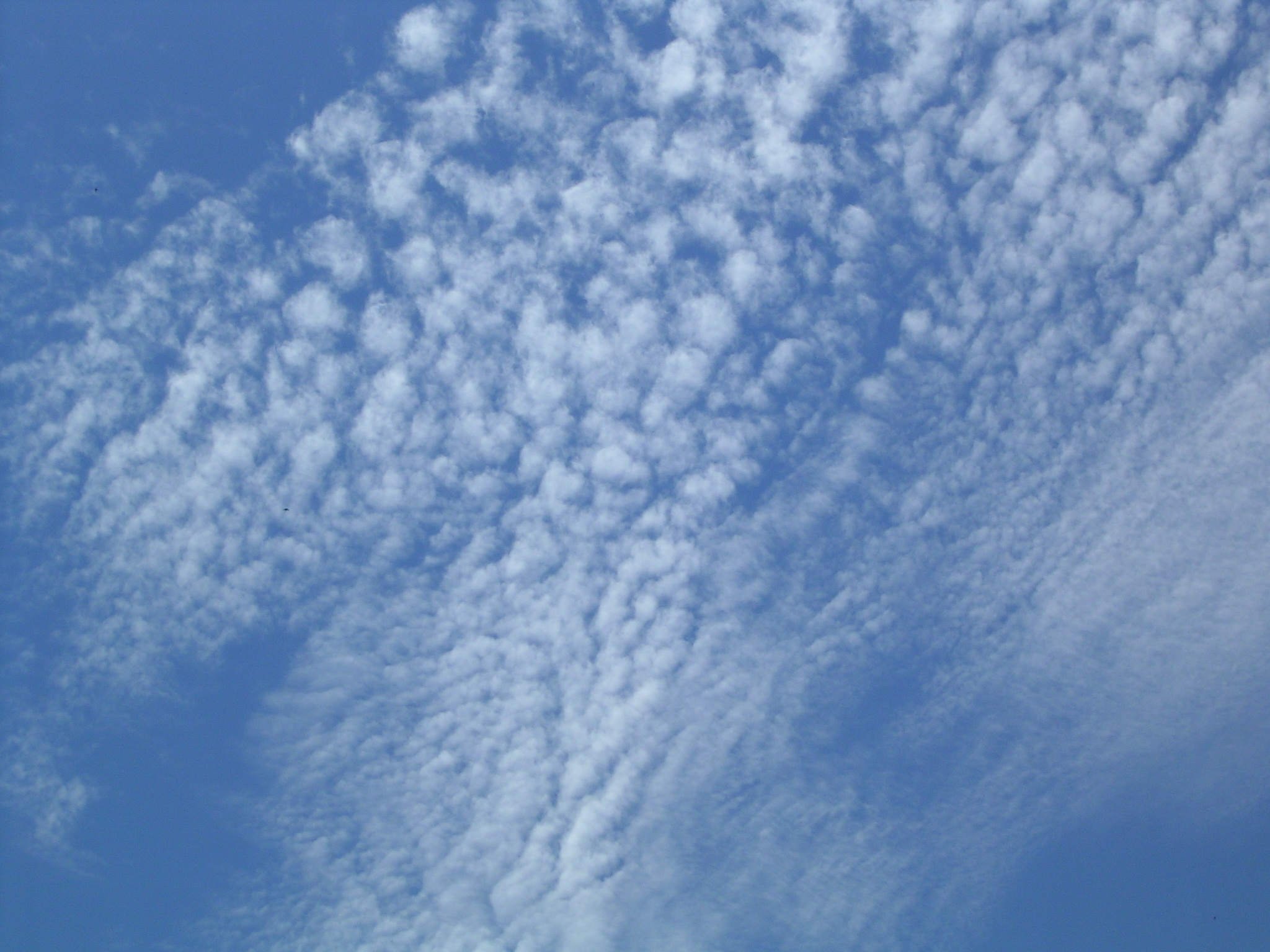
- Layer of cirrocumulus stratiformis clouds
- Abbreviation: Cc str
- Genus: Cirro- (curl) -cumulus (heaped)
- Species: Stratiformis (layer form)
- Altitude: Above 6,000 m (Above 20,000 ft)
- Classification: Family A (High-level)
- Appearance: horizontal layers
- Precipitation: Virga only

Cirrocumulus stratiformis is a type of cirrocumulus cloud. The name cirrocumulus stratiformis is derived from Latin, meaning "stretched out". Cirrocumulus stratiformis occurs as very small cirrocumulus clouds that cover a large part of the sky. This type of cloud always occurs in thin layers. There can be spaces or rifts between the individual cloudlets in the layer.

== See also ==
- List of cloud types
