= Wave cloud =

Type of droplet/crystal mass formed by atmospheric oscillations due to gravity

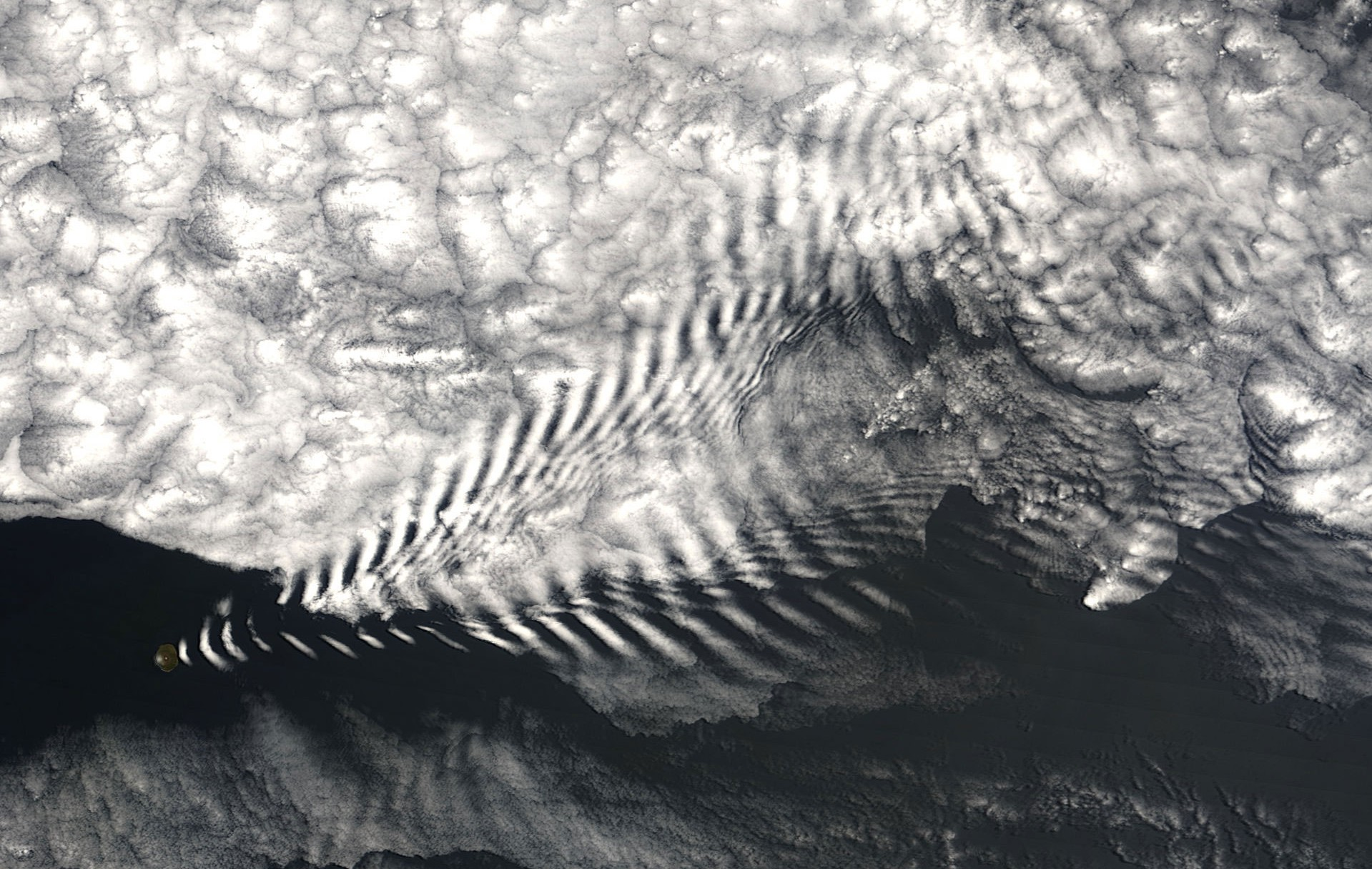
That wave cloud pattern formed over the Île Amsterdam, in the lower left corner at the tip of the triangular formation, in the far southern Indian Ocean.

A wave cloud is a cloud form created by atmospheric internal waves.

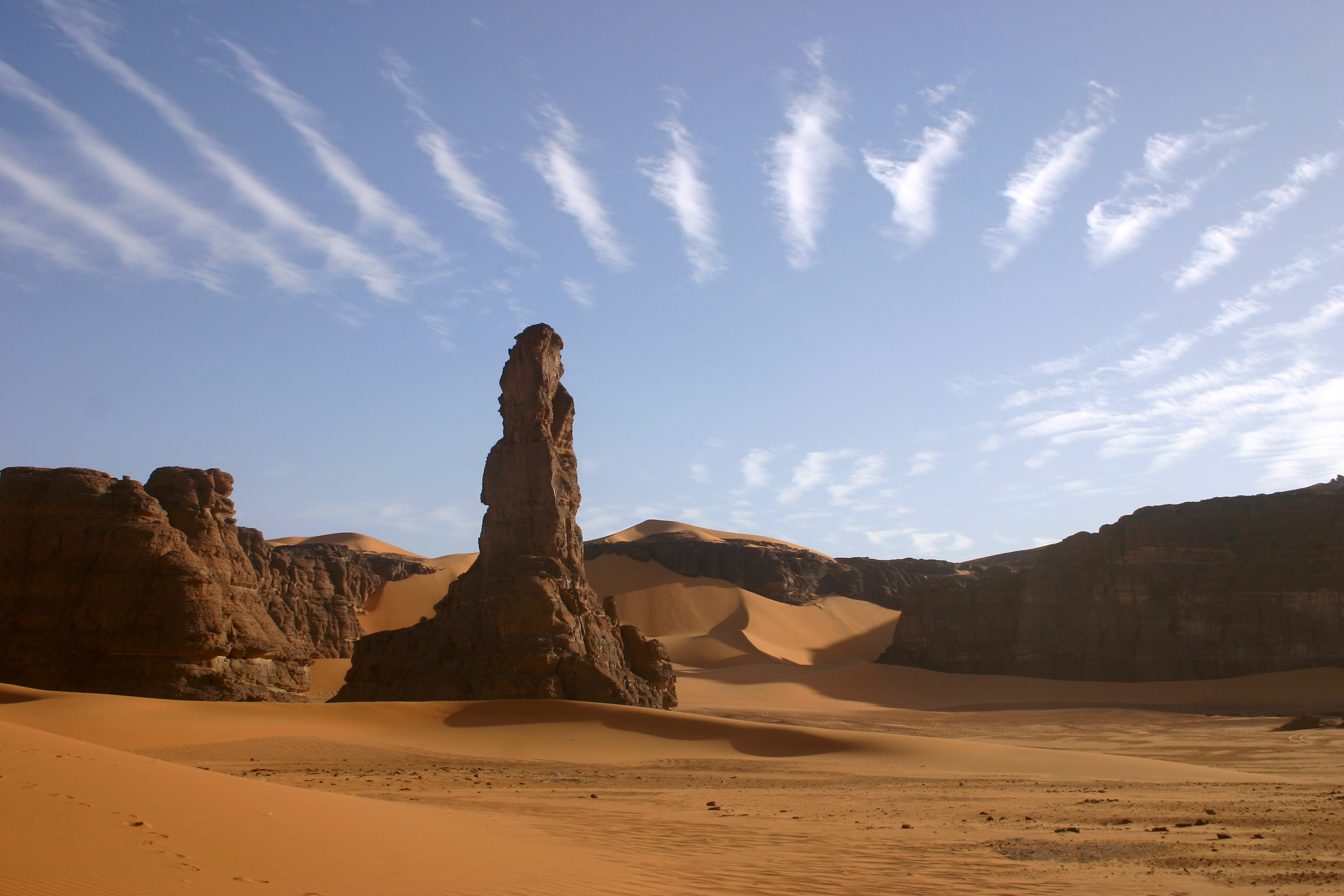
Wave cloud pattern in Tadrart region.

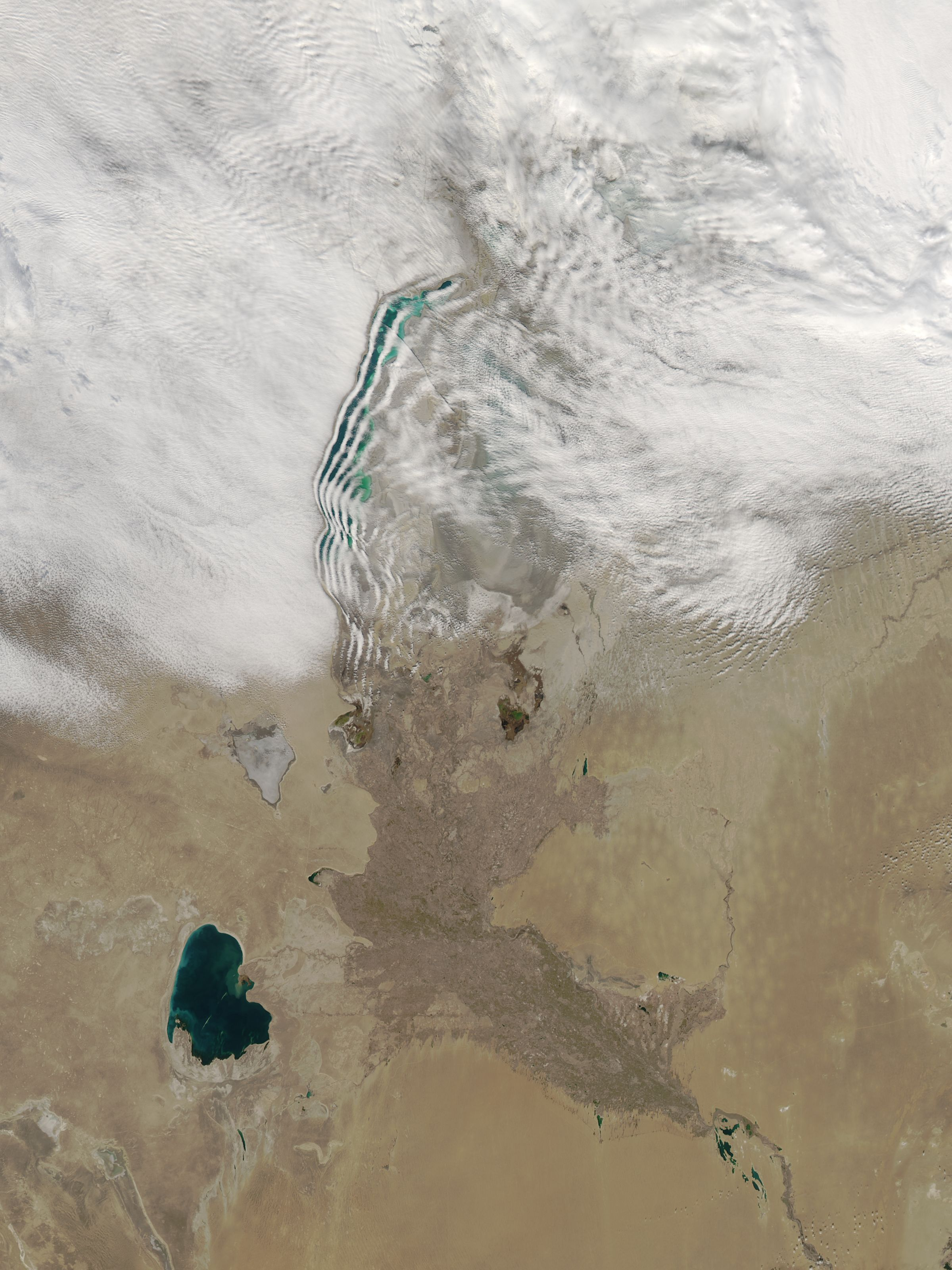
Unusual wave clouds over the Aral Sea, seen from NASA's Aqua satellite on March 12, 2009.

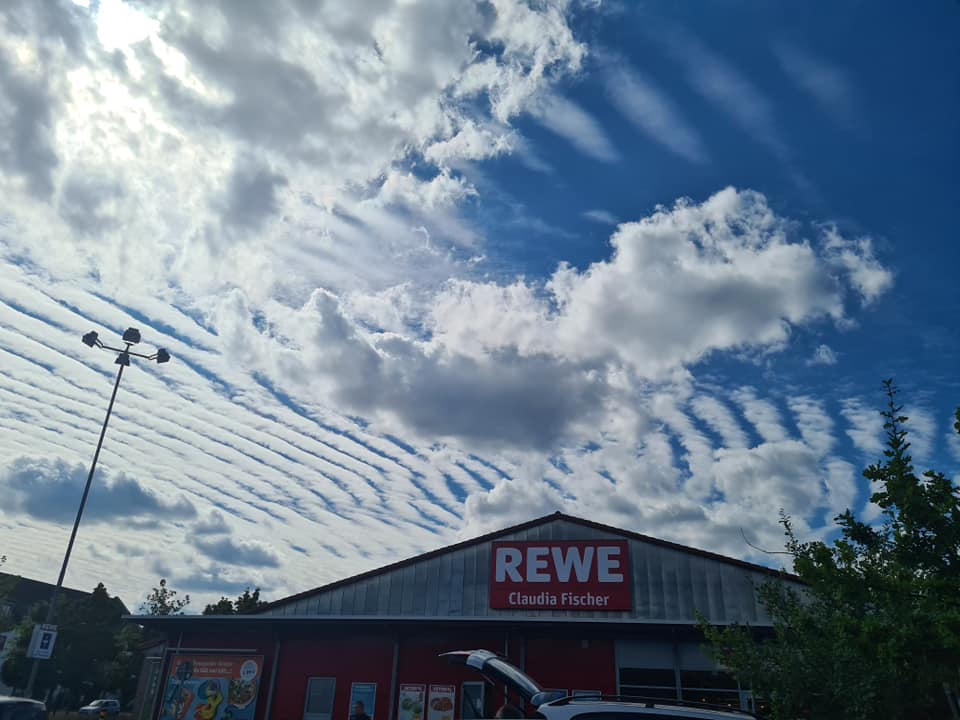
Wave cloud pattern in Germany on August 25, 2020.

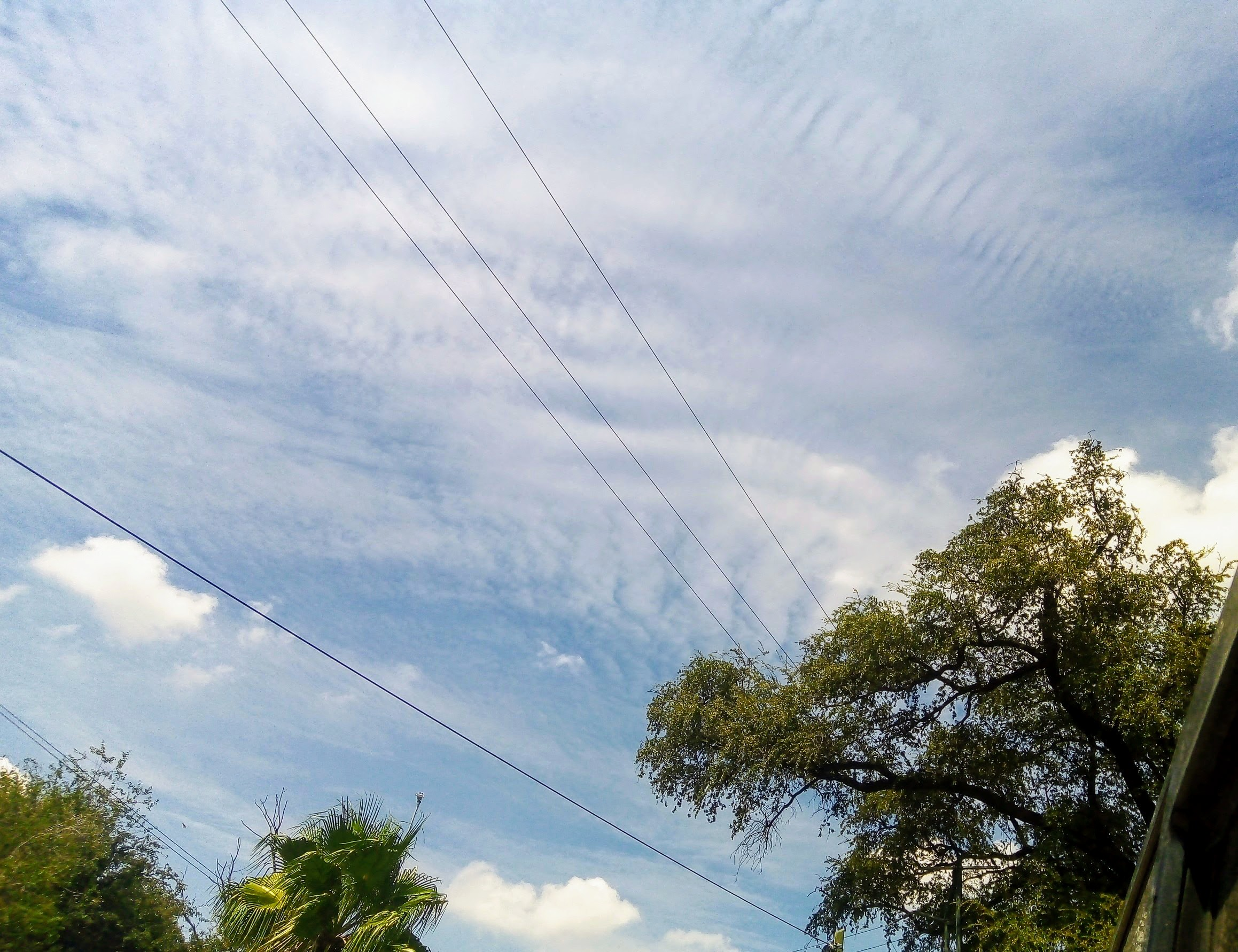
Wave clouds in various directions.

== Formation ==
The atmospheric internal waves that form wave clouds are created as stable air flows over a raised land feature such as a mountain range, and can form either directly above or in the lee of the feature. As an air mass travels through the wave, it undergoes repeated uplift and descent. If there is enough moisture in the atmosphere, clouds will form at the cooled crests of these waves. In the descending part of the wave, those clouds will evaporate due to adiabatic heating, leading to the characteristic clouded and clear bands. The cloud base on the leeward side is higher than on the windward side, because precipitation on the windward side removes water from the air.

It is possible that simple convection from mountain summits can also form wave clouds. This occurs as the convection forces a wave or lenticular wave cloud into the more stable air above.

== Importance ==
=== Climate modelling ===
Wave clouds are typically mid- to upper-tropospheric ice clouds. They are relatively easy to study, because they are quite consistent. As a result, they are being analyzed to increase our understanding of how these upper-level ice clouds influence the Earth's radiation budget. Understanding this can improve climate models.

=== Recreation ===
The streamlines in these clouds have the steepest slope a few kilometers downwind of the lee slope of a mountain. It is in these regions of highest vertical velocity that sailplanes can reach record-breaking altitudes.

== Structure ==
In an ideal model, a wave cloud consists of supercooled liquid water at the lower part, a mixed phase of frozen and liquid water near the ridge, and ice beginning slightly below the ridge and extending downstream. However, this doesn't always occur. Wave cloud structure ranges from smooth and simple, to jumbled phases occurring randomly. Often, ice crystals can be found downwind of the waves. Whether this happens depends on the saturation of the air. The composition of the ice is currently an active topic of study. The main mechanism for ice formation is homogeneous nucleation. The ice crystals are mostly small spheroidal and irregular-shaped particles. Ice columns make up less than 1%, and plates are virtually nonexistent. Multi-level mountain wave clouds form when the moisture in the air above the mountain is located in distinct layers, and vertical mixing is inhibited.

== See also ==
- Lee waves
- Orographic lift
- Horizontal convective rolls
