= Horizontal convective rolls =

Long rolls of counter-rotating air

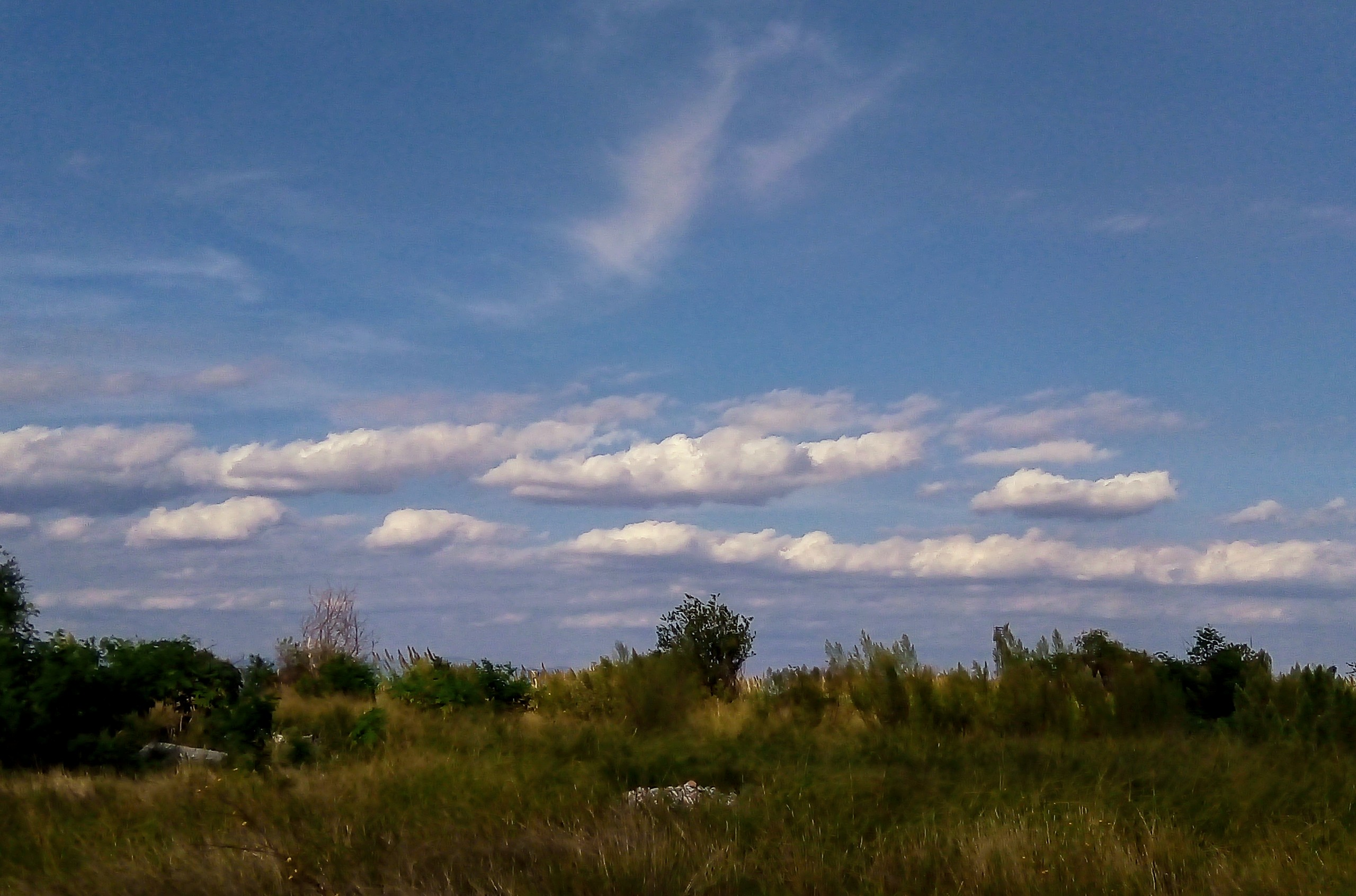
Horizontal convective rolls

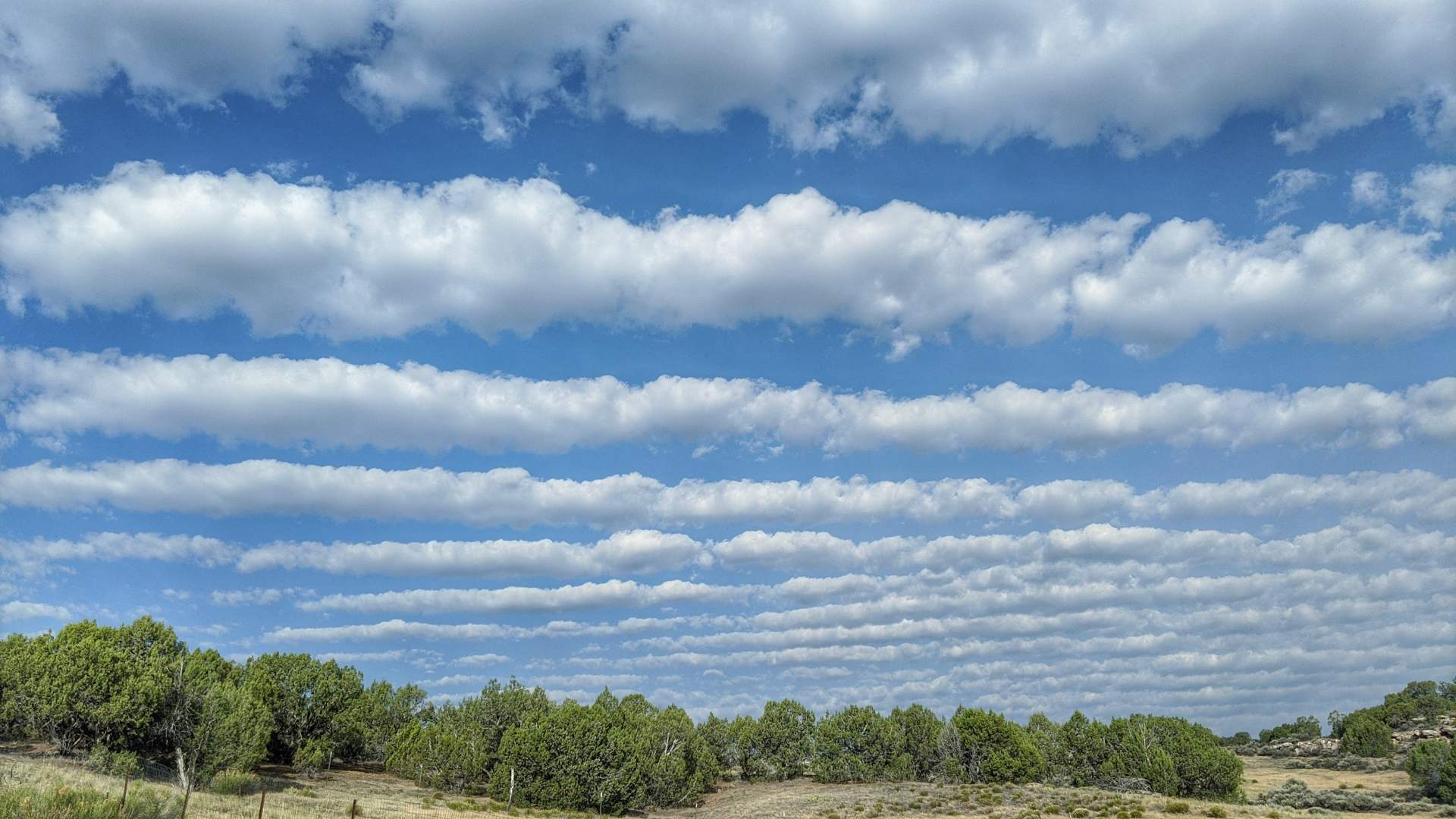
Roll clouds observed from Grand Junction, CO

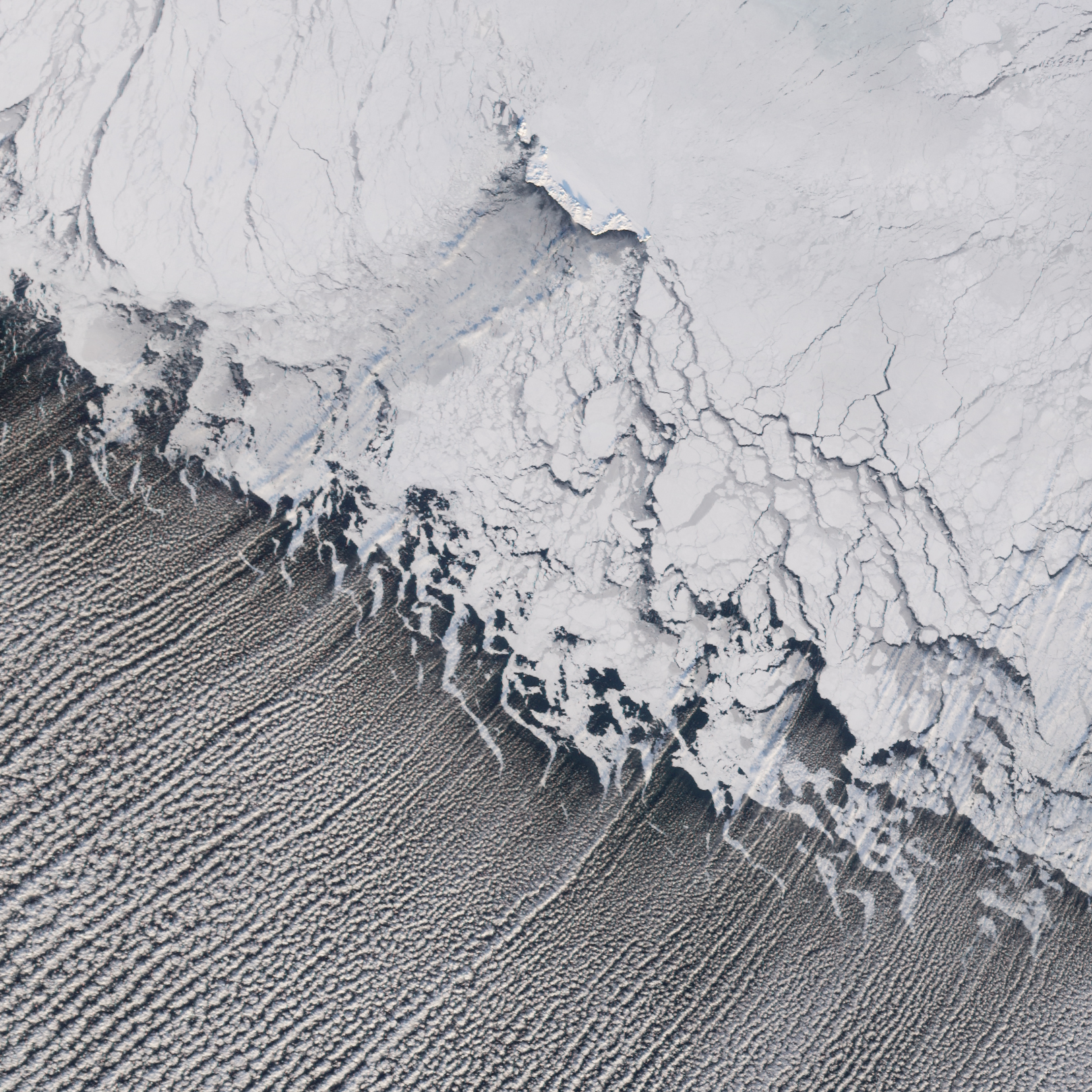
Horizontal convective rolls producing cloud streets (lower left portion of the image) over the Bering Sea.

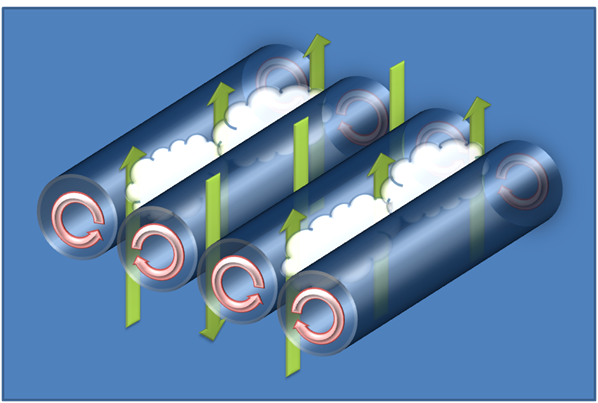
Simple schematic of the production of cloud streets by horizontal convective rolls.

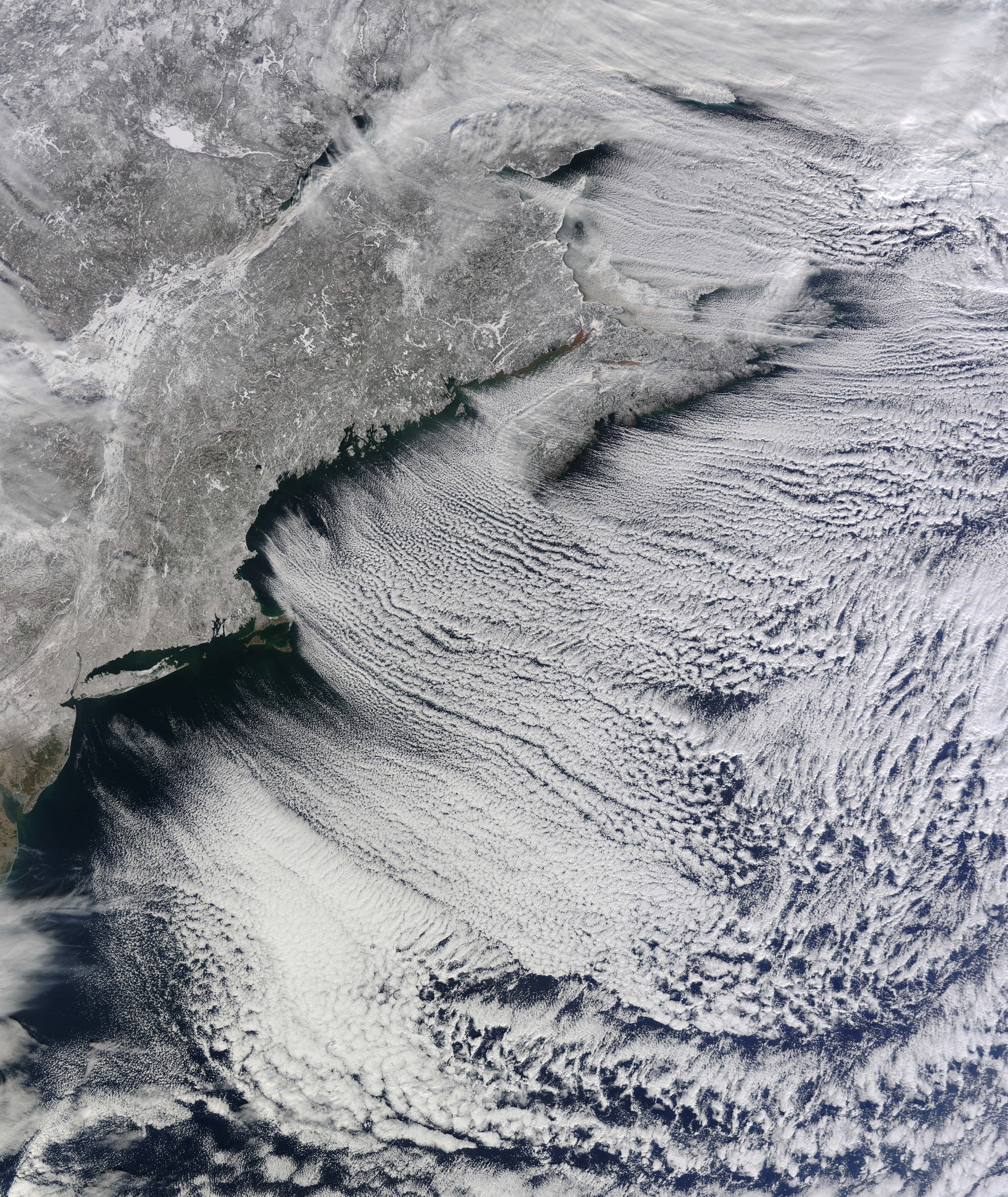
Lines of clouds streets stretch from north-west to south-east in this natural-colour satellite view of New England.

Horizontal convective rolls, also known as horizontal roll vortices or cloud streets, are long rolls of counter-rotating air that are oriented approximately parallel to the ground in the planetary boundary layer. Although seen in satellite photographs for the last 30 years, their development is poorly understood, due to a lack of observational data. From the ground, they appear as rows of cumulus or cumulus-type clouds aligned parallel to the low-level wind. Research has shown these eddies to be significant to the vertical transport of momentum, heat, moisture, and air pollutants within the boundary layer. Cloud streets are usually more or less straight; rarely, cloud streets assume paisley patterns when the wind driving the clouds encounters an obstacle. Those cloud formations are known as von Kármán vortex streets.

== Characteristics ==
Horizontal rolls are counter-rotating vortex rolls that are nearly aligned with the mean wind of the Planetary Boundary Layer (PBL). They can be caused by convection in the presence of a moderate wind and/or dynamic inflection point instabilities in the mean wind profile. Early theory on the features predict that the vortices may be aligned up to 30° to the left for stably stratified environments, 18° to the left for neutral environments, and nearly parallel to the mean wind for unstably stratified (convective) environments. This theory has been supported by aircraft observations from several field experiments.

The depth of a vortex is usually the depth of the boundary layer, which is generally on the order of 1–2 km. A vortex pair usually has a lateral to vertical dimension ratio of around 3:1. Experimental studies have shown that the aspect ratio (a ratio of roll wavelength to boundary layer depth) has been found to vary between 2:1 and 6:1, however, in some situations, the aspect ratio may be as large as 10:1. The lifetime of a convective roll can last from hours to days.

If the environmental air is near saturation, condensation may occur in updrafts produced from the vortex rotation. The sinking motion produced between alternating pairs of rolls will evaporate clouds. This, combined with the updrafts, will produce rows of clouds. Glider pilots often use the updrafts produced by cloud streets enabling them to fly straight for long distances, hence the name “cloud streets”.

== Development and required environmental conditions ==
The exact process that leads to the formation of horizontal rolls is complicated. The basic stress mechanism in the PBL is turbulent flux of momentum, and this term must be approximated in the fluid dynamic equations of motion in order to model the Ekman layer flow and fluxes.

The linear approximation, the eddy diffusivity equation with an eddy diffusion coefficient K, allowed Ekman to obtain a simple logarithmic spiral solution. However the frequent presence of the horizontal roll vortices in the PBL, which represent an organization of the turbulence (coherent structures), indicate that the diffusivity approximation is not adequate. Ekman's solution has an intrinsic inflectional wind profile that was found to be unstable to long waves corresponding to the organized large vortices scale. The nonlinear theory showed that the growth of these finite perturbation waves modifies the mean flow, eliminating the dynamic inflectional instability energy so that equilibrium is obtained. The modified mean flow corresponds well with observations. This solution for the layer containing the PBL-scale roll wavelength requires a modification of the flux transports to accommodate modeling of the advective motion of the large vortices.

The most favorable conditions for the formation of the rolls occur when the lowermost layer of air is unstable, but is capped by an inversion-by a stable layer of air. There must be a moderate wind. This often occurs when upper air is subsiding, such as under anticyclonic conditions, and is also frequently found when radiation fog has formed overnight. Convection occurs below the inversion, with air rising in thermals below the clouds and sinking in the air between the streets.

Turbulent energy derived from dynamic instabilities is produced from wind shear energy. Higher wind favors this roll development while convective energy modifies it. Convection in the presence of low speed produces rolls as instability growth in shear is suppressed. Convection in very low wind environments generally produce cellular convection.

Although this solution has been verified with numerous observations, it is complicated, involving chaos theory mathematics, and has not been widely used. However, when incorporated into the NCEP forecast models using satellite surface wind data, it significantly improved the forecasts. The nonlinear solution, with explicit description of the finite perturbation coherent structure rolls constitutes a significant contribution to the theory of chaos for organization of turbulence.

== See also ==
- Atmospheric convection
- Wave cloud
