= Cirrocumulus cloud =

Genus of high-altitude clouds

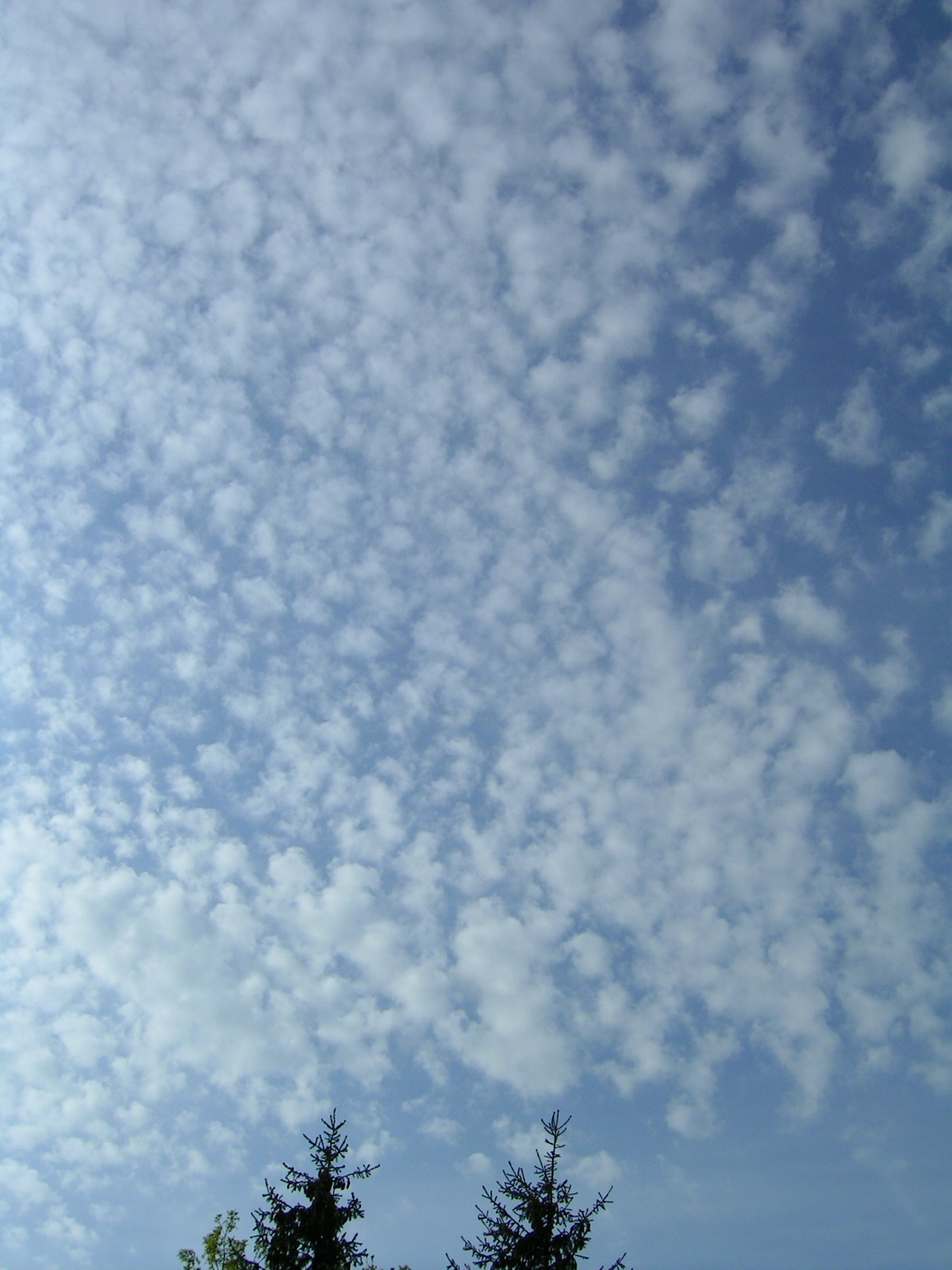
- Cirrocumulus floccus
- Abbreviation: Cc
- Genus: Cirro- (curl) -cumulus (heaped)
- Species: Castellanus; Floccus; Lenticularis; Stratiformis
- Variety: Lacunosus; Undulatus
- Altitude: 6,096–15,000 m (20,000–49,000 ft)
- Classification: Family A (High-level)
- Appearance: Small, flakey, and white high-altitude cumulus patches.
- Precipitation: Occasionally virga. May form ahead of a frontal system, especially together with other cirriform clouds meaning rain in around 10 hours.

Cirrocumulus is one of the three main genus types of high-altitude tropospheric clouds, the other two being cirrus and cirrostratus. They usually occur at an altitude of 5 to 12 km (16,000 to 39,000 ft), however they can occur as low as 10,000 ft (3.0 km) in the arctic and weather reporting standards such as the Canadian MANOBS suggests heights of 29,000 ft (8.8 km) in summer and 26,000 ft (7.9 km) in winter. Like lower-altitude cumuliform and stratocumuliform clouds, cirrocumulus signifies convection. Unlike other high-altitude tropospheric clouds like cirrus and cirrostratus, cirrocumulus includes a small amount of liquid water droplets, although these are in a supercooled state. Ice crystals are the predominant component, and typically, the ice crystals cause the supercooled water drops in the cloud to rapidly freeze, transforming the cirrocumulus into cirrostratus. This process can also produce precipitation in the form of a virga consisting of ice or snow. Thus, cirrocumulus clouds are usually short-lived. They usually only form as part of a short-lived transitional phase within an area of cirrus clouds and can also form briefly as a result of the breaking up of part of a cumulonimbus anvil.

Properly, the term cirrocumulus refers to each cloud, but is typically also used to refer to an entire patch of cirrocumulus. When used in this way, each cirrocumulus element is referred to as a "cloudlet".

== Appearance ==
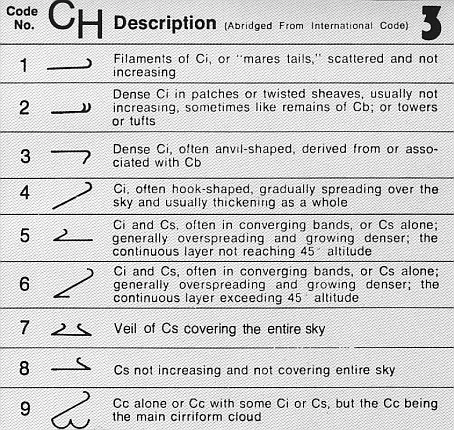
High cloud weather map symbols

Cirrocumulus is a cloud of the stratocumuliform physical category that shows both stratiform and cumuliform characteristics and typically appears as white, patchy sheets with ripples or tufts without gray shading. Each cloudlet appears no larger than a finger held at arm's length. These often are organized in rows like other cumuliform and stratocumuliform clouds, but since they are so small, cirrocumulus patches take on a finer appearance, sometimes also referred to colloquially as "herringbone" or as a "mackerel sky". Cirrocumulus is coded C_{H}9 for the main genus-type and all subforms.

Cirrocumulus is distinguished from altocumulus in several ways, although the two stratocumuliform genus types can occasionally occur together with no clear demarcation between them. Cirrocumulus generally occur at higher altitudes than altocumulus, thus the "cloudlets" appear smaller, as they are more distant from observation at ground level. They are also colder. Cirrocumulus clouds never cast self-shadows and are translucent to a certain degree. They are also typically found amongst other cirrus clouds in the sky and are usually themselves seen to be transforming into these other types of cirrus. This often occurs at the leading edge of a warm front, where many types of cirriform clouds can be present.

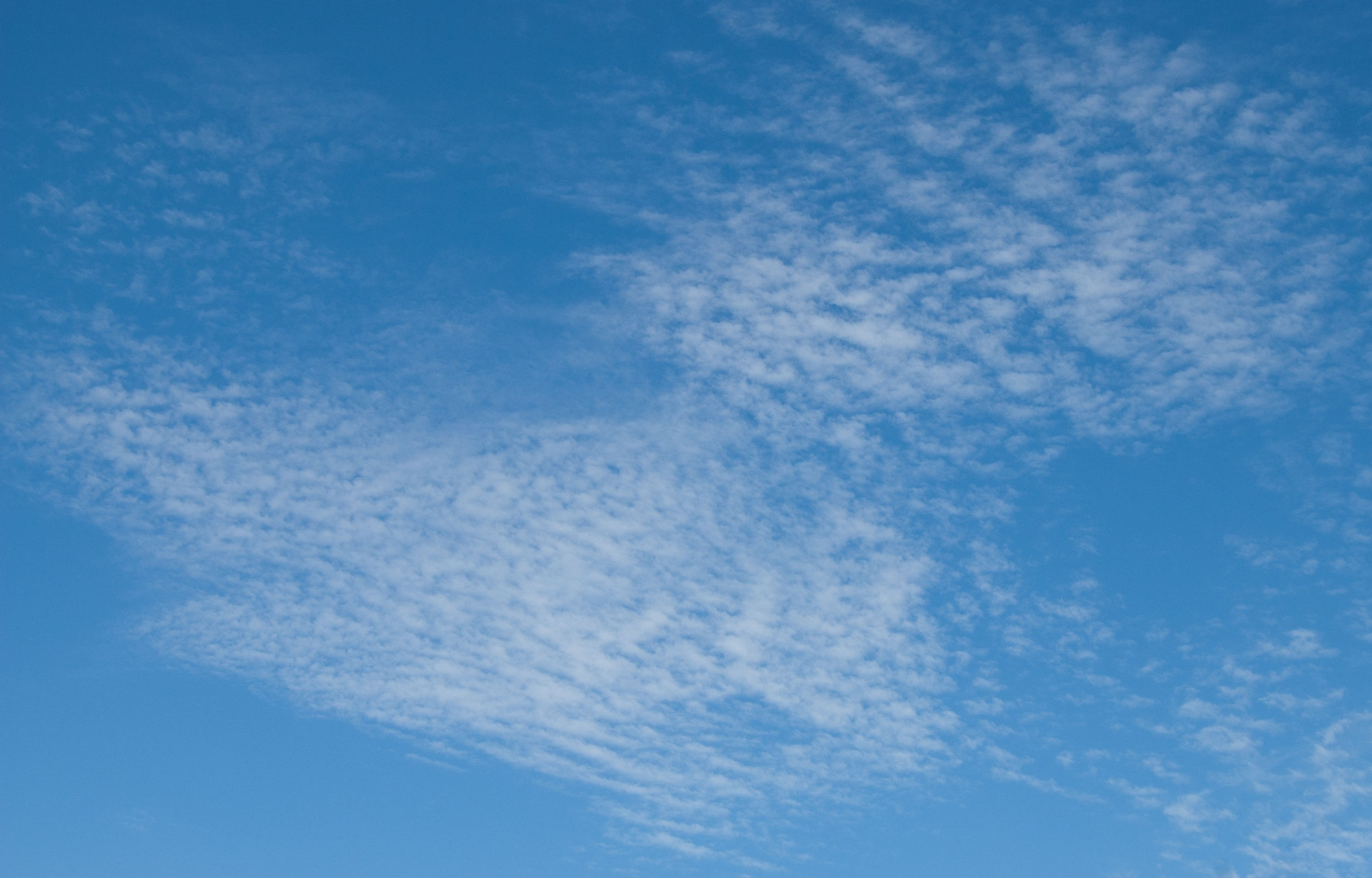
Cirrocumulus clouds on a summer afternoon

Cirrocumulus clouds tend to reflect the red and yellow colours during a sunset and sunrise, so they have been referred to as "one of the most beautiful clouds". This occurs because they reflect the unscattered rays of light from the early morning or evening sun, and those rays are yellow, orange, red, and sometimes purple.

== Forecasting ==
Cirrocumulus usually only forms in patches. If it forms in patches with cirrus or cirrostratus and the clouds spread across the sky, it usually means rain in 8–10 hours (can be more if the front is slow-moving). Only small patches of cirrocumulus and perhaps some wisps of cirrus usually mean a continuation of good weather (although this may also be seen in conjunction with showers and thunderstorms). If it is seen after rain, it usually means improving the weather.

== Subtypes ==
- Species: Cirrocumulus stratiformis (Cc str) is one of four species and appears in the form of relatively flat stratocumuliform sheets or patches. The species Cirrocumulus lenticularis (Cc len) takes its name from the lens-shaped structure of this cloud which is tapered at each end. Cirrocumulus castellanus (Cc cas) has cumuliform buildups that give the cloud a partly or mainly turreted appearance. When the cumuliform parts have more of a tufted appearance, it is given the species name Cirrocumulus floccus (Cc flo). Cirrocumulus with castellanus buildups can show some vertical extent, but are not usually classified as vertical or multi-étage clouds.
  - Varieties: This genus type is always translucent and so has no opacity-based varieties. However, like cirrus, certain cirrocumulus species can sometimes be divided into pattern-based varieties. The undulatus variety has a wavy undulating base and is seen mostly with the stratiformis and lenticularis species types. The lacunosus variety contains circular holes caused by downdrafts in the cloud and is associated mainly with the species stratiformis, castellanus, and floccus.
    - Precipitation-based supplementary feature: Cirrocumulus occasionally produces virga, precipitation that evaporates before reaching the ground.
    - Cloud-based supplementary feature: Mamma in the form of downward forming bubbles is infrequently seen as a cloud-based supplementary feature.
    - Mother clouds: This genus type has no recognized genitus mother clouds. However cirrocumulus stratiformis cirromutatus or cirrostratomutatus can result from sheets or filaments of high cloud taking on a stratocumuli form structure as a result of high altitude convection. A high layer of white or light grey altocumulus of a particular species can thin out into pure white cirrocumulus altocumulomutatus of the same species.

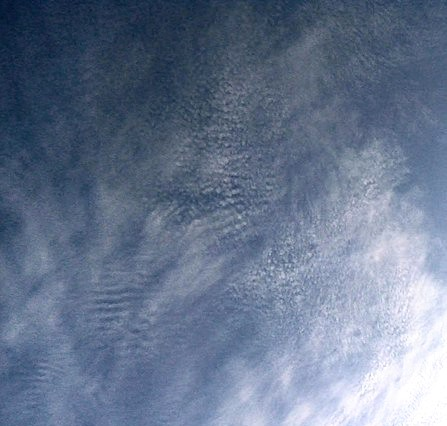
Cirrocumulus undulatus clouds
