= Stratocumulus volutus =

Type of cloud

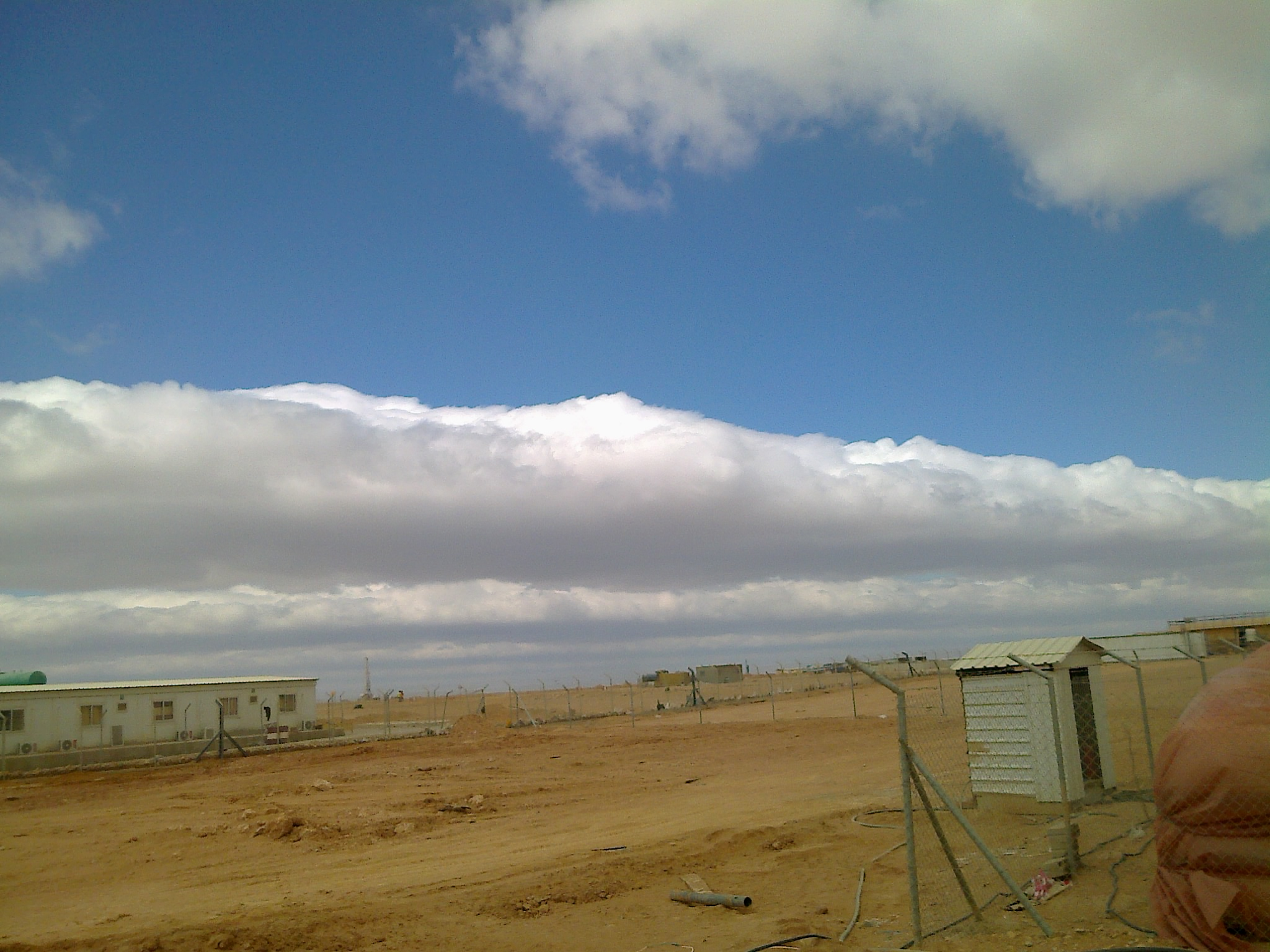
- Stratocumulus volutus
- Abbreviation: Sc vol
- Genus: Stratocumulus
- Species: Volutus
- Altitude: <2,000 m (<6,600 ft)
- Classification: Family C (Low-level)
- Appearance: Long tube-shaped cloud, usually singular
- Precipitation: Rain

Stratocumulus volutus is a rare species of stratocumulus cloud, typically forming alone. Volutus is translated from Latin, meaning revolve, being described as a roll cloud. Stratocumulus volutus clouds are low-level clouds, forming below 2,000 meters (6,600 feet). Volutus clouds are much more common in the form of stratocumulus, as opposed to altocumulus volutus. Stratocumulus volutus clouds are not severe, and may only bring several minutes of rain. Alternatively, stratocumulus volutus clouds may form with numerous layers, contradicting the usual rounded form.

== See also ==
- List of cloud types
- Stratocumulus cloud
- Cumulus cloud
- Roll cloud
