= Nimbostratus cloud =

Common type of rain cloud

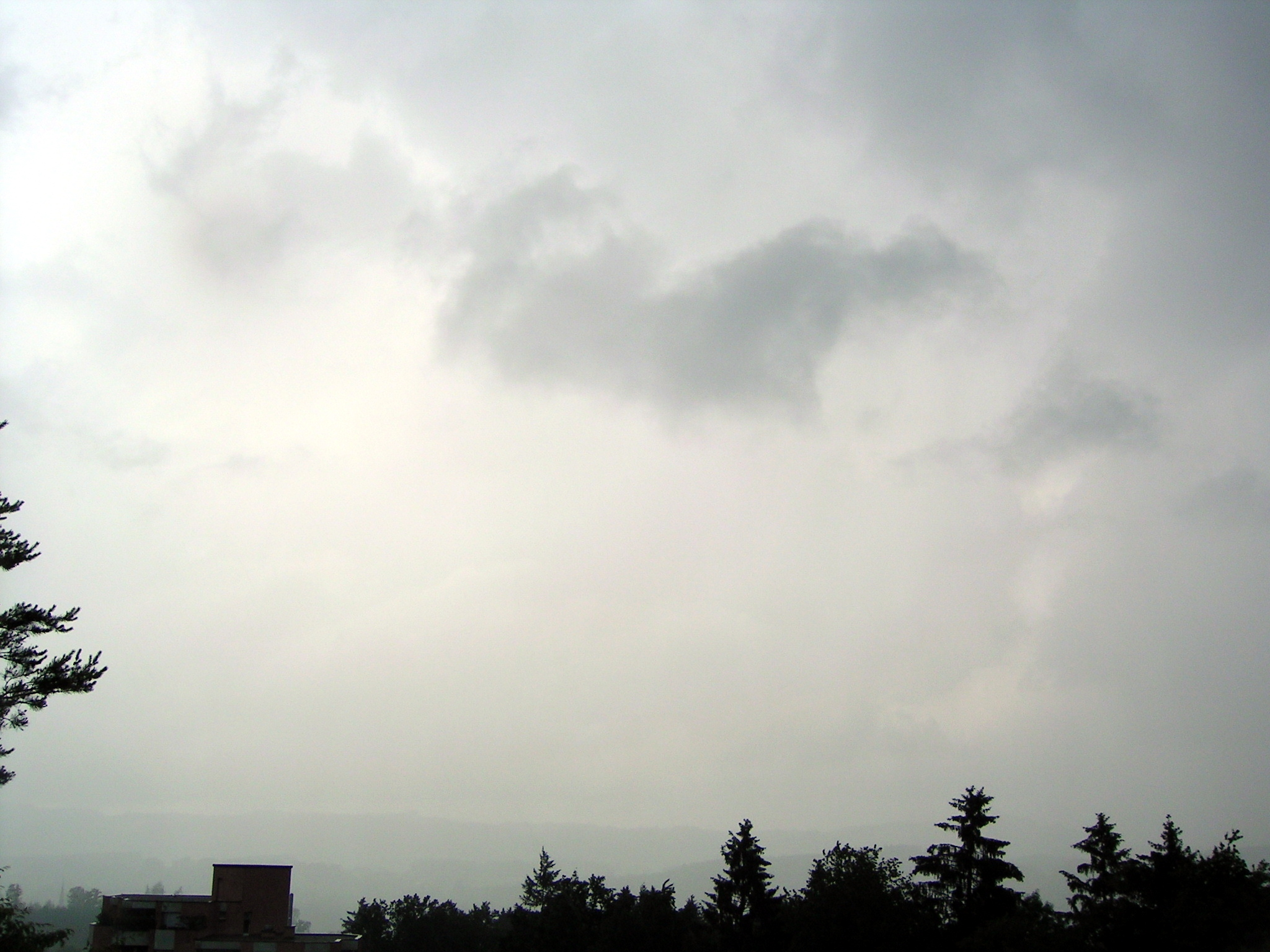
- Nimbostratus with pannus
- Abbreviation: Ns
- Genus: Nimbostratus (rain, layered)
- Altitude: 500–5,500 m (2,000–18,000 ft)
- Appearance: Dark and featureless layer cloud full of water vapor; responsible for rain and snow
- Precipitation: Yes: rain, ice pellets, or snow; sometimes virga

A nimbostratus cloud is a multilevel, amorphous, nearly uniform, and often dark-grey cloud that usually produces continuous rain, snow, or sleet, but no lightning or thunder.

Although it is usually a low-based stratiform cloud, it actually forms most commonly in the middle level of the troposphere and then spreads vertically into the low and high levels. Nimbostratus usually produces precipitation over a wide area.

The prefix nimbo- comes from the Latin word nimbus, which means "rain bearing cloud".

Downward-growing nimbostratus can have the same vertical extent as most large upward-growing cumulus, but its horizontal expanse tends to be even greater.

== Appearances ==
Nimbostratus has a diffuse cloud base generally found near the surface in the lower levels to about 2,000 to 4,000 m (6,600 to 13,100 ft) in the middle levels of the troposphere. Although usually dark at its base, it often appears illuminated from within to a surface observer. Though found worldwide, nimbostratus occurs more commonly in the middle latitudes. It is coded C_{M}2 on the SYNOP report.

== Formation ==
Nimbostratus occurs along a warm front or occluded front where the slowly rising warm air mass creates nimbostratus along with shallower stratus clouds producing less rain, these clouds being preceded by higher-level clouds such as cirrostratus and altostratus. Often, when an altostratus cloud thickens and descends into lower altitudes, it will become nimbostratus.

Nimbostratus, unlike cumulonimbus, is not associated with thunderstorms, however at an unusually unstable warm front caused as a result of the advancing warm air being hot, humid and unstable, cumulonimbus clouds may be embedded within the usual nimbostratus. Lightning from an embedded cumulonimbus cloud may interact with the nimbostratus but only in the immediate area around it. In this situation with lightning and rain occurring it would be hard to tell which type of cloud was producing the rain from the ground, however cumulonimbus tend to produce larger droplets and more intense downpours. The simultaneous presence of cumulonimbus and nimbostratus clouds is uncommon; nimbostratus clouds are typically associated with warm fronts and occasionally appear along cold fronts. However nimbostratus in Australian east coast low pressure systems (ECL) can bring some of the heaviest rainfall totals on record due to the Tasman sea, which is often warm. For instance, Sydney has recorded a 24-hour rainfall total of 327.8 mm (12.91 in) purely from nimbostratus, with 100 mm (3.9 in) falling in the three hours from noon to 3:00 pm. The simultaneous presence of cumulonimbus and nimbostratus clouds is common in eastern Australia, and these storms are called "embedded thunderstorms".

== Forecast ==
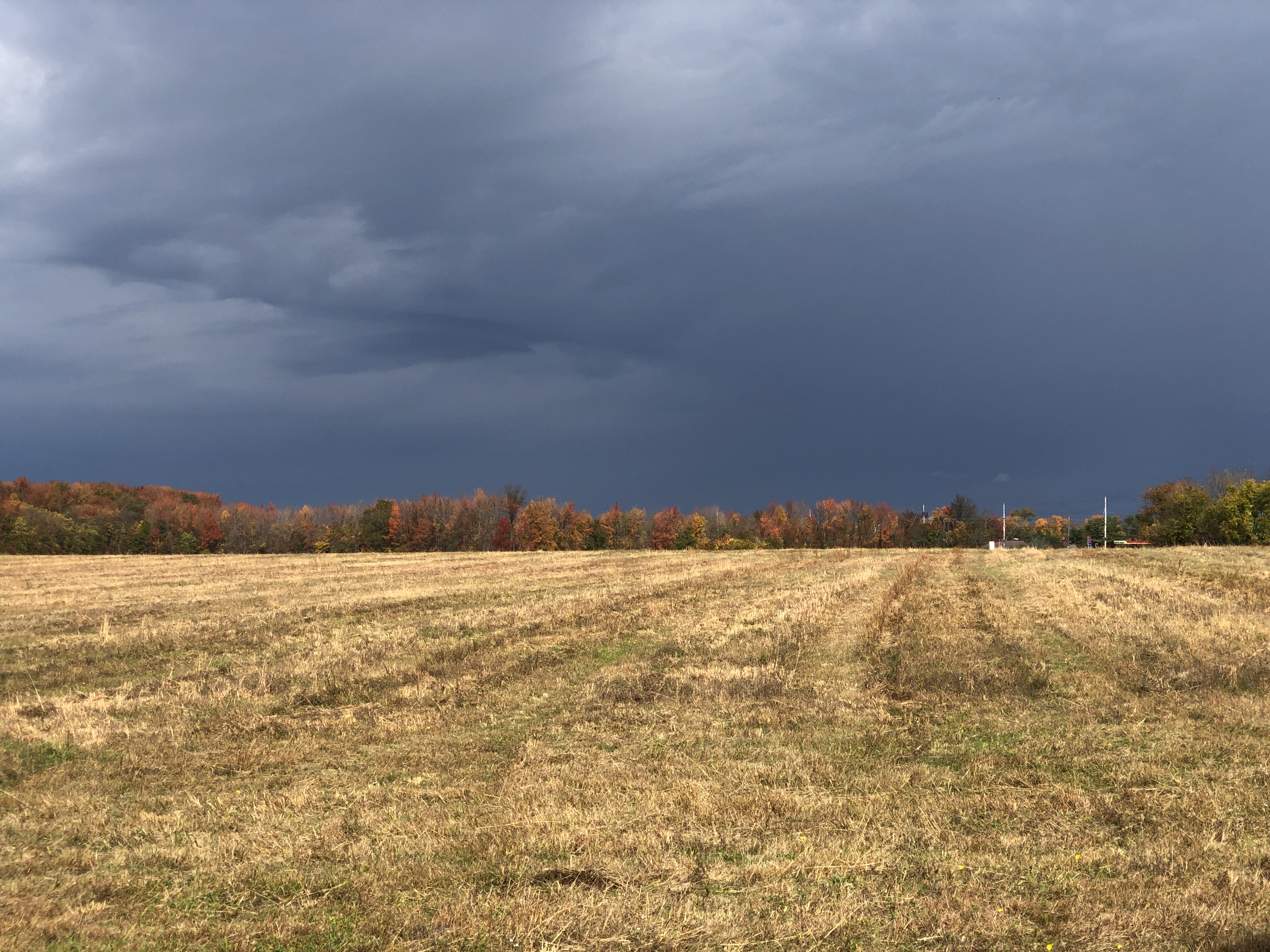
Nimbostrati often have very few visual features.

Nimbostratus is generally a sign of an approaching warm or occluded front producing steady moderate precipitation, as opposed to the shorter period of typically heavier precipitation released by a cold-frontal cumulonimbus cloud. Precipitation may last for several days, depending on the speed of the frontal system. A nimbostratus virga cloud is the same as normal nimbostratus, but the rain or snow falls as virga which does not reach the ground. Stratus or stratocumulus usually replace the nimbostratus after the passage of the warm or occluded front.

== Origin of name ==
Under Luke Howard's first systematized study of clouds, carried out in France in 1802, three general cloud forms were established based on appearance and characteristics of formation: cirriform, cumuliform and stratiform. These were further divided into upper and lower types depending on altitude. In addition to these three main types, Howard added two names to designate multiple cloud types joined together: cumulostratus, a blending of cumulus clouds and stratus layers, and nimbus, a complex blending of cirriform, cumuliform, and stratiform clouds with sufficient vertical development to produce significant precipitation.

Later, in the 20th century, a commission for the study of clouds by the International Meteorological Committee (IMC), a part of the International Meteorological Organization (IMO), put forward a refined and more restricted definition of the genus nimbus, effectively reclassifying it as a stratiform cloud type. It was then renamed nimbostratus, and published with the new name in the 1932 edition of the International Atlas of Clouds and of States of the Sky. This left cumulonimbus as the only nimboform type as indicated by its root name.

== Subtypes and derivative types ==
- Species and varieties: Nimbostratus is very thick, opaque, and featureless, so this genus type is not subdivided into species or varieties.

- Precipitation-based supplementary features: Nimbostratus is a major precipitation cloud and produces the virga or precipitation features. The latter can achieve heavy intensity due to the cloud's vertical depth.
- Accessory cloud: Nimbostratus pannus is an accessory cloud of nimbostratus that forms as a ragged layer in precipitation below the main cloud deck. Pannus is coded C_{L}7.
- Genitus mother clouds: This genus type can form from cumulus and cumulonimbus.
- Mutatus mother clouds: Nimbostratus can form due to the complete transformation of altocumulus, altostratus and stratocumulus.

== Relation to other clouds ==
Multi-level nimbostratus is physically related to other stratiform genus-types by way of being non-convective in nature. However, the other sheet-like clouds usually each occupy only one or two levels at the same time. Stratus clouds are low-level and form from near ground level to 2,000 metres (6,600 ft) at all latitudes. In the middle level are the altostratus clouds that form from 2,000 metres (6,600 ft) to 7,000 metres (23,000 ft) in polar areas, 7,000 metres (23,000 ft) in temperate areas, and 7,600 metres (24,900 ft) in tropical areas. Although altostratus forms mostly in the middle level of the troposphere, strong frontal lift can push it into the lower part of the high-level. The main high-level stratiform cloud is cirrostratus which is composed of ice crystals that often produce halo effects around the sun. Cirrostratus forms at altitudes of 3,000 to 7,600 metres (9,800 to 24,900 ft) in high latitudes, 5,000 to 12,000 metres (16,000 to 39,000 ft) in temperate latitudes, and 6,100 to 18,000 metres (20,000 to 59,100 ft) in low, tropical latitudes. Of the non-stratiform clouds, cumulonimbus and cumulus congestus are the most closely related to nimbostratus because of their vertical extent and ability to produce moderate to heavy precipitation. The remaining cumuliform (cumulus) and stratocumuliform (stratocumulus, altocumulus, and cirrocumulus) clouds have the least in common with nimbostratus.

== See also ==
- Nimbostratus virga
- Cumulonimbus
- List of cloud types
