= Cold front =

Leading edge of a cooler mass of air

The symbol of a cold front: a blue line with triangles pointing in the direction of travel

A cold front is the leading edge of a cooler mass of air at ground level that replaces a warmer mass of air and lies within a pronounced surface trough of low pressure. It often forms behind an extratropical cyclone (to the west in the Northern Hemisphere, to the east in the Southern), at the leading edge of its cold air advection pattern—known as the cyclone's dry "conveyor belt" flow. Temperature differences across the boundary can exceed 30 °C (54 °F) from one side to the other. When enough moisture is present, rain can occur along the boundary. If there is significant instability along the boundary, a narrow line of thunderstorms can form along the frontal zone. If instability is weak, a broad shield of rain can move in behind the front, and evaporative cooling of the rain can increase the temperature difference across the front. Cold fronts are stronger in the fall and spring transition seasons and are weakest during the summer.

== Development of cold fronts ==
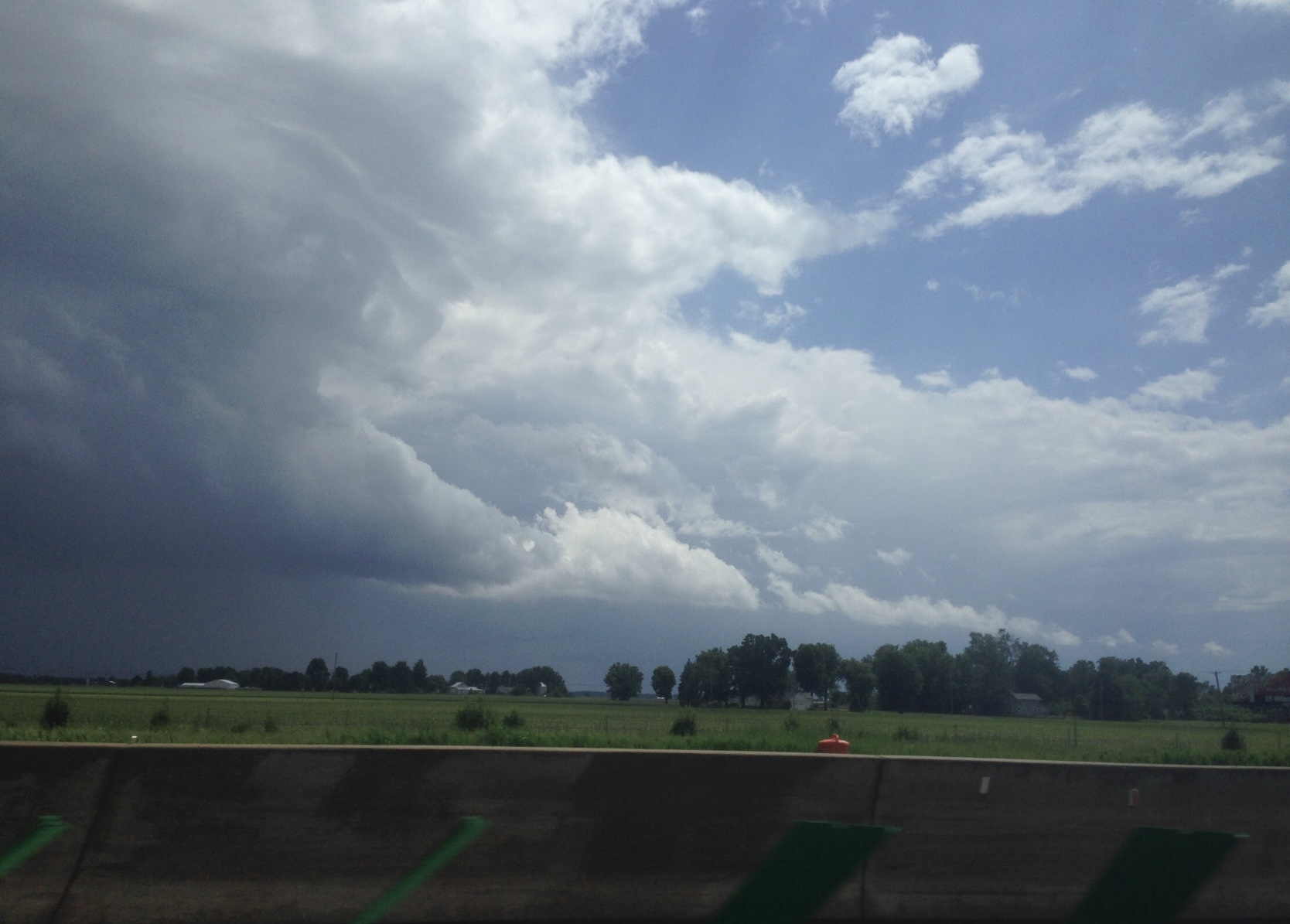
An incoming cold front in northern Ohio (2016)

A cold front occurs when a mass of comparatively colder air moves into where warmer air is present. The drier, colder air forms a steeply sloping boundary under the warmer, moister air at the surface and lifts that air. This often causes cloud formations with a strong vertical development, which may manifest as a line of showers and thunderstorms when enough moisture is present. On weather maps, the surface position of the cold front is marked with the symbol of a blue line of triangles/spikes (pips) pointing in the direction of travel. A cold front's location is at the leading edge of the temperature drop off, which in an isotherm analysis would show up as the leading edge of the isotherm gradient, and it normally lies within a sharp surface trough. Cold fronts move faster than warm fronts and can produce sharper changes in weather. Since cold air is denser than warm air, it rapidly replaces the warm air preceding the boundary.

In the northern hemisphere, a cold front usually causes a shift of wind from southwest to northwest clockwise, also known as veering, and in the southern hemisphere a shift from northwest to southwest (counterclockwise, backing). Atmospheric pressure steadily decreases with the approach of a cold front. With frontal passage, the pressure rises sharply and then stabilizes. Normally, cold fronts can be marked by these characteristics:

Weather phenomenon	Prior to the passing of the front	While the front is passing	After the passing of the front
Temperature	Warm	Cooling suddenly	Steadily cooling
Atmospheric pressure	Decreasing steadily	Lowest, then sudden increase	Increasing steadily
Winds	Southwest to southeast (northern hemisphere); Northwest to northeast (southern hemisphere)	Gusty; shifting	North to west, usually northwest (northern hemisphere); South to west, usually southwest (southern hemisphere)
Precipitation/conditions*	Light patchy rain can be produced by stratocumulus or stratus in the warm sector. In summer, sometimes thunderstorms if a preceding squall line is present. In winter snow squalls or showers may occur.	Prolonged rain (nimbostratus) or thunderstorms (cumulonimbus): depends on conditions.	Showers, then clearing
Clouds*	Often preceded by cirrus, cirrostratus then altostratus like a warm front (but usually with smaller amounts of these clouds). Areas of cirrocumulus and altocumulus within cirrostratus and altostratus more commonly seen than at a warm front. Larger cumulus clouds under the higher cloud types than at a warm front, where stratocumulus and cumulus humilis usually occur. Some of these cumulus clouds may produce showers ahead of the front.	Cumulonimbus and cumulus congestus producing frequent showers, with a sheet of upper altostratus, through which the sun can sometimes be seen. Less commonly nimbostratus occurs with continuous rain.	Patchy altocumulus or stratocumulus and higher cirrus clouds along with fast moving stratus fractus then eventually scattered cumulus and sometimes cumulonimbus.
Visibility*	Fair to poor in haze	Poor, but improving	Good, except in showers
Dew Point	High, steady	Sudden drop	Falling

*provided there is sufficient moisture.

== Clouds ==
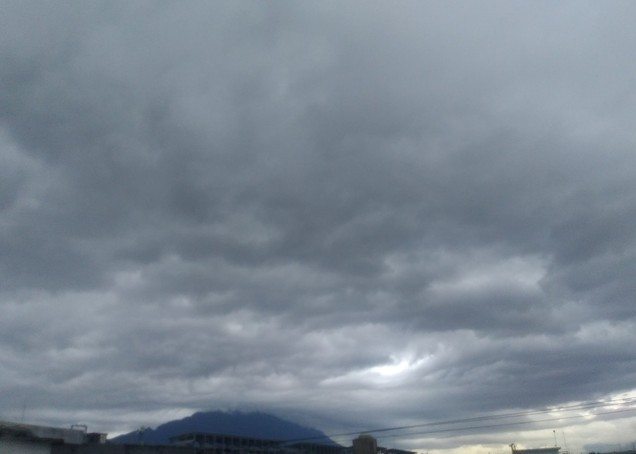
Stratocumulus clouds after a cold front

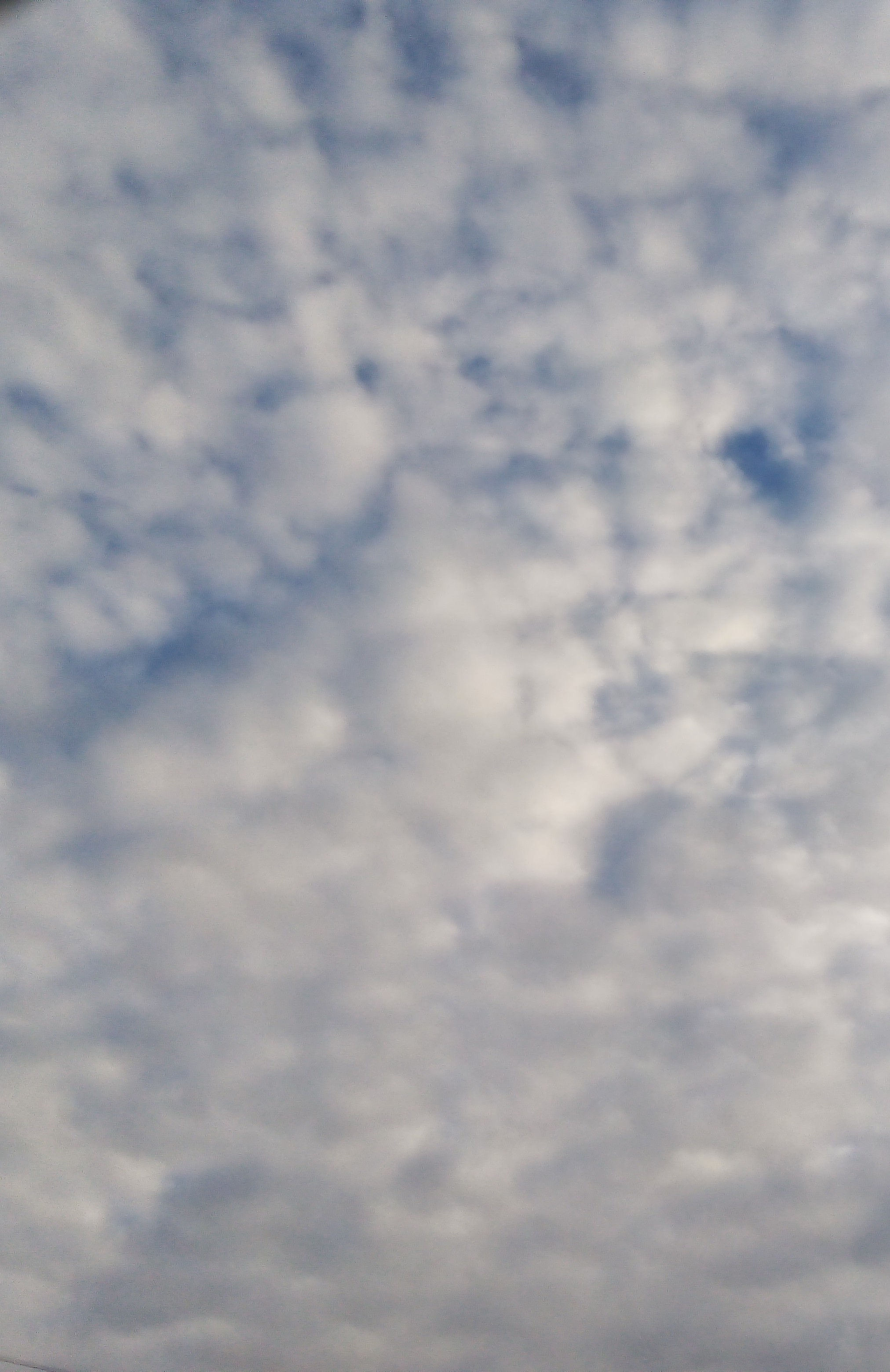
Altocumulus clouds often are a sign of an entering cold front.

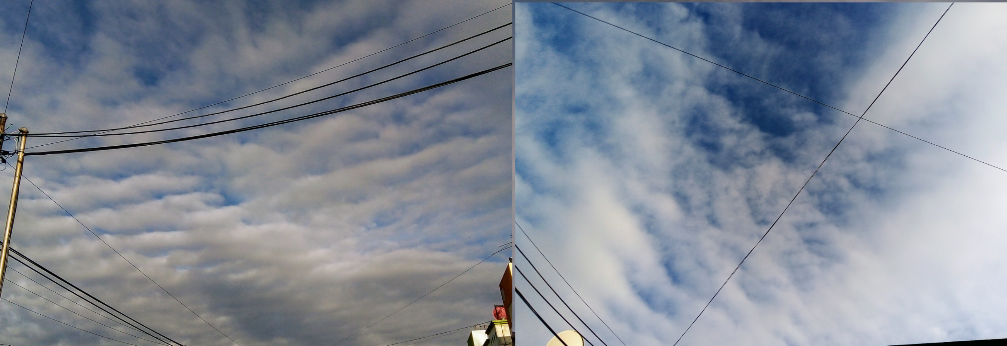
Altocumulus undulatus clouds several hours after a cold front

If the cold front is highly unstable, cumulonimbus clouds producing thunderstorms commonly form along the front. Anvil cirrus clouds may spread a considerable distance downwind from the thunderstorms. The other cloud types associated with a cold front depend on atmospheric conditions such as airmass stability and wind shear. As the front approaches, middle-étage gives way to altostratus and low-level stratocumulus with intermittent light precipitation if the warm airmass being displaced by the cold front is mostly stable. With significant airmass instability, vertically developed cumulus or cumulonimbus with showers and thunderstorms will form along the front.

After the passage of the cold front, the sky usually clears as high pressure builds in behind the system, although significant amounts of cumulus or stratocumulus, often in the form of long bands called cloud streets, may persist if the airmass behind the front remains humid from a source of moisture. Small and unchanging amounts of cumulus or cirrus clouds in an otherwise clear sky are usually indications of continuing fair weather as long as the barometric pressure remains comparatively high.

== Precipitation ==
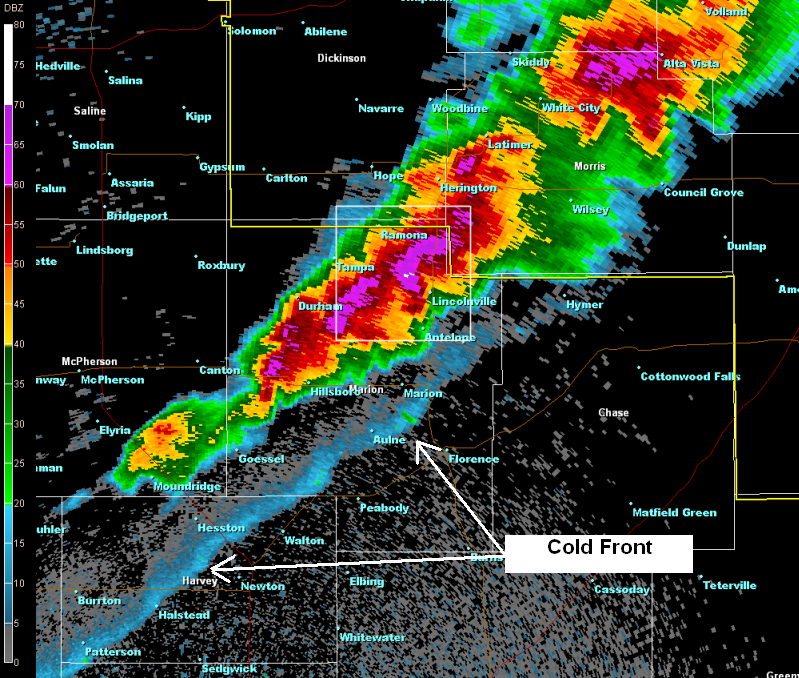
A cold front as it appeared on the National Weather Service Wichita, Kansas WSR-88D on April 3, 2011. The thin blue line labeled "cold front" is the front, with severe thunderstorms seen developing behind the front, which is moving towards the bottom right.

A cold front commonly brings a narrow band of precipitation that follows along the leading edge of the cold front. These bands of precipitation are often very strong, and can bring severe thunderstorms, hailstorms, snow squalls, and/or tornadoes. In the spring, these cold fronts can be very strong, and can bring strong winds when the pressure gradient is higher than normal. During the winter months, cold fronts sometimes come through an area with little or no precipitation. Wider rain bands can occur behind cold fronts which tend to have more stratiform, and less convective, precipitation. These rainstorms sometimes bring flooding, and can move very slowly when the storm steering it is strong and embedded within a meridional flow pattern (with more pole to equator motion rather than west to east motion). In the winter, cold fronts can bring cold spells, and occasionally snow. In the spring or summer in temperate latitudes, hail may occasionally fall along with the rain. If moisture is not sufficient, such as when a system has previously moved across a mountain barrier, cold fronts can pass without cloudiness.

=== Frontogenetical circulation ===
Frontogenesis is the process of creating or steepening the temperature gradient of a front. During this process the atmosphere reacts in an attempt to restore balance, the consequence is a circular motion along the front where air is being lifted up, along the cold front and dropping downward, behind the frontal boundary. This is the actual force of upward motion along a front that is responsible for clouds and precipitation.

As the temperature gradient steepens during frontogenesis, the thermal wind becomes imbalanced. To maintain balance, the geostrophic wind aloft and below adjust, such that regions of divergence/convergence form. Mass continuity would require a vertical transport of air along the cold front where there is divergence (lowered pressure). Although this circulation is described by a series of processes, they are actually occurring at the same time, observable along the front as a thermally direct circulation. There are several factors that influence the final shape and tilt of the circulation around the front, ultimately determining the kind and location of clouds and precipitation.

== Temperature changes ==
Cold fronts are the leading edge of cooler air masses, hence the name "cold front". They have stronger temperature changes during the fall (autumn) and spring, and during the middle of winter. Temperature changes associated with cold fronts can be as much as 30 °C (54 °F). When cold fronts come through, there is usually a quick, yet strong gust of wind, that shows that the cold front is passing. In surface weather observations, a remark known as FROPA is coded when this occurs. The effects from a cold front can last from hours to days. The air behind the front is cooler than the air it is replacing and the warm air is forced to rise, so it cools. As the cooler air cannot hold as much moisture as warm air, clouds form and rain or snow occur.

== Characteristics of boundaries around an extratropical cyclone ==
Occluded cyclone example. The triple point is the intersection of the cold, warm, and occluded fronts.

Cold fronts form when a cooler air mass moves into an area of warmer air in the wake of a developing extratropical cyclone. The warmer air interacts with the cooler air mass along the boundary, and usually produces precipitation. Cold fronts often follow a warm front or squall line. Very commonly, cold fronts have a warm front ahead but with a perpendicular orientation. In areas where cold fronts catch up to the warm front, the occluded front develops. Occluded fronts have an area of warm air aloft. When such a feature forms poleward of an extratropical cyclone, it is known as a trowal, which is short for trough of warm air aloft. A cold front is re-designated a warm front if it begins to retreat ahead of the next extratropical cyclone along the frontal boundary, and called a stationary front if it stalls. An especially sharp type of cold front, easily discernable in satellite images, is the Narrow Cold Frontal Rainband.

== See also ==
- Air mass
- Blue Norther (weather)
- Cold wave
- Surface weather analysis
- Warm front
- Weather front
