= Altostratus cloud =

Type of middle-altitude cloud

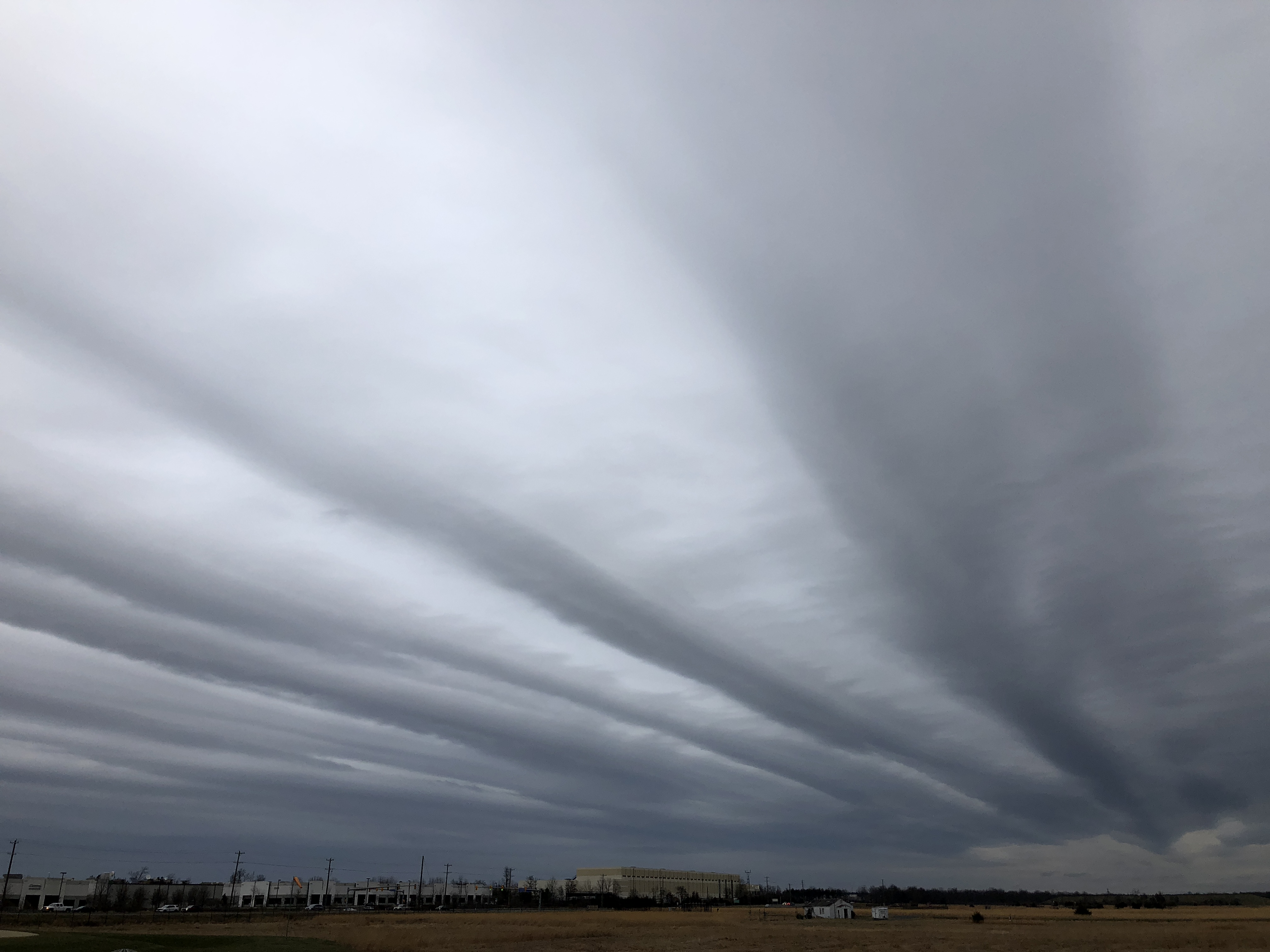
Altostratus radiatus cloud showing distinctive parallel bands

Altostratus are middle-altitude clouds that develop horizontally and have a flat and uniform texture in the mid levels. As a middle-altitude cloud type, they can be made up of water droplets (including supercooled droplets), ice crystals, or a mixture of the two.

Altostratus clouds usually appear as gray or blueish featureless sheets, although some variants have wavy or banded bases. The sun can be seen through thinner altostratus clouds, but thicker layers can be quite opaque.

Altostratus clouds usually predict the arrival of warm fronts. Once altostratus clouds associated with a warm front arrive, continuous rain or snow may follow in the next 12 to 24 hours. While altostratus clouds may herald the arrival of wetter weather, they themselves do not produce significant precipitation, though they can produce sprinkles or light showers. Thunderstorms can be embedded in altostratus clouds, however, bringing showers.

Because altostratus clouds can contain ice crystals, they can produce some optical phenomena like iridescence and coronas.

== Description ==
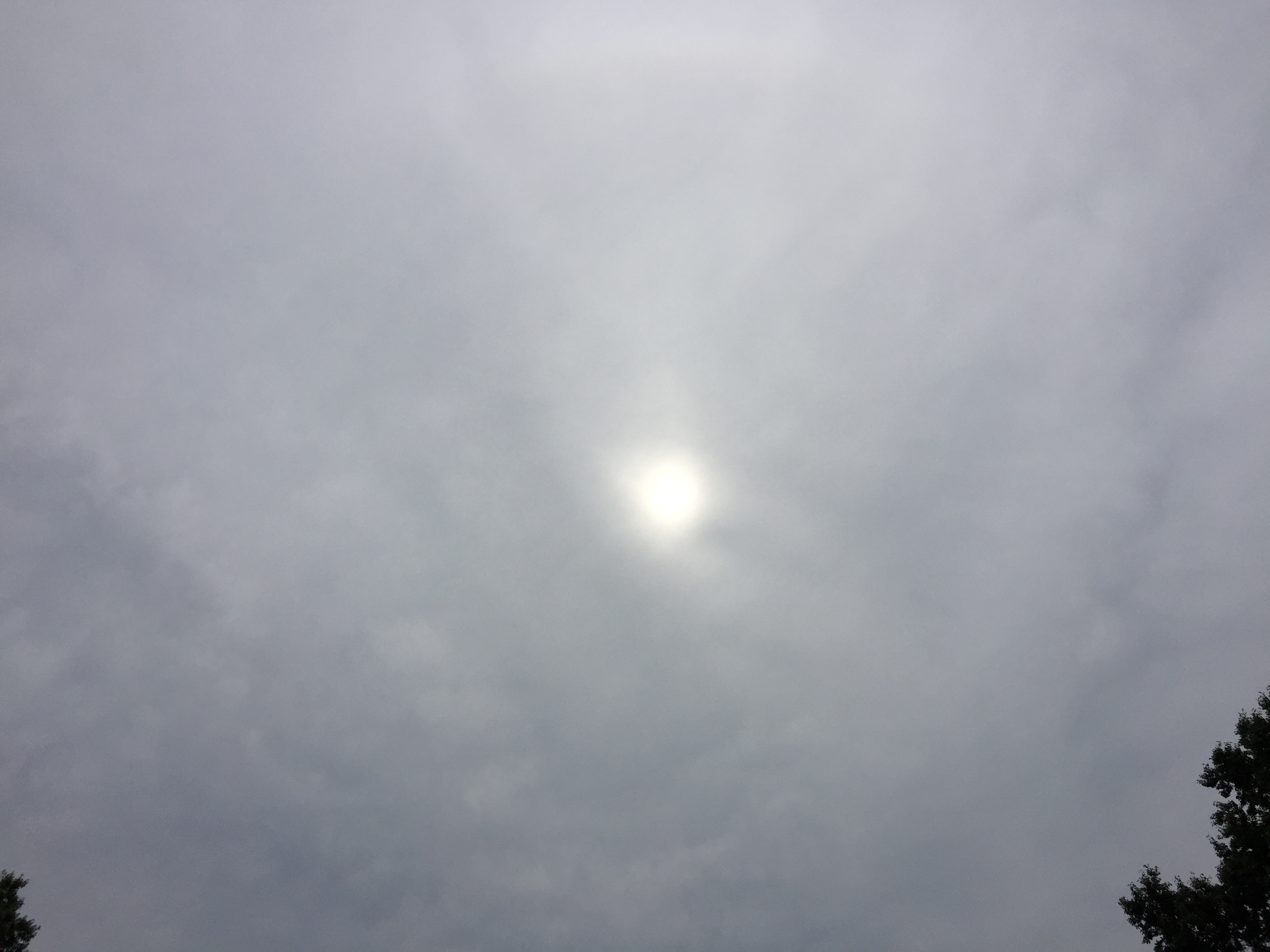
Sun shines dimly though the translucidus variant of altostratus clouds

Altostratus clouds are generally gray or blue-tinged with a largely uniform blanket-like appearance. They do not have distinct features, and usually do not produce precipitation. The name "altostratus" comes from the conjugation of the Latin words "altum", meaning "high", and "stratus", meaning "flat" or "spread out". Altostratus clouds can produce virga, causing the cloud base to appear hazy. While they do not produce significant precipitation, altostratus clouds can cause light sprinkles or even small rain showers. Consistent rainfall and lowering of the cloud base causes altostratus to become nimbostratus.

Unlike most other types of clouds, altostratus clouds are not subdivided into cloud species due to their largely featureless appearance. However, they still appear in five varieties: Altostratus duplicatus, opacus, radiatus, translucidus, and undulatus. Altostratus duplicatus is a rare form of altostratus clouds composed of two or more layers of cloud. Translucidus is a translucent form of altostratus clouds, meaning that the sun or moon can be seen through the cloud, whereas the opacus variety is opaque. Radiatus is another rare variety. It has parallel bands of cloud that stretch toward the horizon. The undulatus variety has an wavy appearance—the underside of the cloud appears to rise and fall.

Altostratus and altocumulus clouds, both of which are mid-level clouds, are commonly measured together in cloud cover studies. Together, they cover around 25% of the Earth's surface on average based on CALIPSO satellite data. This constitutes roughly one third of the Earth's total cloud cover. By itself, separated from altocumulus, altostratus covers ~16% of the Earth's surface. Altostratus cloud cover varies seasonally in temperate regions, with significantly less coverage in the summer months as compared to the other seasons. Additionally, altostratus cloud cover varies by latitude, with tropical regions having vastly fewer altostratus clouds when compared to temperate or polar regions. Altostratus and altocumulus cover roughly 22% of the ocean's surface based on surface measurements, with minimal variation based on season.

Altostratus clouds are warmest at the bottom and coldest at the top, with a fairly consistent lapse rate of 5 to 7 °C per kilometer (14 to 20 °F per mile) inside the cloud. The lapse rate is the rate at which the temperature decreases with altitude. Higher lapse rates (i.e. the faster temperature drops with increasing altitude) were associated with colder clouds. The average temperature of altostratus clouds, based on data collected from roughly 45° to 80° latitude, varied from around −16 to −45 °C (3.2 to −49 °F). Warmer temperatures occurred during summer and colder temperatures during winter.

Inside altostratus clouds, the relative humidity is generally greatest towards the top of the cloud decreasing slowly and roughly linearly towards the bottom. The lowest part of the cloud has the lowest relative humidity. Below the bottom of the cloud, the relative humidity drops rapidly.

=== Microphysical properties ===
Altostratus can be composed of water droplets, supercooled water droplets, and ice crystals, but ice crystals make up the vast majority. In some altostratus clouds made of ice crystals, very thin horizontal sheets of water droplets can appear seemingly at random, but they quickly disappear. The sizes of the ice crystals in the cloud tended to increase as altitude decreased. However, close to the bottom of the cloud, the particles decreased in size again. During the sampling of one cloud, scientists noted a halo while flying near the top of the cloud, which indicated that the ice crystals were hexagonal near the top. However, farther down, the ice crystals became more conglomerated. Mixed-phase (containing both ice and water) altostratus clouds contain a "melt layer", below which the ice crystals tend to melt into water droplets. These water droplets are spheres and thus fall much faster than ice crystals, collecting at the bottom of the cloud.

== Formation ==
Diagram of a warm front

Altostratus clouds form when a large mass of warm air rises, causing water vapor in the atmosphere to condense onto nuclei (small dust particles), forming water droplets and ice crystals. These conditions usually happen at the leading edge of a warm front, where cirrostratus clouds thicken and lower until they transition into altostratus clouds. Alternatively, nimbostratus clouds can thin into altostratus. Altostratus can even form from the spreading of the upper anvil cloud or the middle column of a thunderstorm.

Altostratus clouds are mid-level clouds that form from 2,000 to 4,000 metres (6,600 to 13,000 ft) above sea level in polar regions. In temperate regions, the ceiling increases drastically, allowing altostratus clouds to form between 2,000 to 7,000 metres (6,600 to 23,000 ft). In tropical regions, altostratus can reach even higher, forming from 2,000 to 8,000 metres (6,600 to 26,000 ft). They can range from 1,000 to 5,000 metres (3,300 to 16,000 ft) in thickness and can cover hundreds of kilometers of the Earth's surface.

== Use in forecasting ==
Altostratus clouds tend to form ahead of warm fronts or occluded fronts and herald their arrival. These warm fronts bring warmer air into the region. Occluded fronts form when a faster-moving cold front catches up to a warm front, and the temperature after the frontal system passes may rise or fall. As the frontal system approaches, cirrostratus clouds will thicken into altostratus clouds, which then gradually thicken further into nimbostratus clouds. If the frontal system is occluded, cumulonimbus clouds may also be present. Once the altostratus clouds have arrived, rain or snow will usually follow in the next 12 to 24 hours.

Instability in the atmosphere can embed thunderstorms in an altostratus cloud, although altostratus clouds themselves do not produce storms.

== Effects on climate ==
Globally, clouds reflect around 50 watts per square meter (Note: To break this number, $50 \frac{W}{m^2}$ down into practical terms, 50 watts is enough energy to raise the temperature of 1 liter (1 kilogram) of water by .012 °C every second or around 43 °C every hour. This amount of energy is being reflected by the averaged global cloud cover every single square meter. $Q = m \cdot c \cdot \Delta T \rightarrow \Delta T = \frac{Q}{m \cdot c} = \frac{50 J}{1 kg \cdot 4186 \frac{J}{kg \cdot ^{\circ} C}} = .012 ^{\circ} C$) of short-wave solar radiation back into space, cooling the Earth by around 12 °C (22 °F), an effect largely caused by stratocumulus clouds. However, at the same time, they reflect around 30 watts per square meter of long-wave (infrared) black body radiation emitted by the Earth back to Earth's surface, heating the Earth by around 7 °C (13 °F)—a process called the greenhouse effect. Cirrus and altostratus clouds are the top two sources of this heating effect. This combination of heating and cooling sums out to a net loss of 20 watts per square meter globally, cooling the Earth by roughly 5 °C (9.0 °F).

Altostratus clouds are the only cloud genus besides cirrus clouds to exhibit a net global heating effect on Earth and its atmosphere; however, cirrus have a heating effect that is four times as potent as altostratus (2 watts per square meter versus only 0.5 watts per square meter).

== Optical phenomena ==
Altostratus clouds can produce bright halos when viewed from the air, but not when viewed from the ground. Halos can take the appearance of rings, arcs, or spots of white or multicolored light and are formed by the reflection and refraction of sunlight or moonlight shining through ice crystals in the cloud. Light diffraction through altostratus clouds can also produce coronas, which are small, concentric pastel-colored rings of light around the sun or moon. They can also be iridescent, with often-parallel bands of bright color projected on a cloud. Unlike the halos, the coronas and iridescence can be seen from Earth's surface.

== Relation to other clouds ==
Heights of various cloud genera including high-, mid-, and low-level clouds

Altostratus and altocumulus clouds are the two genera of mid-level clouds that usually form between 2,000 and 6,100 m (6,500 and 20,000 ft). These are given the prefix "alto-". These clouds are formed from ice crystals, supercooled water droplets, or liquid water droplets.

Above the mid-level clouds are three different genera of high-level clouds, cirrus, cirrocumulus, and cirrostratus, all of which are given the prefix "cirro-". High-level clouds usually form above 6,100 m (20,000 ft). Cirrocumulus and cirrostratus are sometimes informally referred to as cirriform clouds because of their frequent association with cirrus.

Below the mid-level clouds are the low-level clouds, which usually form below 2,000 m (6,500 ft) and do not have a prefix. The two genera that are strictly low-level are stratus, and stratocumulus. These clouds are composed of water droplets, except during winter when they are formed of supercooled water droplets or ice crystals if the temperature at cloud level is below freezing. Three additional genera usually form in the low altitude range, but may be based at higher levels under conditions of very low humidity. They are the genera cumulus, and cumulonimbus, and nimbostratus. These are sometimes classified separately as clouds of vertical development, especially when their tops are high enough to be composed of supercooled water droplets or ice crystals.

=== Cirrostratus ===
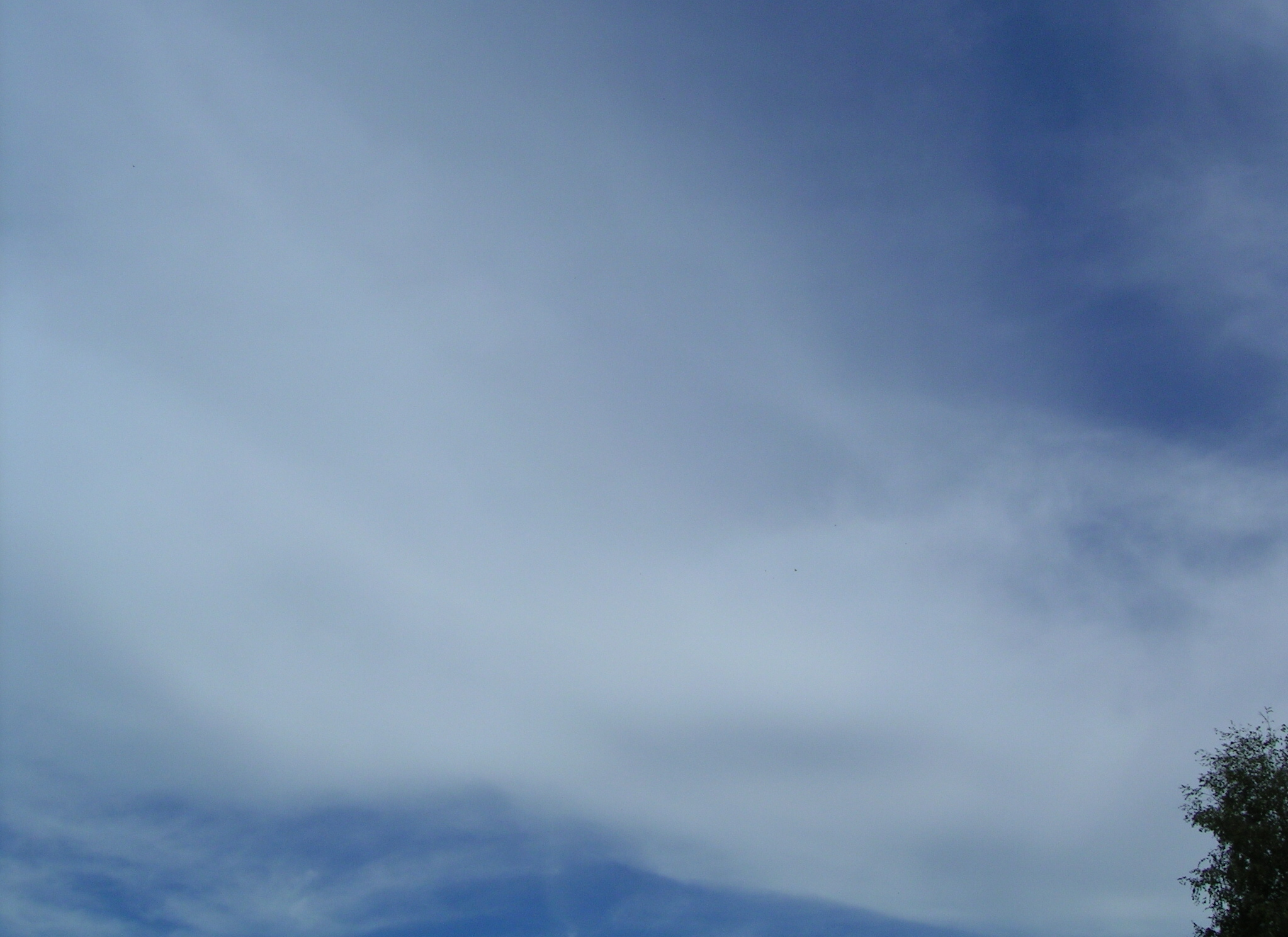
Cirrostratus cloud

Cirrostratus clouds can appear as a smooth veil in the sky or as a striated sheet. They are sometimes similar to altostratus and are distinguishable from the latter because the sun or moon is always clearly visible through transparent cirrostratus, in contrast to altostratus which tends to be opaque or translucent. Cirrostratus come in two species, fibratus and nebulosus. The ice crystals in these clouds vary depending upon the height in the cloud. Towards the bottom, at temperatures of around −35 to −45 °C (−31 to −49 °F), the crystals tend to be long, solid, hexagonal columns. Towards the top of the cloud, at temperatures of around −47 to −52 °C (−53 to −62 °F), the predominant crystal types are thick, hexagonal plates and short, solid, hexagonal columns. These clouds commonly produce halos, and sometimes the halo is the only indication that such clouds are present. They are formed by warm, moist air being lifted slowly to a very high altitude. When a warm front approaches, cirrostratus clouds become thicker and descend forming altostratus clouds, and rain usually begins 12 to 24 hours later.

=== Altocumulus ===
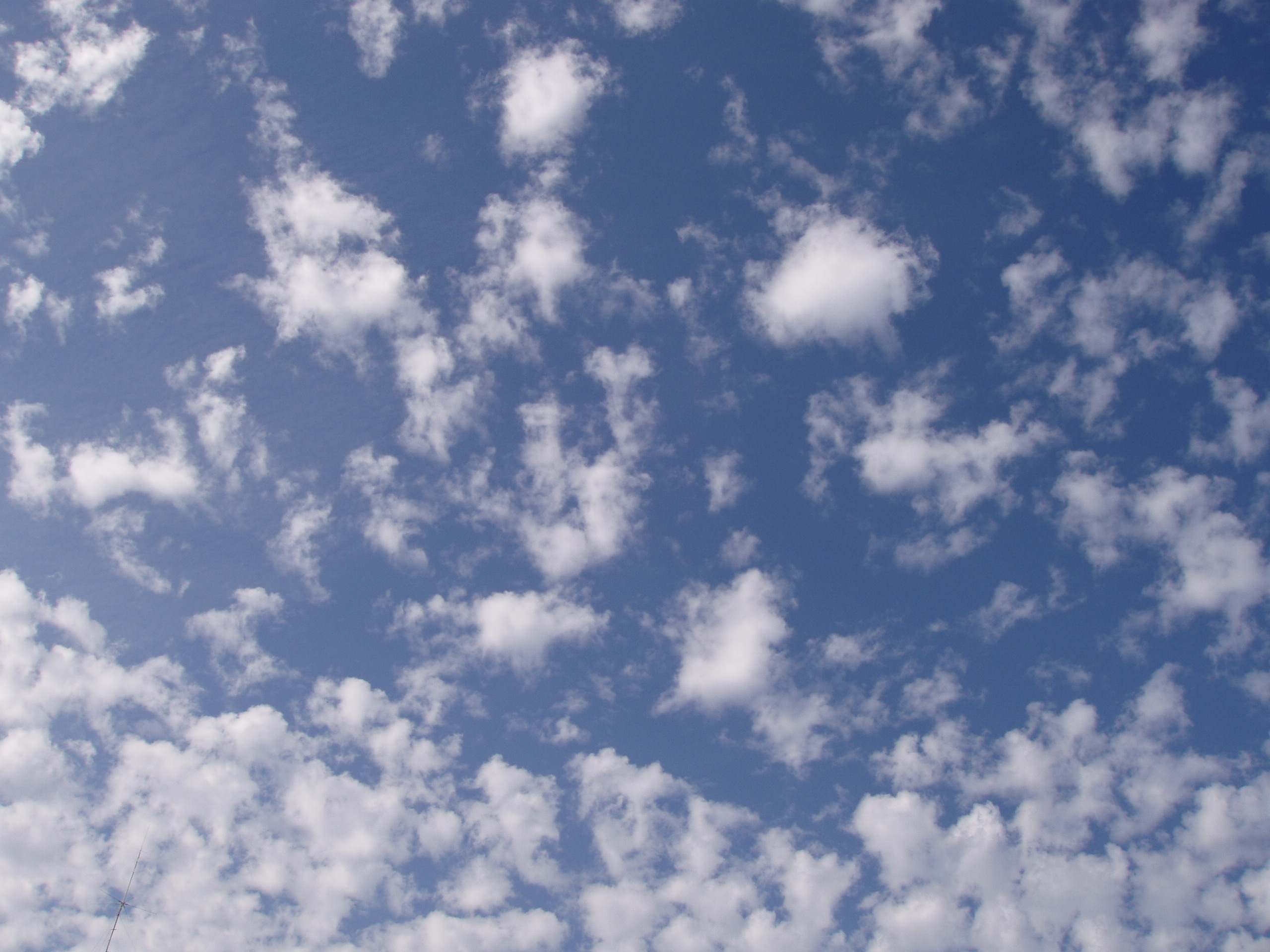
Altocumulus clouds

Altocumulus clouds are small patches or heaps of white or light gray cloud. Like altostratus, altocumulus are composed of a mixture of water droplets, supercooled water droplets, and ice crystals. Although altocumulus clouds are mid-level clouds that form at roughly the same altitude as altostratus clouds, their formation methods are completely different. Altocumulus forms from convective (rising) processes, whereas altostratus is usually formed by descending and thickening cirrostratus.

=== Stratus ===
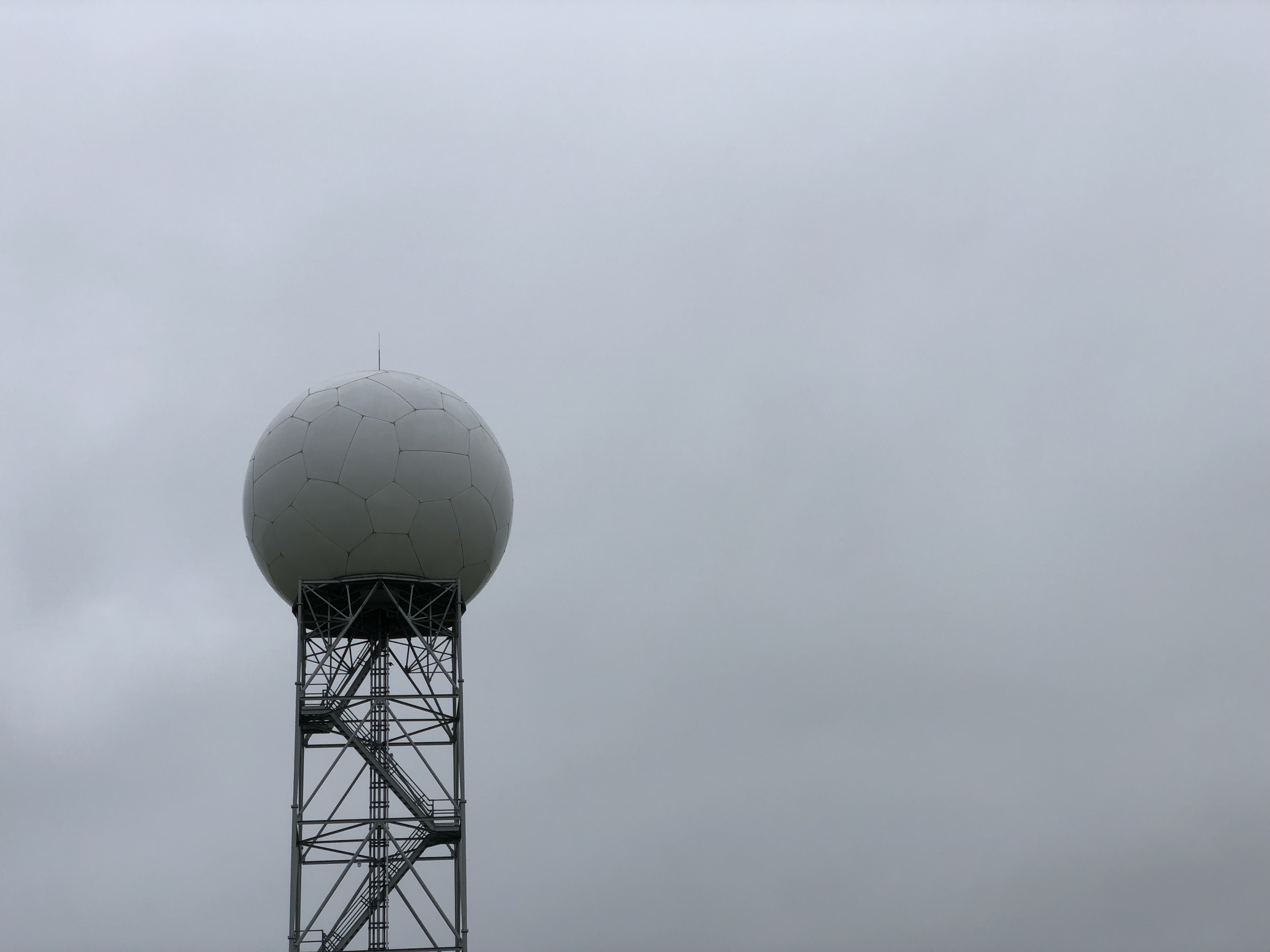
Stratus cloud

Stratus are low-level clouds that are usually visually similar to altostratus. Stratus comes in two species: nebulosus, a largely featureless flat gray cloud sheet, and fractus, shattered fragments of cloud often called "scud". Opaque varieties of altostratus and stratus nebulosus clouds can be virtually indistinguishable from each other to the naked eye, to the point that the World Meteorological Organization suggests that one of the few ways to distinguish between these clouds is to check what types of clouds came before them. Altostratus clouds, because they tend to form from warm fronts, are usually preceded by high-level cirriform clouds. Stratus clouds tend to form by cooling air masses, often at night, and thus are not usually preceded by other types of clouds.

=== Nimbostratus ===
Nimbostratus are low-level (sometimes classified as vertical) rain-bearing stratus clouds. Unlike the sprinkles or light drizzles that altostratus or stratus can produce, nimbostratus produces heavy, continuous rain or snow. These clouds are thick and dark enough to entirely blot out the sun. Nimbostratus has no species or varieties. Like altostratus, nimbostratus clouds can be made of ice crystals, supercooled water droplets, or water droplets.

== Gallery ==
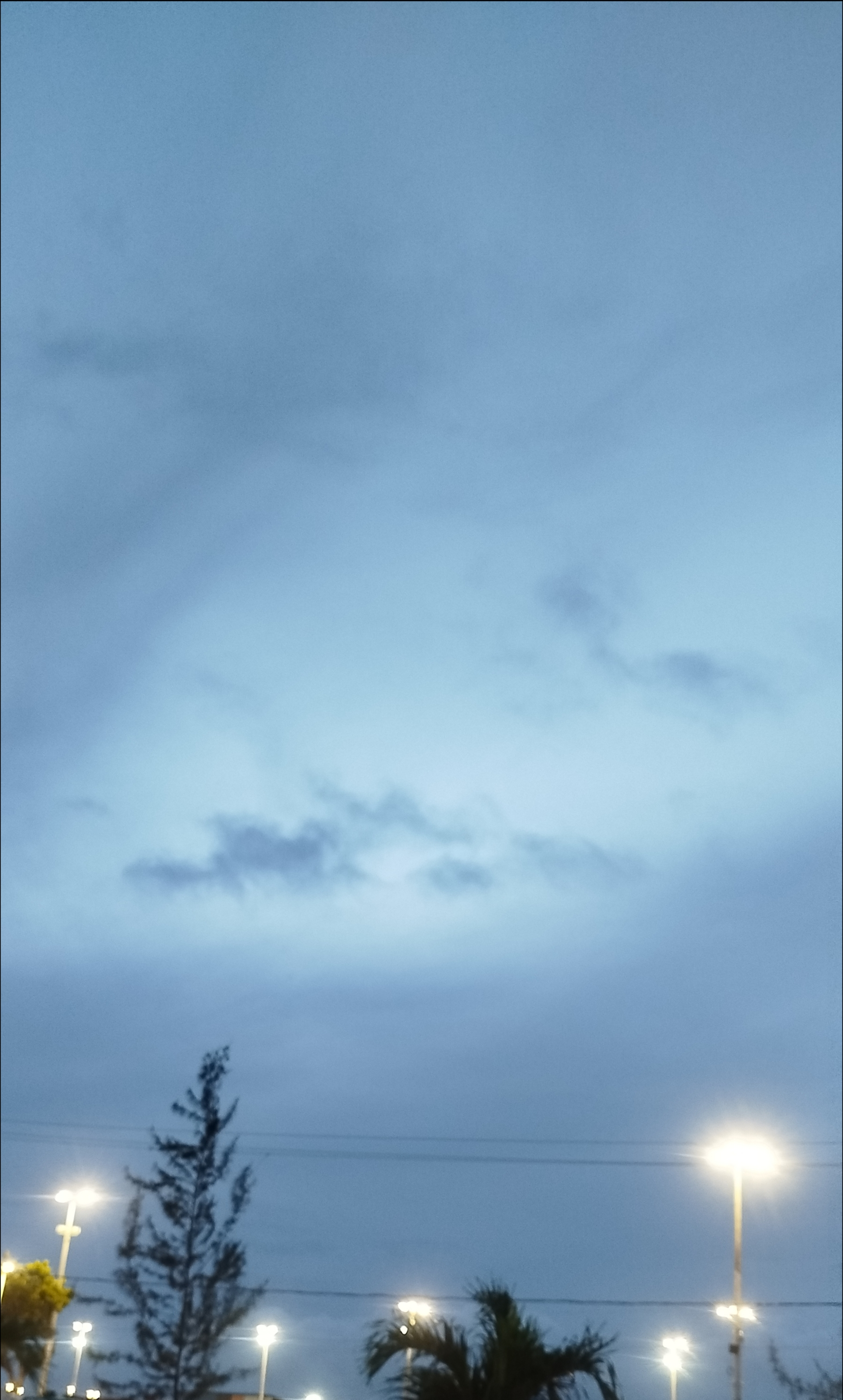
Altostratus pannus nimbostratomutatus

== See also ==
- List of cloud types

== Sources ==
Footnotes

Bibliography

- Ahrens, C. Donald (February 2006). Meteorology Today: An Introduction to Weather, Climate, and the Environment (8th ed.). Brooks Cole. ISBN 978-0-495-01162-0. OCLC 693475796.
- Cohn, Stephen; Bruhn, Michael; Anderson, George; Atkinson, Roger; Campos, Marinés; Galati, Federico; Lovell, Ernest; Rae, Colleen; Rüedi, Isabelle; Tam, Kwong Hung; Thürig-Jenzer, Eliane; Trice, Jim (2017). International Cloud Atlas. World Meteorological Organization.
- Danne, O.; Quante, M.; Milferstädt, D.; Lemke, H.; Raschke, E. (February 1999). "Relationships between Doppler Spectral Moments within Large-Scale Cirro- and Altostratus Cloud Fields Observed by a Ground-Based 95-GHz Cloud Radar". Journal of Applied Meteorology and Climatology. 38 (2). American Meteorological Society: 175–189. Bibcode:1999JApMe..38..175D. doi:10.1175/1520-0450(1999)038<0175:RBDSMW>2.0.CO;2.
- Day, John A. (August 2005). The Book of Clouds. Sterling. ISBN 978-1-4027-2813-6. OCLC 61240837.
- Field, Paul R. (June 1999). "Aircraft Observations of Ice Crystal Evolution in an Altostratus Cloud". Journal of Applied Meteorology. 56 (12): 1925–1941. Bibcode:1999JAtS...56.1925F. doi:10.1175/1520-0469(1999)056<1925:AOOICE>2.0.CO;2. ISSN 1520-0469.
- Hamilton, Gina (1 September 2007). Blue Planet – Air (eBook). Milliken Publishing. ISBN 978-1-4291-1613-8.
- Hang, Yun; L'Ecuyer, Tristan; Henderson, David; Matus, Alexander; Wang, Zhien (1 October 2019). "Reassessing the Effect of Cloud Type on Earth's Energy Balance in the Age of Active Spaceborne Observations. Part II: Atmospheric Heating". Journal of Climate. 32 (19). American Meteorological Society: 6219–6236. Bibcode:2019JCli...32.6219H. doi:10.1175/JCLI-D-18-0754.1.
- Hubbard, Richard Keith (5 May 2000). "Glossary". Boater's Bowditch: The Small Craft American Practical Navigator (2nd ed.). International Marine/Ragged Mountain Press. ISBN 978-0-07-136136-1.
- "Altostratus Cloud (in Atmospheric Chemistry)" (PDF). IUPAC Compendium of Chemical Terminology (2 ed.). International Union of Pure and Applied Chemistry (IUPAC). 1997. Archived from the original (PDF) on 4 March 2016.
- L'Ecuyer, Tristan; Hang, Yun; Matus, Alexander; Wang, Zhien (1 October 2019). "Reassessing the Effect of Cloud Type on Earth's Energy Balance in the Age of Active Spaceborne Observations. Part I: Top of Atmosphere and Surface". Journal of Climate. 32 (19). American Meteorological Society: 6197–6217. Bibcode:2019JCli...32.6197L. doi:10.1175/JCLI-D-18-0753.1.
- Parungo, F. (May 1995). "Ice Crystals in High Clouds and Contrails". Atmospheric Research. 38 (1–4): 249–262. Bibcode:1995AtmRe..38..249P. doi:10.1016/0169-8095(94)00096-V. OCLC 90987092.
- Platt, C. M. R. (April 1977). "Lidar Observation of a Mixed-Phase Altostratus Cloud". Journal of Applied Meteorology. 16 (4): 339–345. Bibcode:1977JApMe..16..339P. doi:10.1175/1520-0450(1977)016<0339:LOOAMP>2.0.CO;2. ISSN 0021-8952.
- Sassen, Kenneth; Wang, Zhien (2012). "The Clouds of the Middle Troposphere: Composition, Radiative Impact, and Global Distribution". Surveys in Geophysics. 33 (3–4): 677–691. Bibcode:2012SGeo...33..677S. doi:10.1007/s10712-011-9163-x. S2CID 129776090.
- Warren, Stephen G.; Hahn, Carol J.; London, Julius; Chervin, Robert M.; Jenne, Roy L. (December 1988). "Global Distribution of Total Cloud Cover and Cloud Type Amounts over the Ocean". Office of Energy Research. United States Department of Energy. doi:10.2172/5415329. OSTI 5415329.
- Yang, S.; Zou, X. (15 August 2013). "Temperature Profiles and Lapse Rate Climatology in Altostratus and Nimbostratus Clouds Derived from GPS RO Data". Journal of Climate. 26 (16). American Meteorological Society: 6000–6014. Bibcode:2013JCli...26.6000Y. doi:10.1175/JCLI-D-12-00646.1.
