= Altocumulus volutus =

Relatively rare type of cloud formation

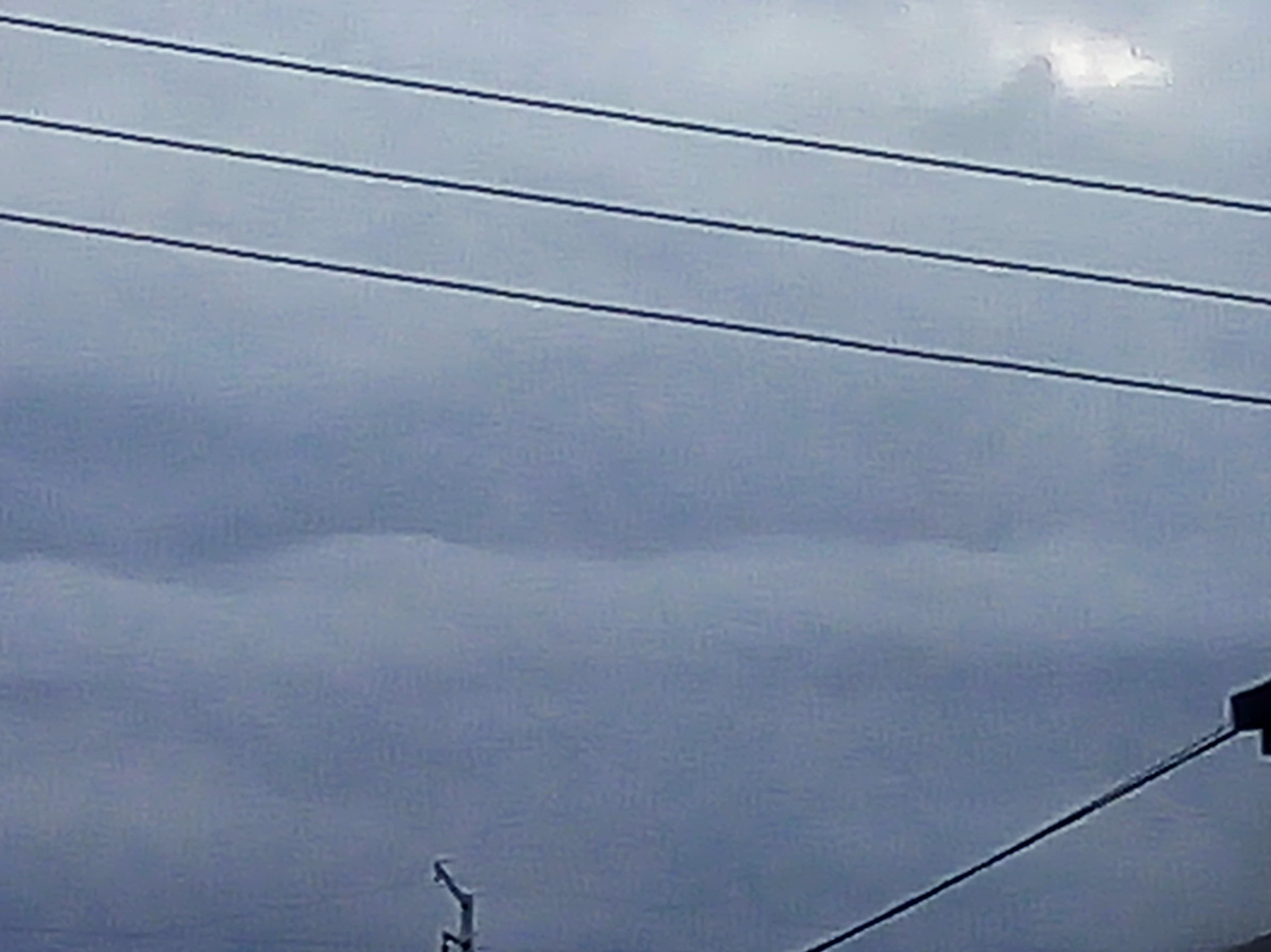
- Distant altocumulus volutus cloud
- Abbreviation: Ac vol
- Genus: Altocumulus
- Species: Volutus
- Altitude: 2,000-7,000 m (7,000-23,000 ft)
- Appearance: small, single, horizontal, rolling mid-level altocumulus line
- Precipitation: None

Altocumulus volutus is a type of altocumulus cloud. This cloud type has the appearance of a single, small, horizontal, rolling line, it is relatively rare compared with its counterpart stratocumulus volutus, This cloud does not attach to any other cloud. It may or may not appear with altocumulus clouds of different species. When found in a thunderstorm, it forms when cold air from a thunderstorm's downdraft makes the already present warm and moist air rise, expanding and cooling as it rises. It then condenses, although the most likely scenario is that it condenses into a shelf cloud or roll cloud, rather than an altocumulus volutus cloud. When found in environments where it is not associated with a thunderstorm, it forms because of wind shear (difference of wind speed and direction between the mid-levels of the atmosphere and the surface).
