= Stationary front =

Weather front

Stationary front symbol: solid line of alternating blue spikes pointing to the warmer air mass and red domes pointing to the colder air mass

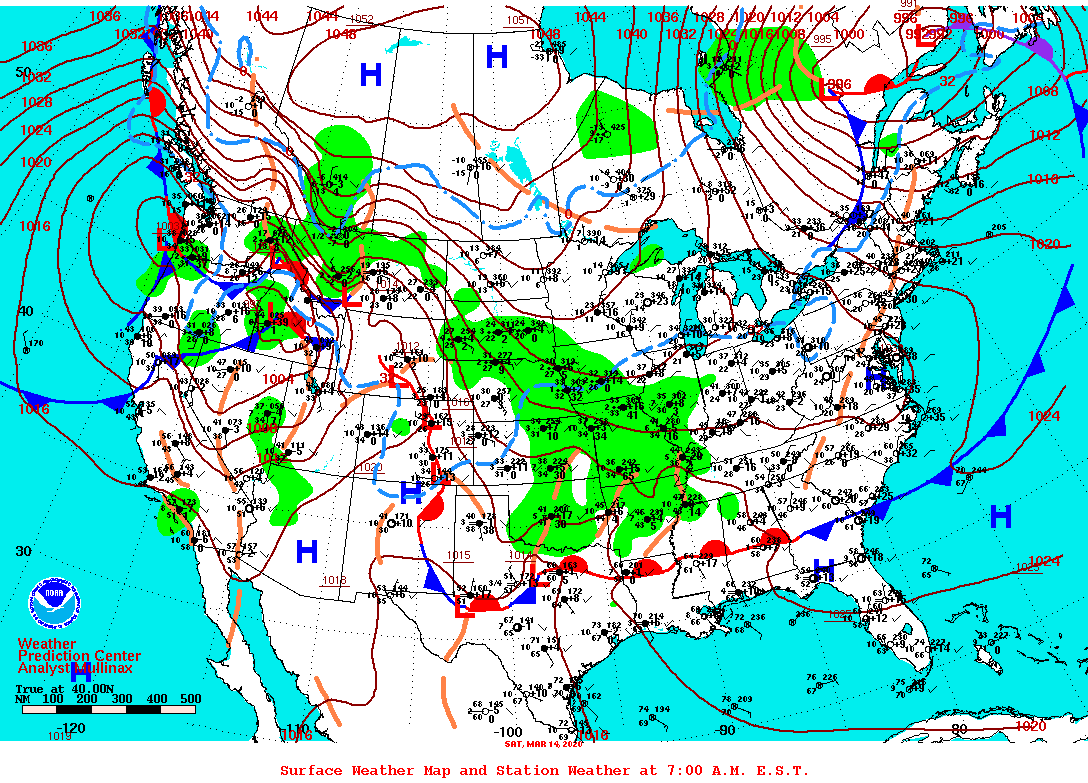

A stationary front (or quasi-stationary front) is a weather front or transition zone between two air masses when each air mass is advancing into the other at speeds less than 5 knots (6 mph; 9 km/h) at the ground surface. These fronts are typically depicted on weather maps as a solid line with alternating blue spikes (pointing toward the warmer air) and red domes (facing the colder air).

== Development ==
A stationary front may form when a cold or warm front slows down or grows over time from underlying surface temperature differences, like a coastal front. Winds on the cold air and warm air sides often flow nearly parallel to the stationary front, often in opposite directions along either side of the stationary front. A stationary front usually remains in the same area for hours to days and may undulate as atmospheric waves move eastward along the front.

Stationary fronts may change into a cold or warm front, and may form one or more extratropical or mid-latitude cyclones at the surface when atmospheric waves aloft are fiercer, or when cold or warm air masses advance fast enough into other air masses at the surface. For instance, when a cold air mass traverses sufficiently quick into a warm air mass, the stationary front changes into a cold front.

There are frequently variations in wind and air temperature on opposing sides of a stationary front because it delineates the boundary between two air masses. Along a stationary front, the weather is typically overcast with rain or snow, particularly if the front is in an area of low air pressure.

== Characteristics ==
A warm front is a slow-moving air mass that displaces a cold air mass. Warm fronts typically move at speeds of 10 to 25 miles per hour (16–40 km/h), and clouds form as warm air is lifted up, then cooled and condensed to form clouds. A warm front may bring persistent precipitation, fog, and cloudy skies, signaling the start of wet weather. Sleet can also form when a warm front meets an extremely cold air mass, cooling the air below. On the other hand, cold fronts move faster than warm fronts, at speeds of 25 to 30 miles per hour (40 to 48 km/h), and sometimes up to 60 miles per hour (97 km/h). Cold fronts can cause rapid changes in weather. When a cold front moves into an area, it brings with it a drop in temperatures, which can lead to thunderstorms. These can cause big changes in the weather.

Although the stationary front's position may not move, there is air motion as warm air rises up and over the cold air, responsive to the geostrophic induced by frontogenesis. A wide variety of weather may occur along a stationary front. If one or both air masses are humid enough, cloudy skies and prolonged precipitation are recurring, with storm trains or mesocyclone systems. When the warmer air mass is very moist, heavy or extreme rain or snow can occur.

Stationary fronts may dissipate after several days or devolve into shear lines. A stationary front becomes a shear line when air density contrast across the front vanishes, usually because of temperature equalization, while the narrow wind shift zone persists for some time. That is most common over open oceans, where the ocean surface temperature is similar on both sides of the front and modifies both air masses to correspond to its temperature. That sometimes also provides enough heat energy and moisture to form subtropical storms and tropical cyclones at the surface.
