= Occluded front =

Meteorological interaction of warm and cool air masses

Diagram of a cyclone in the early stages of occlusion in the Northern Hemisphere

In meteorology, an occluded front is a type of weather front formed during cyclogenesis. The classical and usual view of an occluded front is that it starts when a cold front overtakes a warm front near a cyclone, such that the warm air is separated (occluded) from the cyclone center at the surface. The point where the warm front becomes the occluded front is the triple point; a new area of low-pressure that develops at this point is called a triple-point low. A more modern view of the formation process suggests that occluded fronts form directly without the influence of other fronts during the wrap-up of the baroclinic zone during cyclogenesis, and then lengthen due to flow deformation and rotation around the cyclone as the cyclone forms.

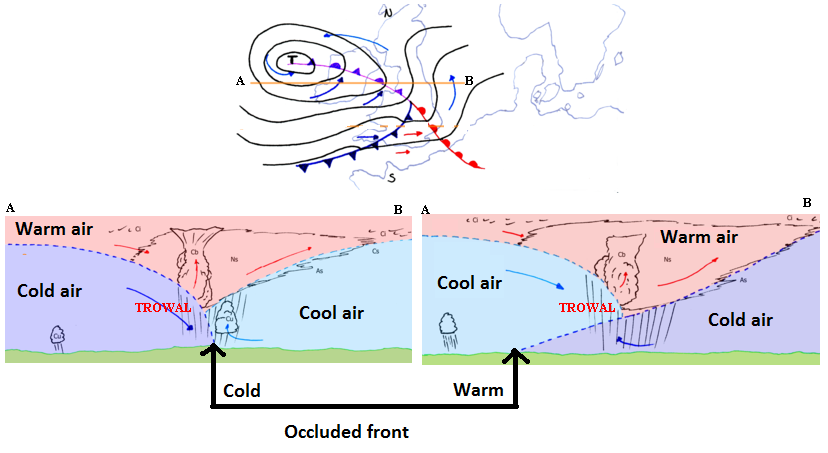
Occlusion principle with positions of warm/cold occlusion fronts and the trowal

== Features and variants ==
Occluded fronts usually form around mature low pressure areas. There are two types of front occlusions, warm and cold, depending on the temperature contrast:

- In a cold occlusion, the cold air mass that overtakes the warm air mass ahead is colder than the cool air at the very front and plows under both air masses, and often has the characteristics of a cold front.
- In a warm occlusion, the cool air mass overtaking the warm front is warmer than the cold air ahead of the warm air mass and rides over the colder air mass while lifting the warm air, and often has the characteristics of a warm front.

The occluded front symbol should show where the cold air intersects the surface. It thus varies between warm and cold occlusions. The TROWAL (short for trough of warm air aloft), is the estimated projection of the wedge of warm air above the surface, and is at the same position in both cases. Consequently, the location of the occluded front appearing in the surface weather analysis is often offset from the range of the associated weather which occurs at the TROWAL. The TROWAL, is primarily found with a connection to the warm occlusion, and are rarely seen in cold occlusion.

== Related weather ==
One symbol of an occluded front is the TROWAL symbol with alternating blue and red lines similar to a cold/warm front junction

A cold front is diagrammed as blue spikes pointing to its direction of travel. A warm front is shown as red semi-circles in a traditional weather map, also pointing to its direction of travel. An occluded front is a combination of those two signs: they are indicated on a weather map either by a purple line with alternating semicircles and triangles pointing to the direction of travel, or by red semicircles and blue triangles pointing to the direction of travel. On the other hand, a TROWAL is diagrammed on weather maps by the junction of blue and red lines like the junction of cold and warm fronts aloft.

A wide variety of weather can be found along an occluded front, with heavy thunderstorms and tornadoes possible, but usually, their passage is instead associated with a drying of the air mass. Additionally, cold core funnel clouds are possible if the wind shear is significant along the cold front. Small isolated occluded fronts often remain for a period after a low-pressure system has decayed and disappeared and these create cloudy conditions with patchy areas of rain or showers.

However, the clouds and precipitation are not really the location where the projection on the Earth's surface of the occluded front is, but it is with the TROWAL position.

== See also ==
- Cyclone
- Extratropical cyclone
- Stationary front
- Surface weather analysis
