= Stratocumulus cloud =

Family class 3 cloud type

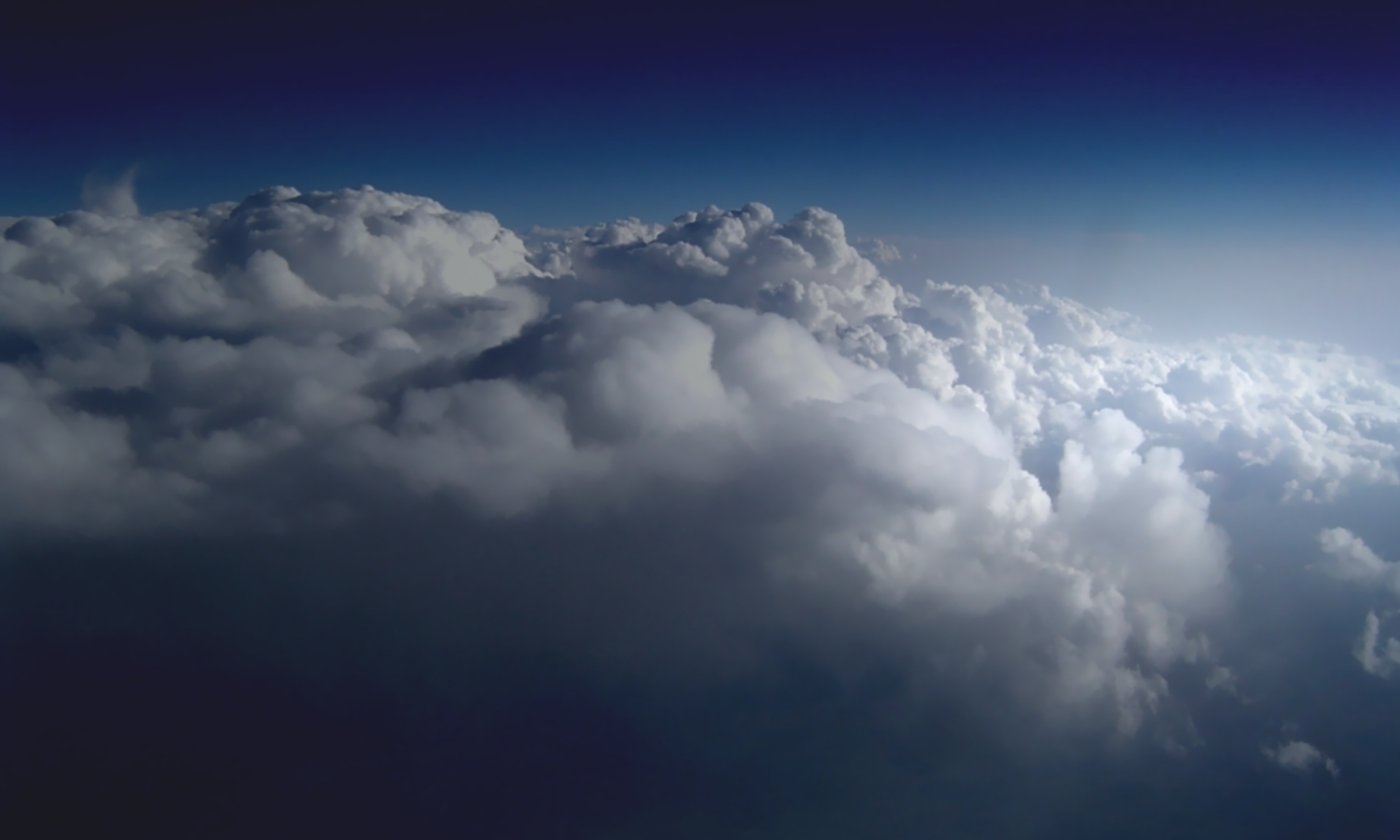
- Aerial photograph of Stratocumulus perlucidus clouds over the midwestern United States
- Abbreviation: Sc
- Genus: Stratocumulus (layer heap)
- Species: Castellanus; Floccus; Lenticularis; Stratiformis; Volutus
- Variety: Duplicatus; Lacunosus; Opacus; Perlucidus; Radiatus; Translucidus; Undulatus
- Altitude: 500-2,000 m (2,000-7,000 ft)
- Classification: Family C (Low-level)
- Appearance: Thicker, dark gray, and somewhat conjoined heaps of clouds
- Precipitation: Uncommon Rain, Snow or Snow pellets

A stratocumulus cloud [Kämtz 1840], occasionally called a cumulostratus, belongs to a genus-type of clouds characterized by large dark, rounded masses, usually in groups, lines, or waves, the individual elements being larger than those in altocumulus, and the whole being at a lower height, usually below 2,000 metres (6,600 ft). Weak convective currents create shallow cloud layers (see also: sea of clouds) because of drier, stable air above preventing continued vertical development. Historically, in English, this type of cloud has been referred to as a twain cloud for being a combination of two types of clouds.

== Description ==
Stratocumulus clouds are rounded clumps or patches of white to dark gray clouds that normally form in groups. The individual cloud elements, which cover more than 5 degrees of arc each, can connect with each other and are sometimes arranged in a regular pattern.

=== Occurrence ===
Vast areas of subtropical and polar oceans are covered with massive sheets of stratocumulus. These may organize into distinctive patterns which are currently under active study. In subtropics, they cover the edges of the horse latitude climatological highs, and reduce the amount of solar energy absorbed in the ocean. When these drift over land the summer heat or winter cold is reduced. 'Dull weather' is a common expression incorporated with overcast stratocumulus days, which usually occur either in a warm sector between a warm and cold front in a depression, or in an area of high pressure, in the latter case, sometimes persisting over a specific area for several days. If the air over land is moist and hot enough, stratocumulus may develop to various cumulus clouds, or, more commonly, the sheet of stratocumulus may become thick enough to produce some light rain. On drier areas they quickly dissipate over land, resembling cumulus humilis. This often occurs in late morning in areas under anticyclonic weather, the stratocumulus breaking up under the sun's heat and often reforming again by evening as the heat of the sun decreases again.

=== Precipitation ===
Most often, stratocumulus produce no precipitation, and when they do, it is generally only light rain or snow. However, these clouds are often seen at either the front or tail end of worse weather, so they may indicate storms to come, in the form of thunderheads or gusty winds. They are also often seen underneath the cirrostratus and altostratus sheets that often precede a warm front, as these higher clouds decrease the sun's heat and therefore convection, causing any cumulus clouds to spread out into stratocumulus clouds.

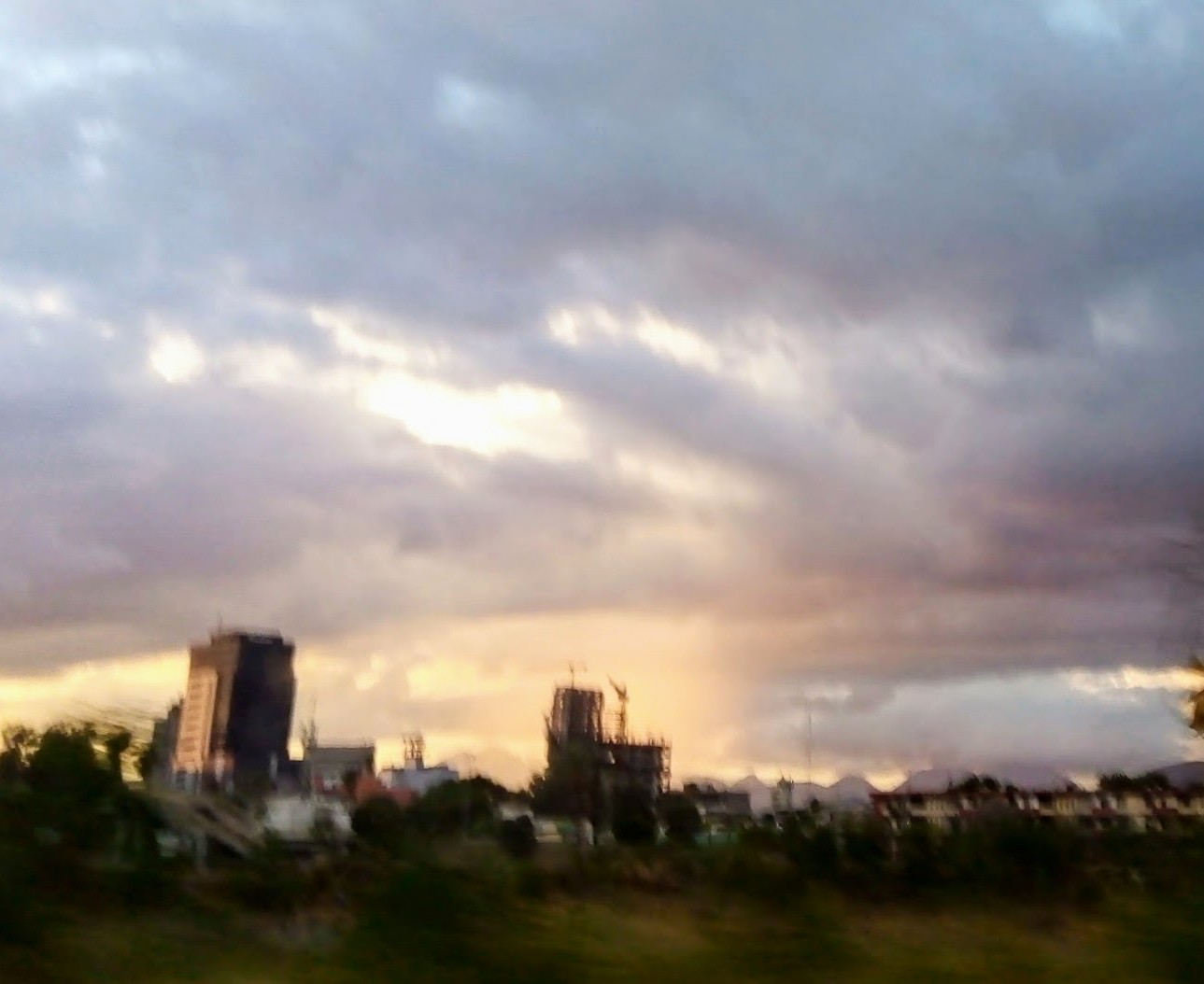
Rain from stratocumulus cloud cover

=== Comparison with altocumulus ===
Stratocumulus clouds are similar in appearance to altocumulus and can be mistaken for such. A simple test to distinguish these is to compare the size of individual masses or rolls: when pointing one's hand in the direction of the cloud, if the cloud is about the size of the thumb, it is altocumulus; if it is the size of one's fist, it is stratocumulus. This often does not apply when stratocumulus is of a broken, fractus form, when it may appear as small as altocumulus.

=== Optical effects ===
Stratocumulus clouds are the main type of cloud that can produce crepuscular rays. Thin stratocumulus clouds are also often the cause of corona effects around the Moon at night. All stratocumulus subtypes are coded C_{L}5 except when formed from free convective mother clouds (C_{L}4) or when formed separately from co-existing (C_{L}8).

== Formation ==
Stratocumulus clouds usually form from the rising and breakup of a stratus cloud. They can also form from altostratus and nimbostratus clouds, either as evaporating precipitation condenses into a cloud or as the nimbostratus cloud itself thins and breaks up. If a cumulus cloud becomes flattened (for example, by wind shear or temperature inversion), it too can become a stratocumulus cloud.

== Species ==
Stratocumulus Stratiformis are extensive flat but slightly lumpy sheets that show only minimal convective activity.

Stratocumulus Lenticularis are separate flat elongated seed-shaped clouds. They are typical for polar countries or warmer climate during winter seasons. They also can be formed by winds passing hills or mountains, such as Foehn winds, and in this case they can be very regularly shaped.

Stratocumulus Castellanus have stronger convective activity due to the presence of increasingly unstable air. They are distinct from other stratocumulus by puffy tower-like formations atop the cloud layer. They look like cumulus congestus, but can be easily confused: "towers" of cumulus congestus grow above separate clouds, whereas in the case of stratocumulus castellanus, there is always a more or less defined layer of clouds. Stratocumulus castellanus may develop into cumulus congestus under auspicious conditions. Any showers from stratocumulus castellanus are not usually as heavy as those from cumulus congestus.

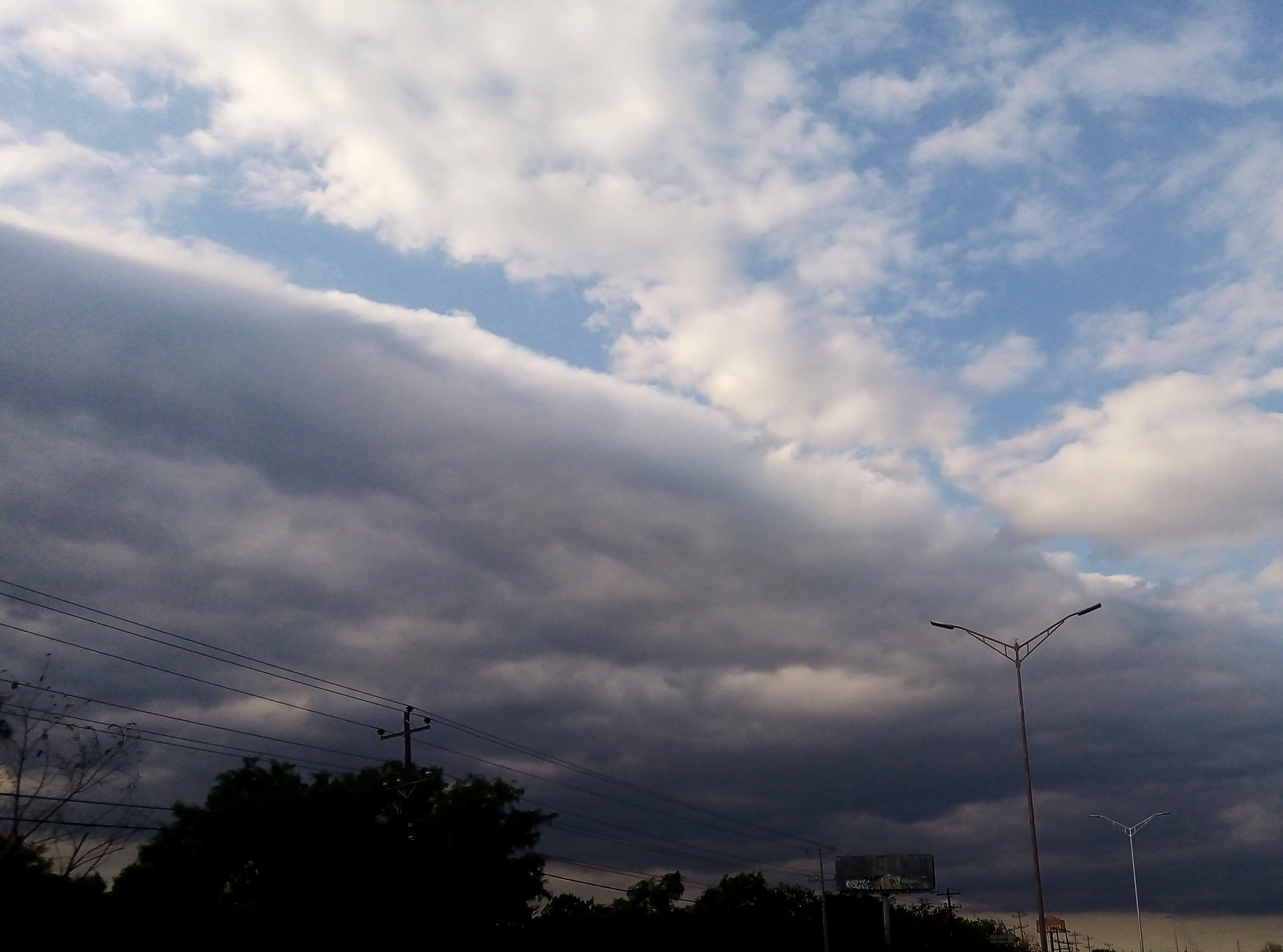
Stratocumulus stratiformis

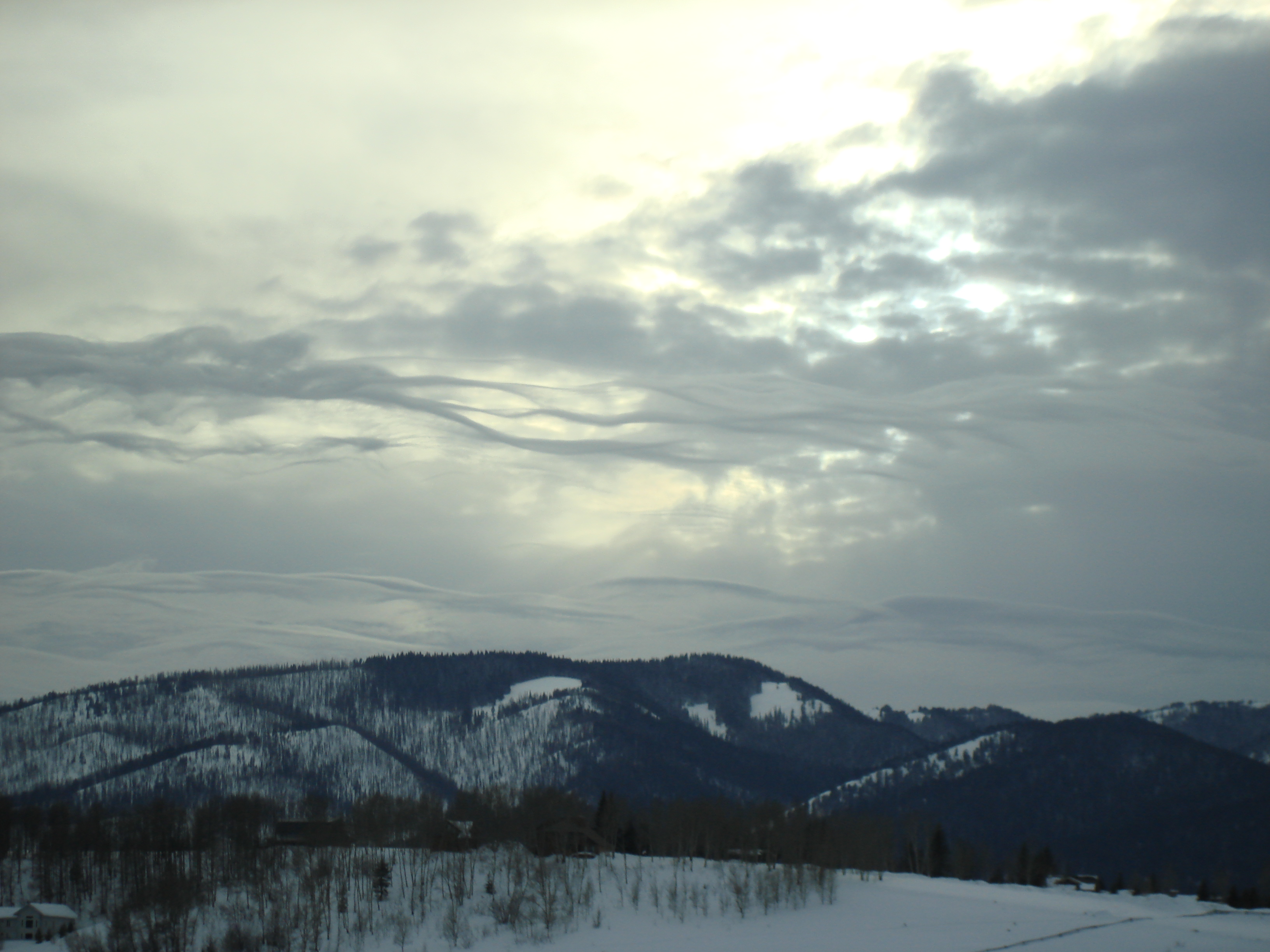
Stratocumulus lenticularis

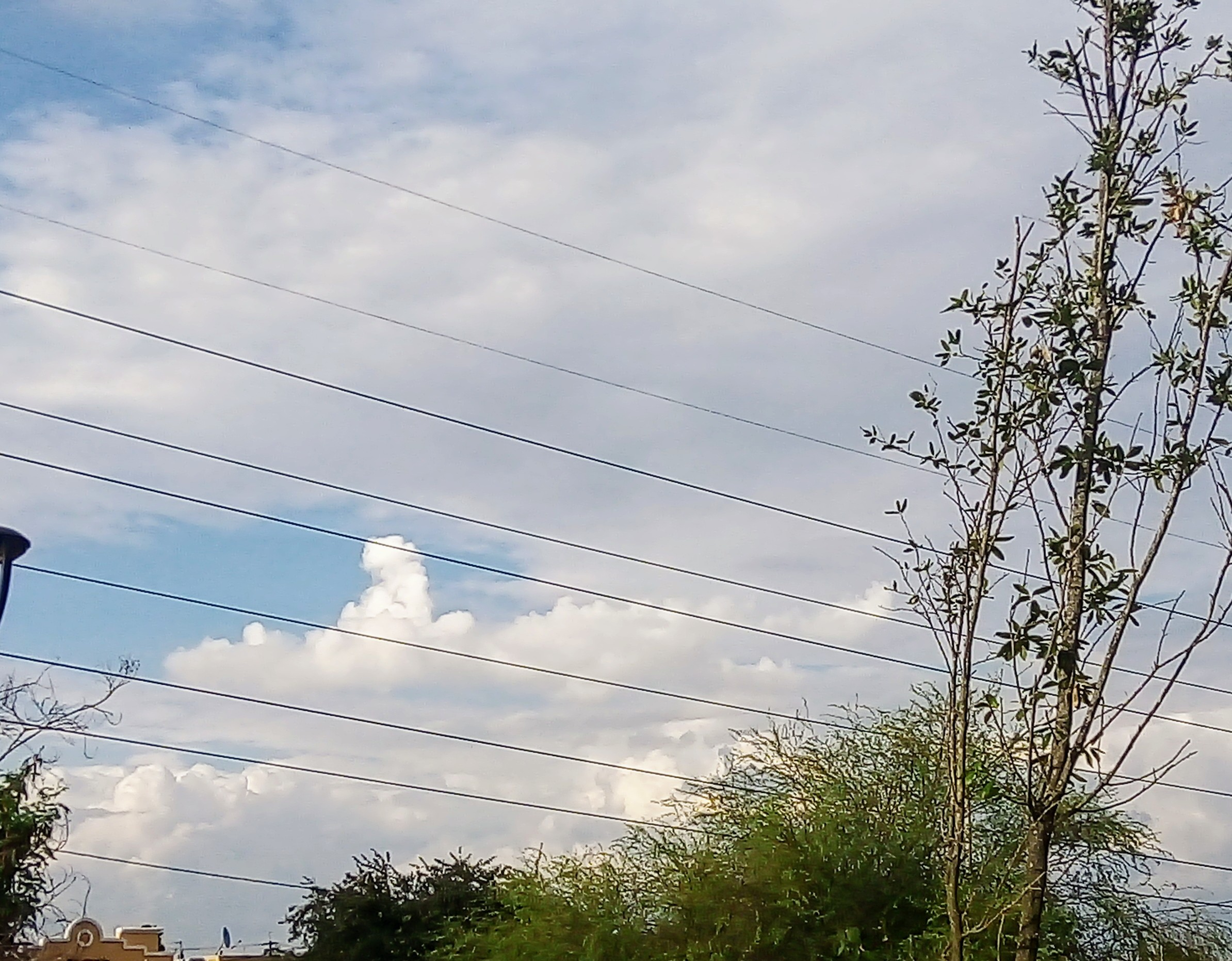
Stratocumulus castellanus

== Opacity-based varieties ==
Stratocumulus Opacus is a dark layer of clouds covering entire sky without any break. However, the cloud sheet is not completely uniform, so that separate cloud bases still can be seen. This is the main precipitating type, however any rain is usually light. If the cloud layer becomes grayer to the point when individual clouds cannot be distinguished, cold front stratocumulus turn into stratus clouds.

Stratocumulus Perlucidus is a layer of stratocumulus clouds with small spaces, appearing in irregular pattern, through which clear sky or higher clouds can be seen.

Stratocumulus Translucidus consist of separate groups of stratocumulus clouds, with a clear sky (or higher clouds) visible between them. No precipitation in most cases.

== Pattern-based varieties ==
Stratocumulus Undulatus clouds appear as nearly parallel waves, rolls or separate elongated clouds, without significant vertical development.

Stratocumulus Radiatus clouds appear as the same as stratocumulus undulatus, but stratocumulus undulatus move perpendicular to the wind shear, while stratocumulus radiatus move parallel to the wind shear.

Stratocumulus Duplicatus clouds appear as stratocumulus clouds with two or more layers or sheets. Stratocumulus duplicatus is common on species lenticularis or lenticular cloud.

Stratocumulus Lacunosus clouds are very uncommon. They only occur when there are localized downdrafts striking through the stratocumuliform cloud.

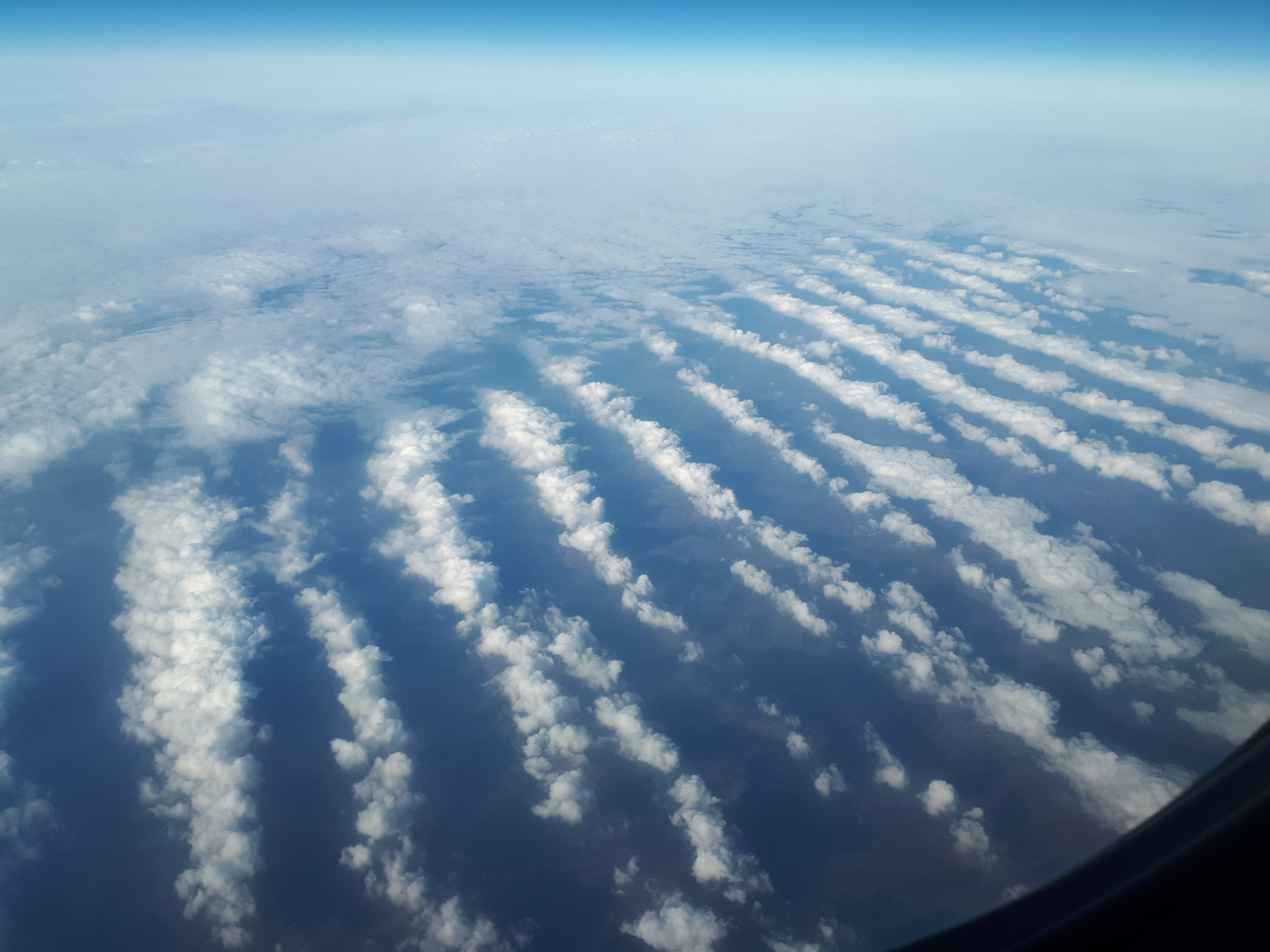
Stratocumulus undulatus clouds, seen from an airplane

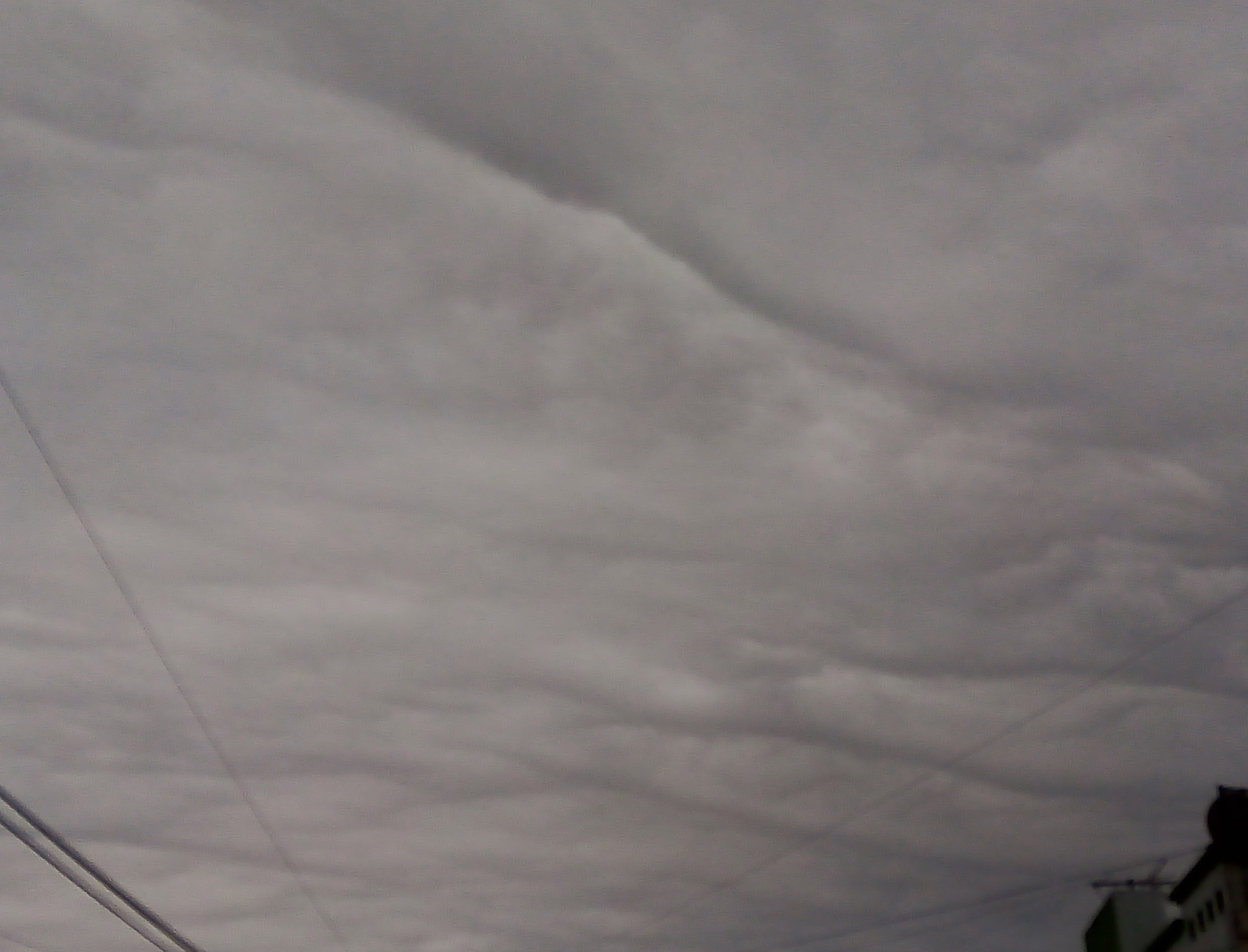
Stratocumulus undulatus asperitas clouds, seen from Earth

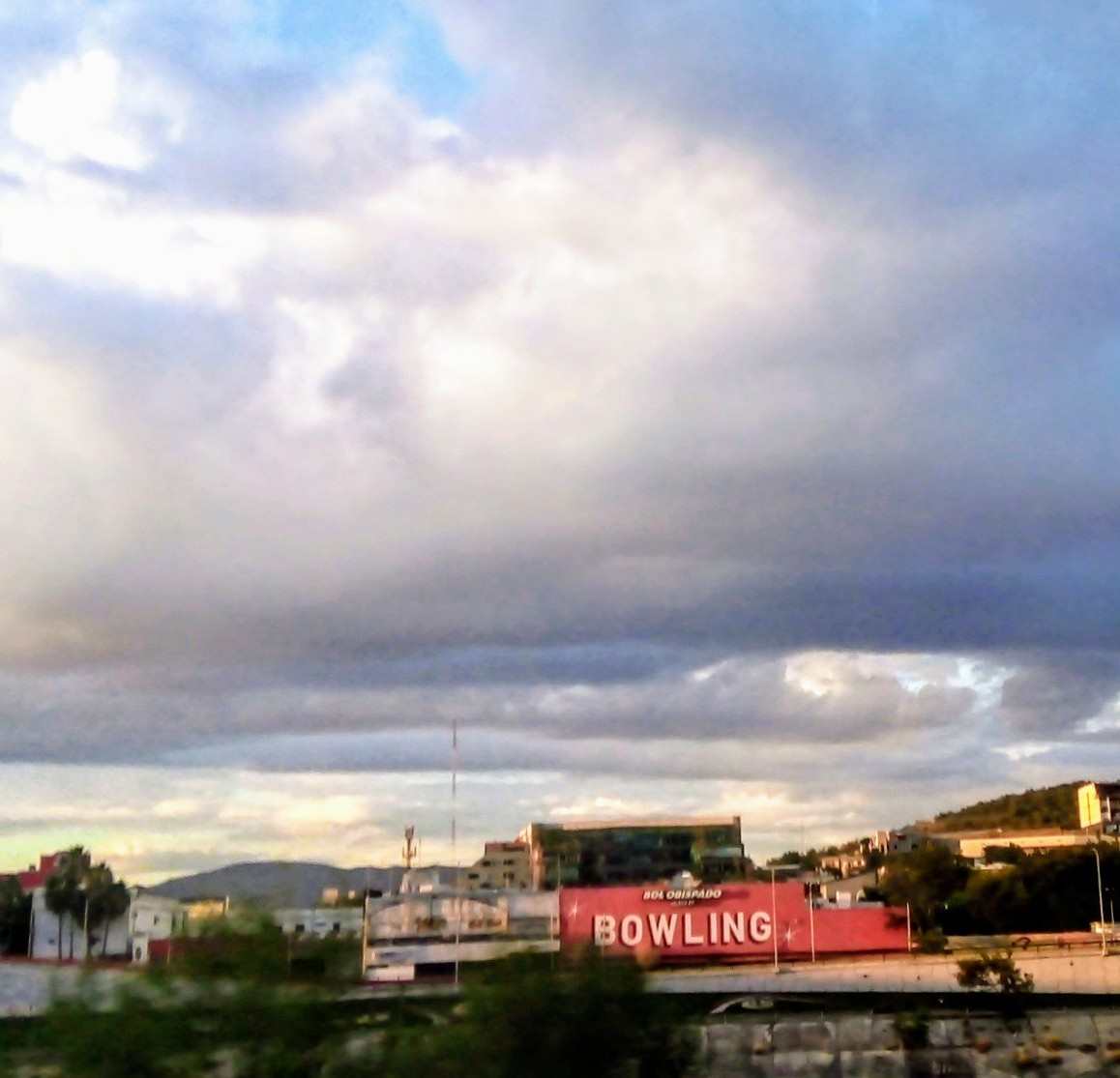
Stratocumulus radiatus

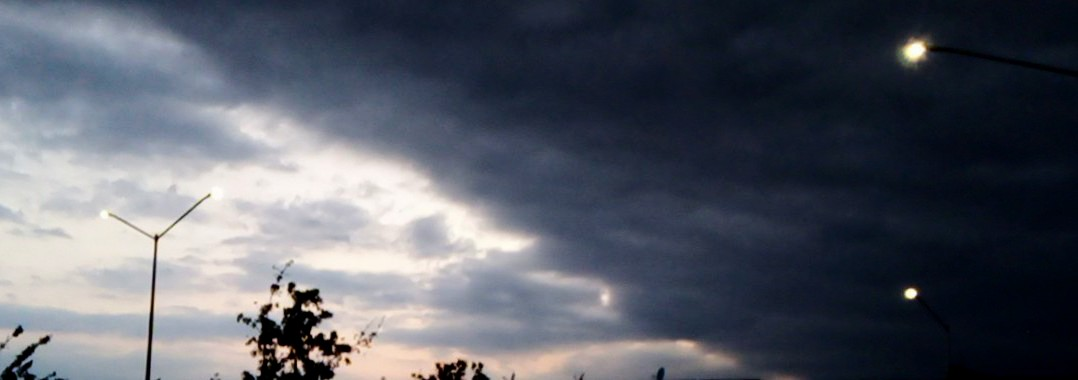
Stratocumulus duplicatus; Stratocumulus stratiformis (right) and Stratocumulus floccus (left)

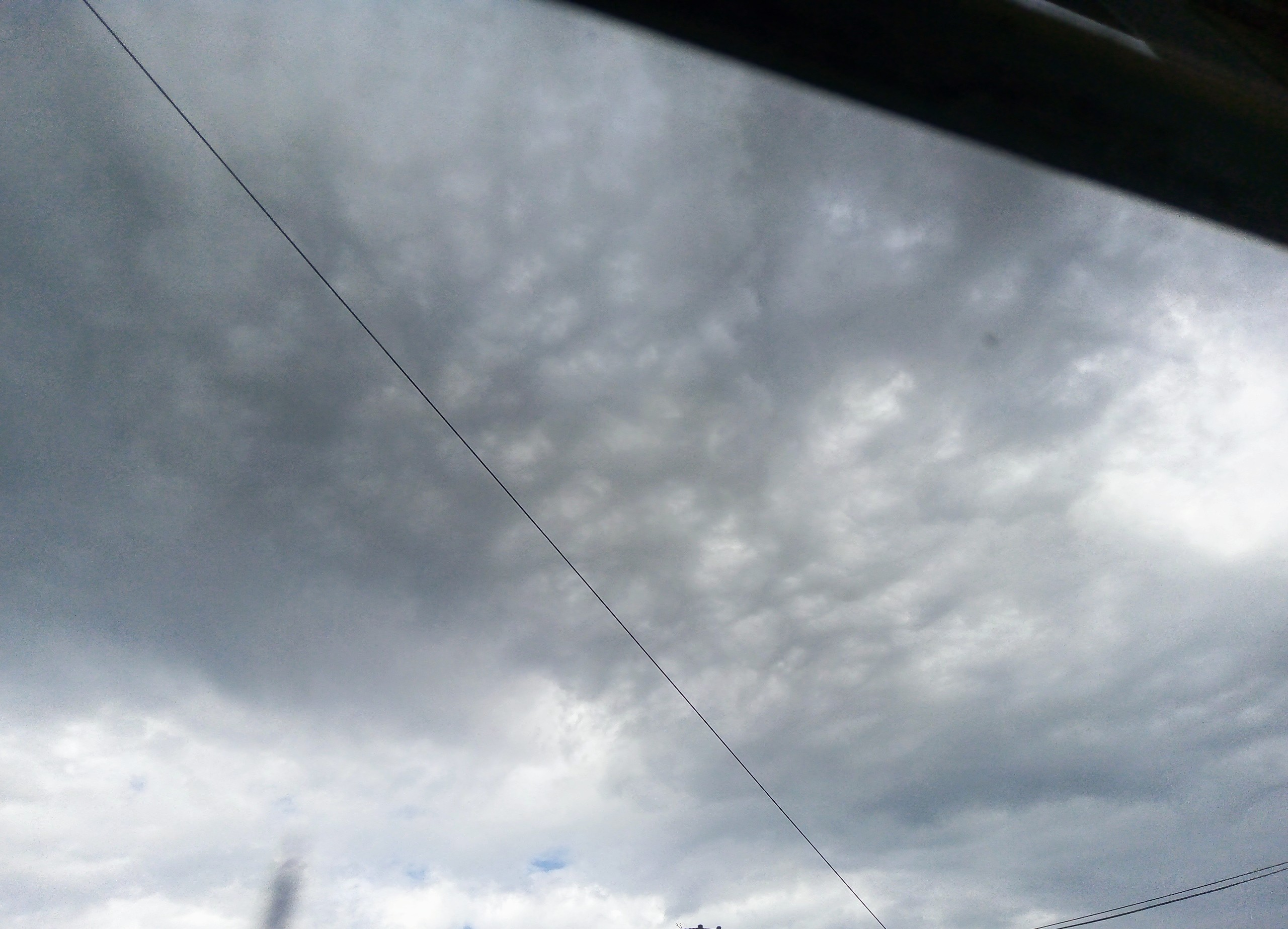
Stratocumulus lacunosus

== Supplementary feature ==
Stratocumulus Mamma is a type of mammatus cloud.

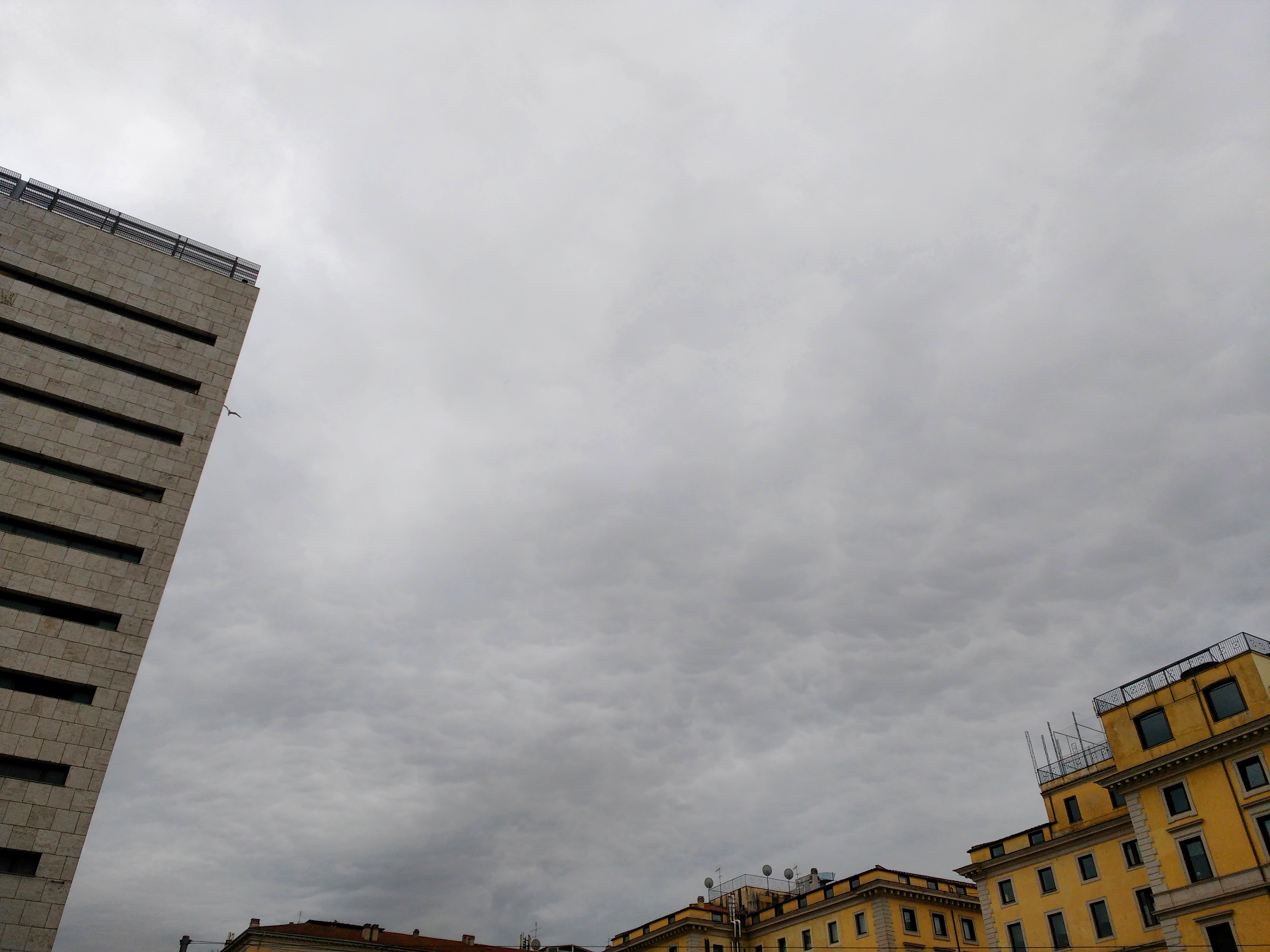
Stratocumulus mamma

Stratocumulus Asperitas is a rare, newly recognized supplementary feature that presents itself as chaotic, wavy undulations appearing in the base of a stratocumulus cloud cover. It is thought these clouds are formed by severe wind shear.

Stratocumulus Fluctus is also a rare, newly recognized supplementary feature in which short-lived "sea waves" form on top of a stratocumulus cloud, they are caused by wind speed and direction differences directly under and over the cloud.

== Precipitation-based supplementary features ==
Stratocumulus Virga is a form of precipitation that evaporates in mid-air and doesn't reach the ground.

Stratocumulus Praecipitatio is a form of precipitation that reaches the ground as light rain or snow.

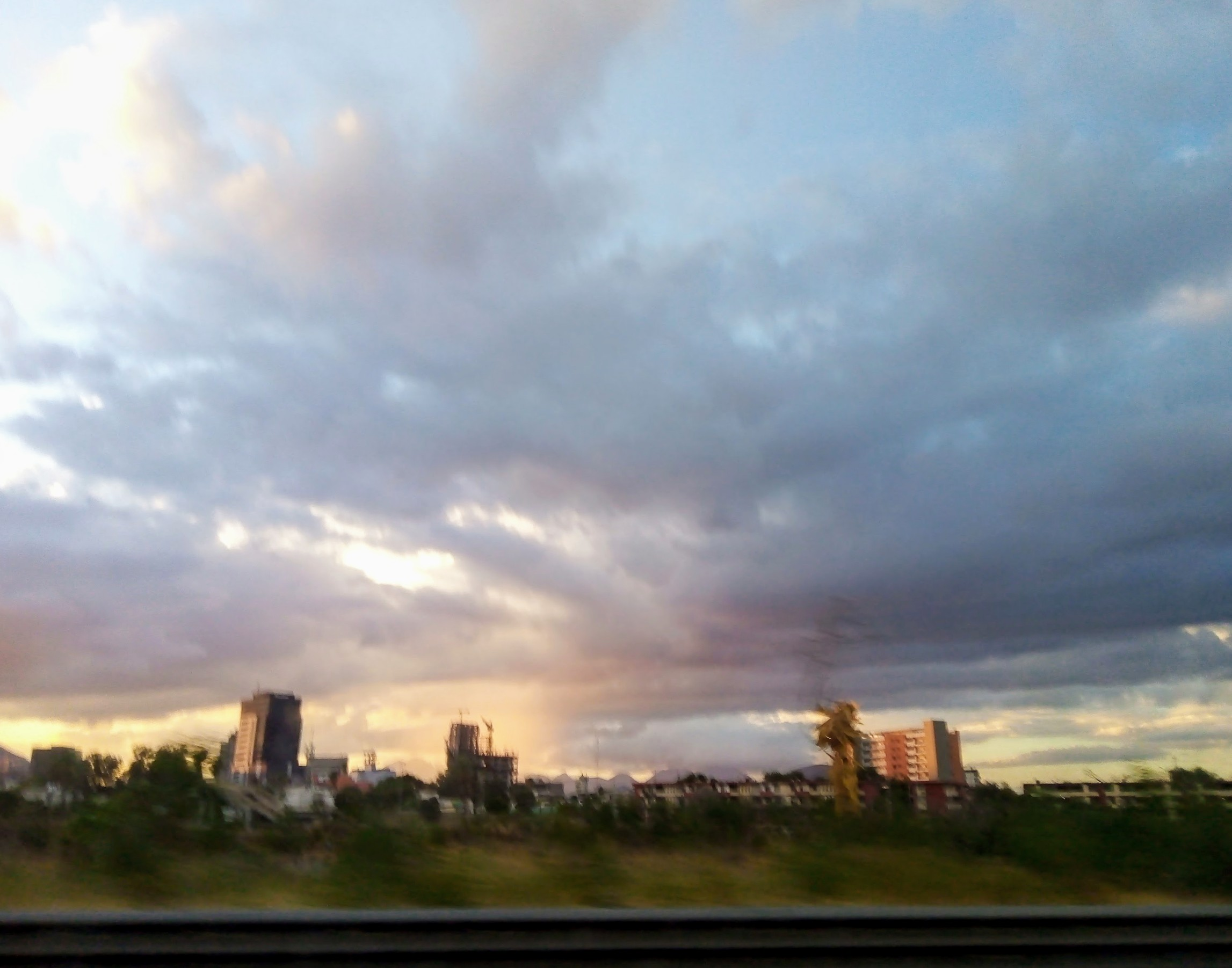
Stratocumulus stratiformis opacus radiatus praecipitatio

== Mother clouds ==
Stratocumulus Cumulomutatus the specific type of stratocumulus clouds, are flat and elongated. They form in the evening, when updrafts caused by convection decrease making cumulus clouds lose vertical development and spread horizontally. They also can occur under altostratus cloud preceding a warm or occluded front, when cumulus usually lose vertical development as the sun's heat decreases. Like all other forms of stratocumulus apart from castellanus, they are also often found in anticyclones.

Stratocumulus Cumulogenitus out of cumulus or cumulonimbus clouds, disrupted by decreasing convection. During formation period, puffy tops of cumulus clouds can protrude from stratocumulus cumulogenitus for a relatively long time until they completely spread in horizontal direction. Stratocumulus cumulogenitus appear as lengthy sheet or as group of separate elongated cloud rolls or waves.

== Hypothetical break-up ==
In 2019, a study employed a large eddy simulation model to estimate that equatorial stratocumulus clouds could break up and scatter when CO_{2} levels rise above 1,200 ppm (almost three times higher than the current levels, and over 4 times greater than the preindustrial levels). The study estimated that this would cause a surface warming of about 8 °C (14 °F) globally and 10 °C (18 °F) in the subtropics, which would be in addition to at least 4 °C (7.2 °F) already caused by such CO_{2} concentrations. Stratocumulus clouds would not reform until the CO_{2} concentrations drop to a much lower level.

It was suggested that this finding could help explain past episodes of unusually rapid warming such as Paleocene-Eocene Thermal Maximum. In 2020, further work from the same authors revealed that in their large eddy simulation, this tipping point cannot be stopped with solar radiation modification: in a hypothetical scenario where very high CO_{2} emissions continue for a long time but are offset with extensive solar radiation modification, the break-up of stratocumulus clouds is simply delayed until CO_{2} concentrations hit 1,700 ppm, at which point it would still cause around 5 °C (9.0 °F) of unavoidable warming.

However, because large eddy simulation models are simpler and smaller-scale than the general circulation models used for climate projections, with limited representation of atmospheric processes like subsidence, this finding is currently considered speculative. Other scientists say that the model used in that study unrealistically extrapolates the behavior of small cloud areas onto all cloud decks, and that it is incapable of simulating anything other than a rapid transition, with some comparing it to "a knob with two settings". Additionally, CO_{2} concentrations would only reach 1,200 ppm if the world follows Representative Concentration Pathway 8.5, which represents the highest possible greenhouse gas emission scenario and involves a massive expansion of coal infrastructure. In that case, 1,200 ppm would be passed shortly after 2100.

== See also ==
- Actinoform cloud

== Sources ==
=== Bibliography ===
- International Cloud Atlas (Report). Vol. I. Geneva, Switzerland: World Meteorological Organization. 1975. ISBN 92-63-10407-7. 407.
- Cohn, Stephen; Bruhn, Michael; Anderson, George; Atkinson, Roger; Campos, Marinés; Galati, Federico; Lovell, Ernest; Rae, Colleen; Rüedi, Isabelle; Tam, Kwong Hung; Thürig-Jenzer, Eliane; Trice, Jim (2017). International Cloud Atlas. World Meteorological Organization.
