= Warm front =

Boundary of advancing mass of warm air

Illustration of a warm front. The warm air behind the front is slowly overtaking the cold air ahead of the front, which is moving more slowly in the same direction. The warmer air, due to lower density, rises over the colder air as it moves. As a result of its increased altitude, it cools off and its moisture condenses, forming clouds and possibly precipitation.

Symbol commonly used to represent a warm front: a red line with semicircles pointing in the direction of travel.

A warm front is a density discontinuity located at the leading edge of a homogeneous warm air mass, and is typically located on the equator-facing edge of an isotherm gradient. Warm fronts lie within broader troughs of low pressure than cold fronts, and move more slowly than the cold fronts which usually follow because cold air is denser and less easy to remove from the Earth's surface. This also forces temperature differences across warm fronts to be broader in scale. Clouds ahead of the warm front are mostly stratiform, and rainfall generally increases as the front approaches. Fog can also occur preceding a warm frontal passage. Clearing and warming is usually rapid after frontal passage. If the warm air mass is unstable, thunderstorms may be embedded among the stratiform clouds ahead of the front, and after frontal passage thundershowers may continue. On weather maps, the surface location of a warm front is marked with a red line of semicircles pointing in the direction of travel.

== Development ==
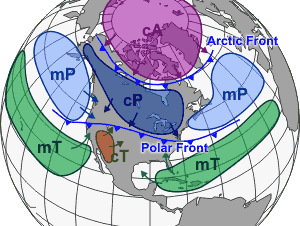
Different air masses that affect North America, as well as other continents, tend to be separated by frontal boundaries.

Air masses are large bodies of air with similar properties of temperature and humidity that form over source regions. The warm air mass behind a warm front is not only warmer, but often (but not always) also higher in humidity than the colder air preceding it. Because of a warm air mass’s higher temperature and thus lesser density, mixing between the two air masses is unlikely. Being light, the warm air mass is unable to displace the cooler air mass and instead is forced upward along the upper boundary of the colder air in a process known as overrunning. The boundary between the two air masses has a gradual slope of 1:200 and lifting is slow but persistent.

As the air mass rises into regions of lower pressure, it expands and cools. As it cools, any water vapor that is present will condense and form extensive cloud cover. The first clouds that indicate an approaching warm front tend to be mostly high cirrus at first, changing to cirrostratus as the front approaches. However, if cirrocumulus also appears, there is greater air mass instability approaching ahead of the front. When these high clouds progressively invade the sky and the barometric pressure begins to fall, precipitation associated with the disturbance is likely about 6 to 8 hours away. A thickening and lowering of these high clouds into middle-stage altostratus or altocumulus is a good sign the warm front or low has moved closer and precipitation may begin within less than six hours. Once the clouds have thickened to 2,500 metres (8,200 ft) from the earth’s surface, precipitation can begin to fall from heavy nimbostratus. If unstable altocumulus castellanus accompanies or takes the place of the main altostratus layer, cumulus congestus or cumulonimbus producing showers or thunderstorms may follow. Low stratus and stratocumulus commonly form underneath the main precipitating clouds.

A warm front is also defined as the transition zone where a warmer air mass is replacing a cooler air mass. Warm fronts generally move from southwest to northeast. If the warmer air originates over the ocean, it is not only warmer but also more moist than the air ahead of it.

== Characteristics ==
If the air mass is relatively stable, rainfall will increase until the front reaches the location, at which time the clouds can extend all the way to the Earth’s surface as fog. Once the front passes, the location experiences some warming and clearing. If the air mass is unstable, thunderstorms may precede and follow the front and temperature changes will be larger.

In the Northern Hemisphere, a warm front causes a shift of wind blowing from southeast to southwest, and in the Southern Hemisphere a shift from winds blowing from northeast to northwest. Common characteristics associated with warm fronts include:

Weather phenomenon	Prior to the passing of the front	While the front is passing	After the passing of the front
Temperature	Cool	Warming suddenly	Warmer, then leveling off
Atmospheric pressure	Decreasing steadily	Leveling off	Slight rise followed by a decrease
Winds	South to southeast (backing) (northern hemisphere); North to northeast (veering) (southern hemisphere)	Variable	South to southwest (veering) (northern hemisphere); North to northwest (backing) (southern hemisphere)
Precipitation	Usually none, but in summer or warm temperatures, cumulus congestus may continue to exist under cirrostratus and altostratus creating light to moderate showers.	Persistent rain, usually moderate with some lighter periods and some heavier bursts. In winter, snow may turn to rain after passing through ice pellets and freezing rain.	Light drizzle, gradually ceasing.
Clouds	Cirrus, cirrostratus, altostratus, nimbostratus, then stratus. Other clouds can also often be seen, including cirrocumulus amongst the approaching cirrus, altocumulus with or instead of altostratus (particularly if the front is weak), and occasionally cumulonimbus along with or instead of nimbostratus in summer. Additionally, stratocumulus often appears underneath the main altostratus deck and stratus fractus typically forms in precipitation falling from the thick nimbostratus layer. Often in warm temperatures, rain bearing cumulus congestus clouds can appear under the cirrostratus, and more rarely altocumulus castellanus clouds if convection is sufficient. In cold humid conditions, low air mass stratus or fog may obscure the main frontal clouds.	Nimbostratus, sometimes cumulonimbus	Clearing with scattered stratus and stratocumulus. If the warm front is part of a depression, there is often a sheet of altostratus (often broken in places to altocumulus) above this which thickens when the cold front approaches.
Visibility	Poor	Poor, but improving	Sunny
Dew point	Steady rise	Steady	Rise, then steady

== Warm sector ==
The warm sector is a near-surface air mass in between the warm front and the cold front, on the equatorward side of an extratropical cyclone. With its warm and humid characteristics, this air is susceptive to convective instability and can sustain thunderstorms, especially if lifted by the advancing cold front.

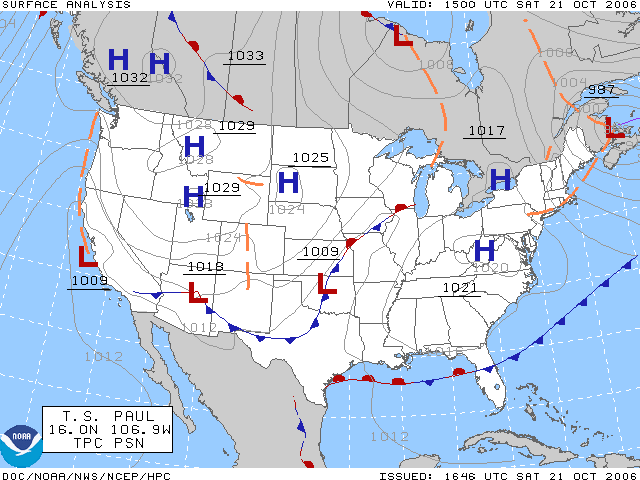
A surface weather analysis for the United States on October 21, 2006. Note the warm front in the northwest Gulf of Mexico.

== Depiction ==
On weather maps, the surface location of a warm front is marked with a red line of half circles pointing in the direction of the front. On colored weather maps, warm fronts are illustrated with a solid red line.

== See also ==
- Cold front
- Occluded front
- Pseudo-warm front
- Weather front
