= Stratus nebulosus =

Cloud species

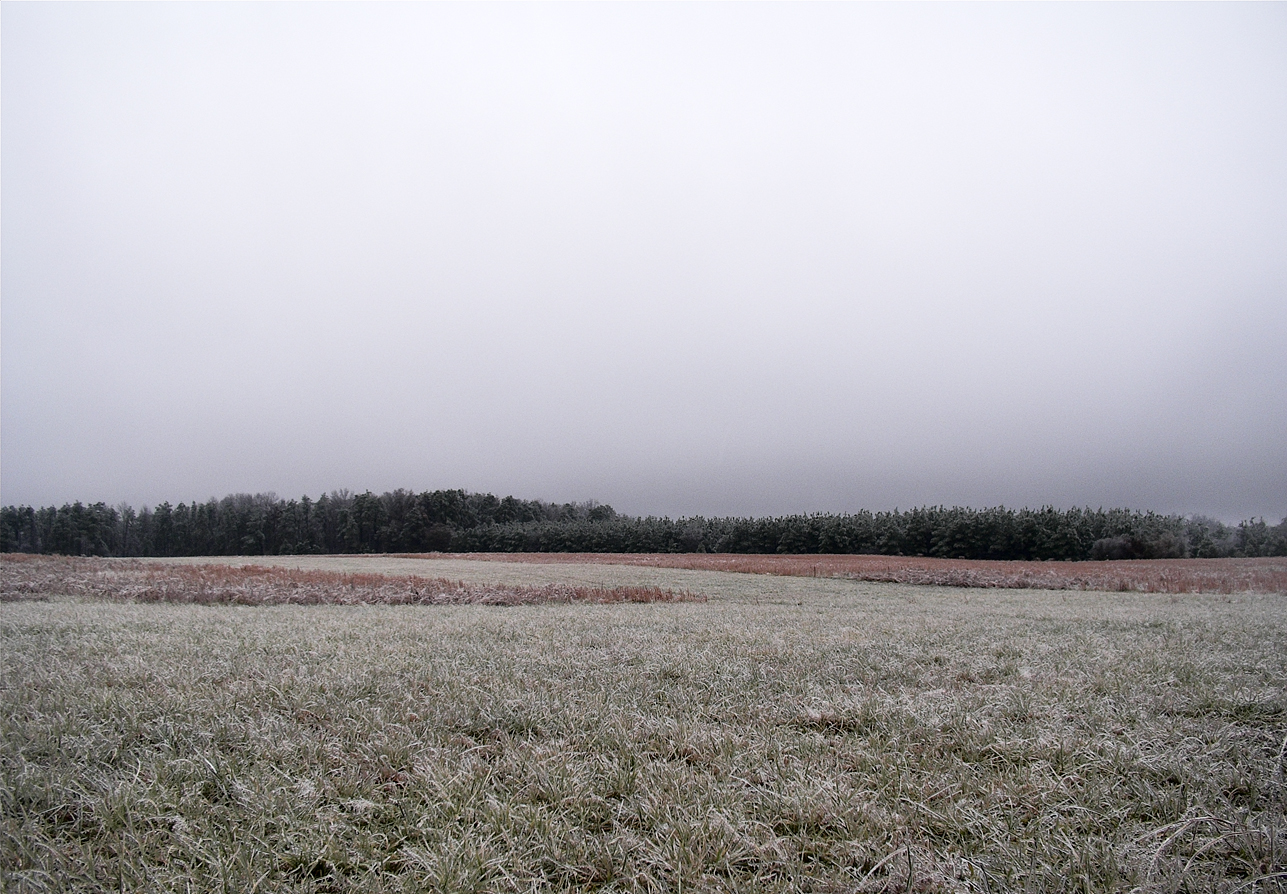
- Stratus nebulosus
- Abbreviation: St neb
- Genus: Stratus (layered)
- Species: Nebulosus
- Variety: Opacus; Translucidus; Undulatus
- Altitude: 0–2000 m (0–7,000 ft)
- Classification: Family C (Low-level)
- Appearance: Full of vapor, lacking detail, gray, featureless low-altitude cloud capable of ground contact.
- Precipitation: Uncommon; drizzle, freezing drizzle, Snow, snow grains

Stratus nebulosus is a species of low-level stratus cloud. It is one of two species of stratus clouds, the other being fractus. Translated from Latin meaning nebulous, their cloud abbreviations can be respectively written as ‘St neb’. For a cloud to be classified as nebulosus, there has to be zero sign of detail in the cloud.

Low-level fog is an example of stratus nebulosus. Its usual appearance is a sheet of gray sitting above the ground. Very dense fog can be classified as stratus nebulosus opacus, which translates to a stratus cloud that has no detail and is dark enough to block out sunlight. Stratus nebulosus clouds are commonly paired with cloud varieties opacus (opaque) and translucidus (see-through) and can produce precipitation (praecipitatio) on occasion.

The nebulosus cloud species is common, and more commonly found in stratus cloud formations relative to cirrostratus clouds.

== See also ==
- List of cloud types
