= Precipitation types =

Characters, formations, and phases of water condensed in the atmosphere

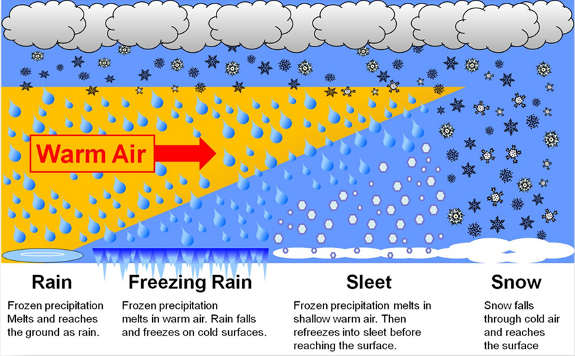
Typical precipitation types associated with a warm front advancing over frigid air

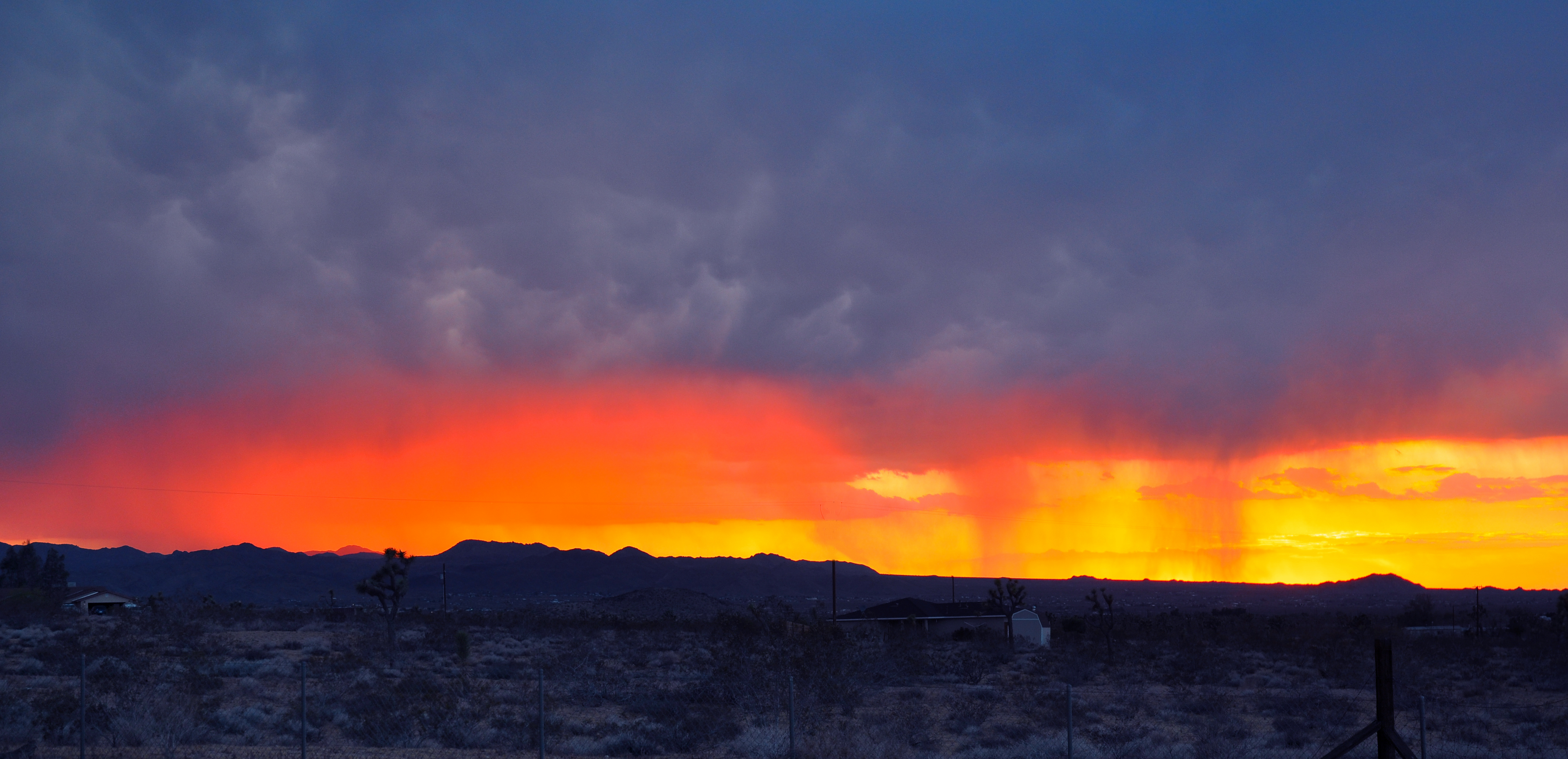
Precipitation in the form of a sunshower

In meteorology, the different types of precipitation often include the character, formation, or phase of the precipitation which is falling to ground level. There are three distinct ways that precipitation can occur. Convective precipitation is generally more intense, and of shorter duration, than stratiform precipitation. Orographic precipitation occurs when moist air is forced upwards over rising terrain and condenses on the slope, such as a mountain.

Precipitation can fall in either liquid or solid phases, is mixed with both, or transition between them at the freezing level. Liquid forms of precipitation include rain and drizzle and dew. Rain or drizzle which freezes on contact with a surface within a subfreezing air mass gains the preceding adjective "freezing", becoming the known freezing rain or freezing drizzle. Slush is a mixture of both liquid and solid precipitation. Frozen forms of precipitation include snow, ice crystals, ice pellets (sleet), hail, and graupel. Their respective intensities are classified either by rate of precipitation, or by visibility restriction.

== Phases ==
Precipitation falls in many forms, or phases. They can be subdivided into:

- Liquid precipitation:
  - Drizzle (DZ)
  - Rain (RA)
  - Cloudburst (CB)
- Freezing/Mixed precipitation:
  - Freezing drizzle (FZDZ)
  - Freezing rain (FZRA)
  - Rain and snow mixed / Slush (RASN)
  - Drizzle and snow mixed / Slush (DZSN)
- Frozen precipitation:
  - Snow (SN)
  - Snow grains (SG)
  - Ice crystals (IC)
  - Ice pellets / Sleet (PL)
  - Snow pellets / Graupel (GS)
  - Hail (GR)
  - Megacryometeors (MC)

The parenthesized letters are the shortened METAR codes for each phenomenon.

== Mechanisms ==
Precipitation occurs when evapotranspiration takes place and local air becomes saturated with water vapor, and so can no longer maintain the level of water vapor in gaseous form, which creates clouds. This occurs when less dense moist air cools, usually when an air mass rises through the atmosphere to higher and cooler altitudes. However, an air mass can also cool without a change in altitude (e.g. through radiative cooling, or ground contact with cold terrain).

Convective precipitation occurs when air rises vertically through the (temporarily) self-sustaining mechanism of convection. Stratiform precipitation occurs when large air masses rise diagonally as larger-scale winds and atmospheric dynamics force them to move over each other. Orographic precipitation is similar, except the upwards motion is forced when a moving air mass encounters the rising slope of a landform such as a mountain ridge or slope.

=== Convectional ===
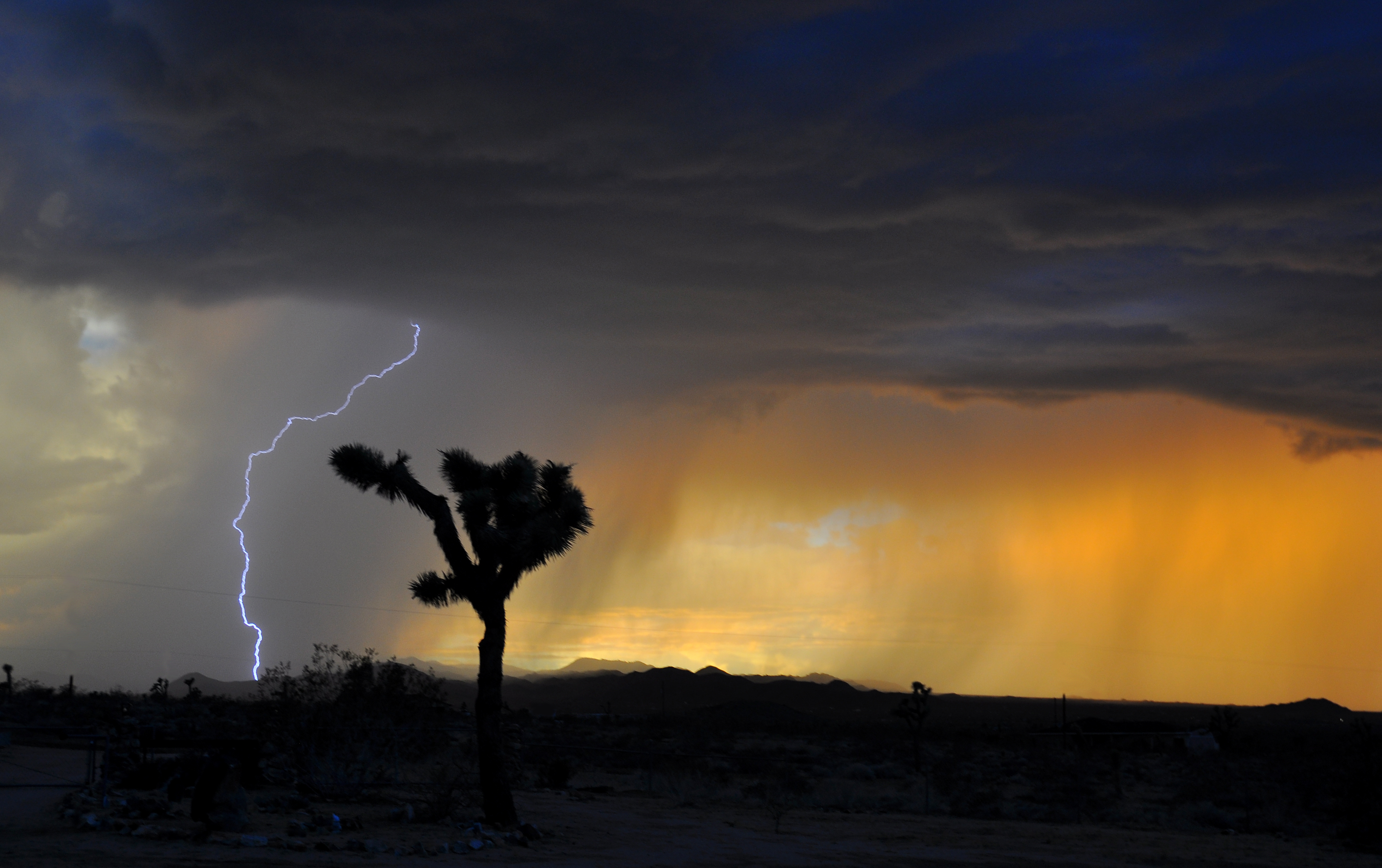
A violent electrical storm results from convective cumulonimbus clouds.

Convection occurs when the Earth's surface, especially within a conditionally unstable or moist atmosphere, becomes heated more than its surroundings and in turn leading to significant evapotranspiration. Convective rain and light precipitation are the result of large convective clouds, for example cumulonimbus or cumulus congestus clouds. In the initial stages of this precipitation, it generally falls as showers with a smaller area and a rapidly changing intensity. Convective precipitation falls over a certain area for a relatively short time, as convective clouds have limited vertical and horizontal extent and do not conserve much water. Most precipitation in the tropics appears to be convective; however, it has been suggested that stratiform and convective precipitation often both occur within the same complex of convection-generated cumulonimbus.

Graupel and hail indicate convection when either or both are present at the surface. They are indicative that some form of precipitation forms and exists at the freezing level, a varying point in the atmosphere in which the temperature is 0°C. In mid-latitude regions, convective precipitation is often associated with cold fronts where it is often found behind the front, occasionally initiating a squall line.

=== Cyclonic ===
A weather front is the boundary of two air masses with different characteristics

Frontal precipitation is the result of frontal systems surrounding extratropical cyclones or lows, which form when warm and tropical air meets cooler, subpolar air. Frontal precipitation typically falls out from nimbostratus clouds.

When masses of air with different densities (moisture and temperature characteristics) meet, the less dense warmer air overrides the more dense colder air. The warmer air is forced to rise and, if conditions are right, creates an effect of saturation and condensation, causing precipitation. In turn, precipitation can enhance the temperature and dewpoint contrast along a frontal boundary, creating more precipitation while the front lasts. Passing weather fronts often result in sudden changes in environmental temperature, and in turn the humidity and pressure in the air at ground level as different air masses switch the local weather.

Warm fronts occur where advancing warm air pushes out a previously extant cold air mass. The warm air overrides the cooler air and moves upward. Warm fronts are followed by extended periods of light rain and drizzle due to the fact that, after the warm air rises above the cooler air (which remains on the ground), it gradually cools due to the air's expansion while being lifted, which forms clouds and leads to precipitation.

Cold fronts occur when an advancing mass of cooler air dislodges and plows through a mass of warm air. This type of transition is sharper and faster than warm fronts, since cold air is more dense than warm air and sinks through in gravity's favor. Precipitation duration is often shorter and generally more intense than that which occurs ahead of warm fronts.

A wide variety of weather can be found along an occluded front, usually found near anticyclonic activity, but usually their passage is associated with a drying of the air mass.

=== Orographic ===
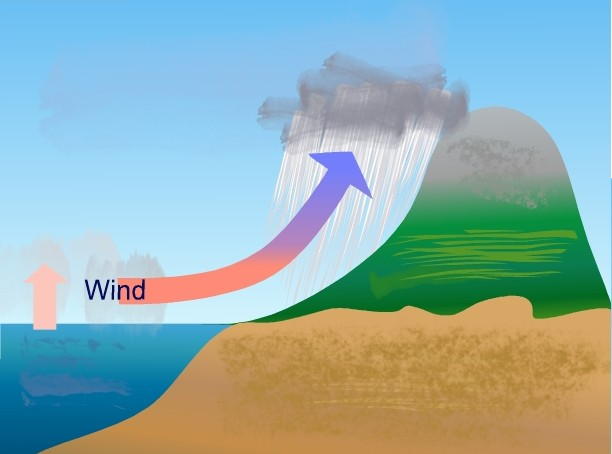
Orographic precipitation occurs when moist air is forced upwards by terrain.

Orographic or relief rainfall is caused when masses of air are forced up the side of elevated land formations, such as large mountains or plateaus (often referred to as an upslope effect). The lift of the air up the side of the mountain results in adiabatic cooling with altitude, and ultimately condensation and precipitation. In mountainous parts of the world subjected to relatively consistent winds (for example, the trade winds), a more moist climate usually prevails on the windward side of a mountain than on the leeward (downwind) side, as wind carries moist air masses and orographic precipitation. Moisture is precipitated and removed by orographic lift, leaving drier air (see Foehn) on the descending (generally warming), leeward side where a rain shadow is observed.

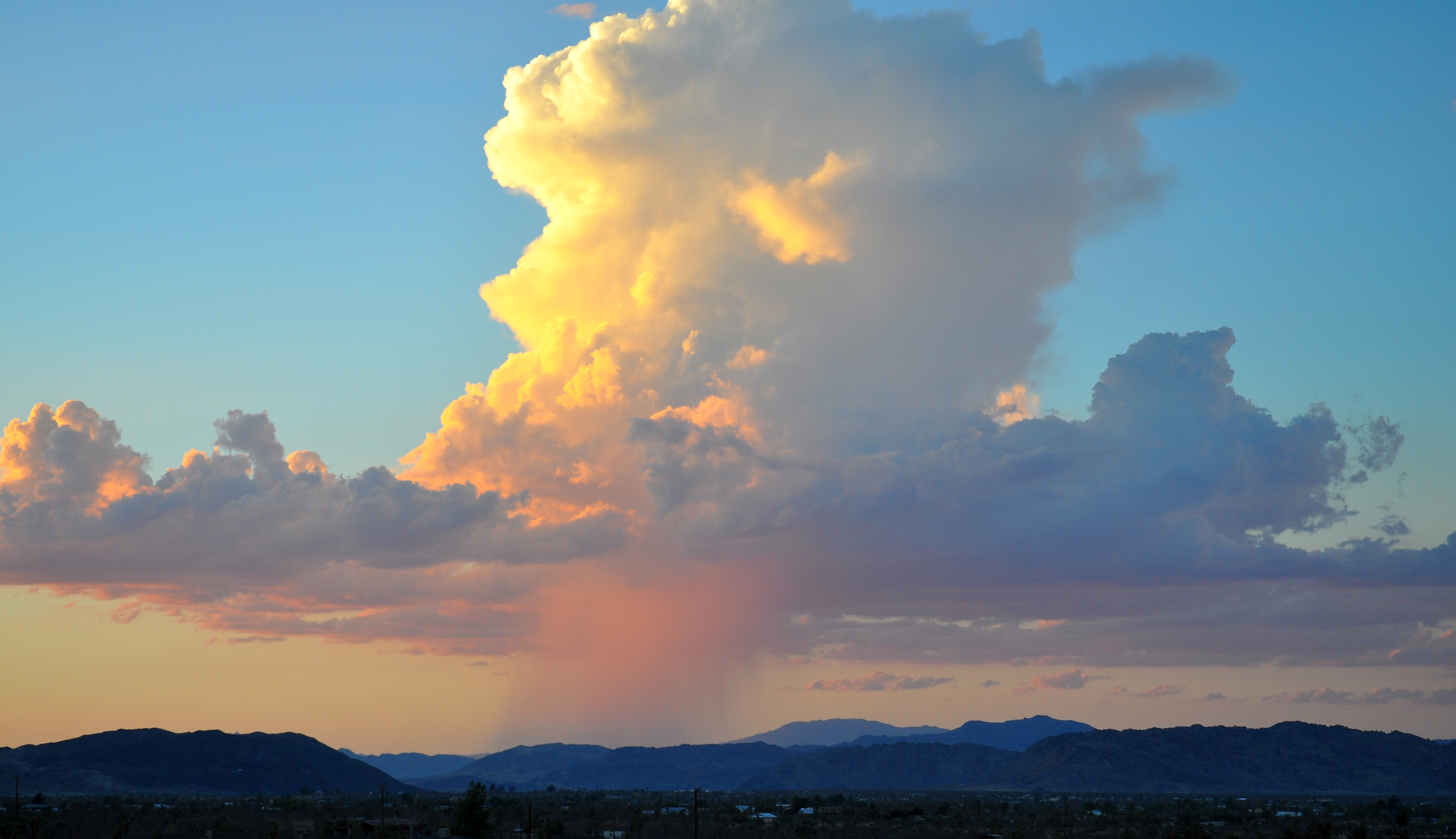
Post orographic lift isolated towering vertical thunderhead shower in Mojave Desert, western USA

In Hawaii, Mount Waiʻaleʻale (Waiʻaleʻale), on the island of Kauai, is notable for its extreme rainfall. It currently has the highest average annual rainfall on Earth, with approximately 460 inches (12,000 mm) per year. Storm systems affect the region with heavy rains during winter, between October and March. Local climates vary considerably on each island due to their topography, divisible into windward (Koʻolau) and leeward (Kona) regions based upon location relative to the higher surrounding mountains. Windward sides face the east-to-northeast trade winds and receive much more clouds and rainfall; leeward sides are drier and sunnier, with less rain and less cloud cover. On the island of Oahu, high amounts of clouds and often rain can usually be observed around the windward mountain peaks, while the southern parts of the island (including most of Honolulu and Waikiki) receive dramatically less rainfall throughout the year.

In South America, the Andes mountain range blocks Pacific Ocean winds and moisture that arrives on the continent, resulting in a desert-like climate just downwind across western Argentina. The Sierra Nevada range creates the same drying effect in North America, causing the Great Basin Desert, Mojave Desert, and Sonoran Desert.

== Intensity ==
Precipitation is measured using a rain gauge, and more recently remote sensing techniques such as a weather radar. When classified according to the rate of precipitation, rain can be divided into categories. Light rain describes rainfall which falls at a rate of between a trace and 2.5 millimetres (0.098 in) per hour. Moderate rain describes rainfall with a precipitation rate of between 2.6 millimetres (0.10 in) and 7.6 millimetres (0.30 in) per hour. Heavy rain describes rainfall with a precipitation rate above 7.6 millimetres (0.30 in) per hour, and violent rain has a rate more than 50 millimetres (2.0 in) per hour.

Snowfall intensity is classified in terms of visibility instead. When the visibility is over 1 kilometre (0.62 mi), snow is determined to be light. Moderate snow describes snowfall with visibility restrictions between 0.5 kilometres (0.31 mi) and 1 kilometre (0.62 mi). Heavy snowfall describes conditions when visibility is restricted below 0.5 kilometres (0.31 mi).

== Gallery ==
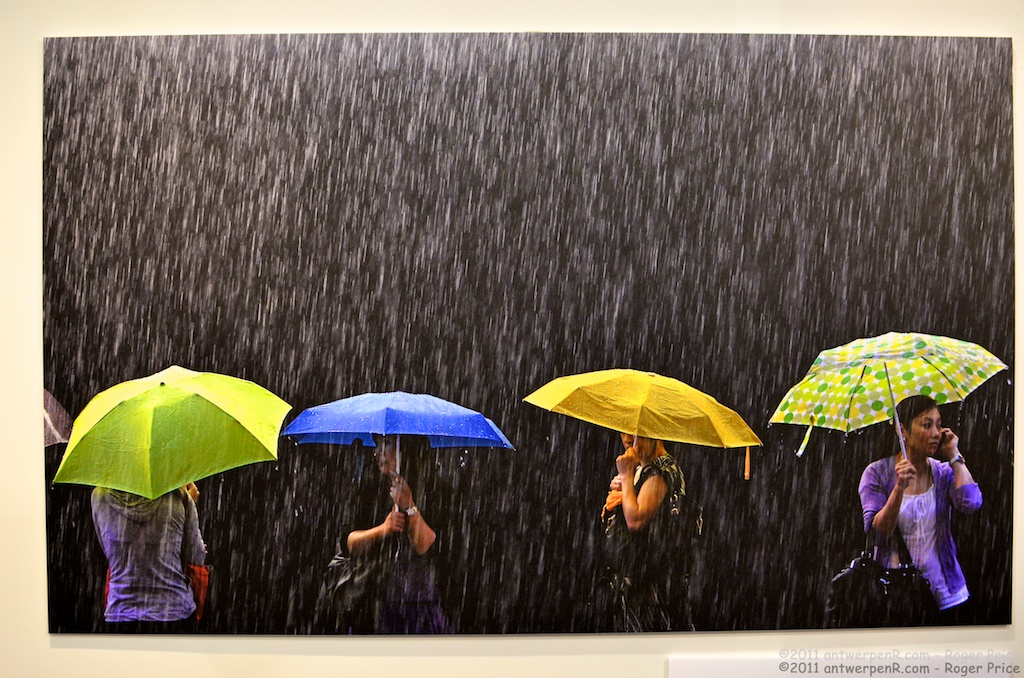
Tropical downpour in Hong Kong

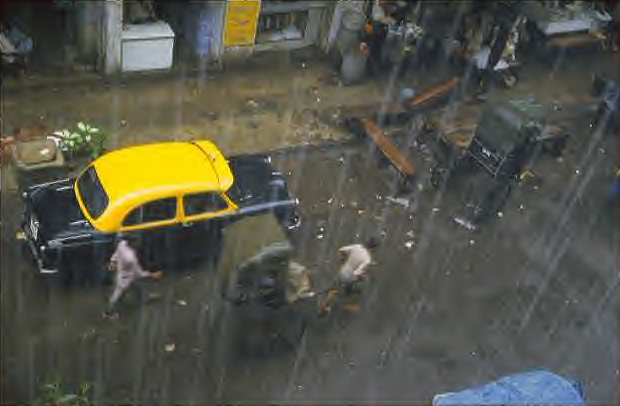
Heavy rain falling in Kolkata, India

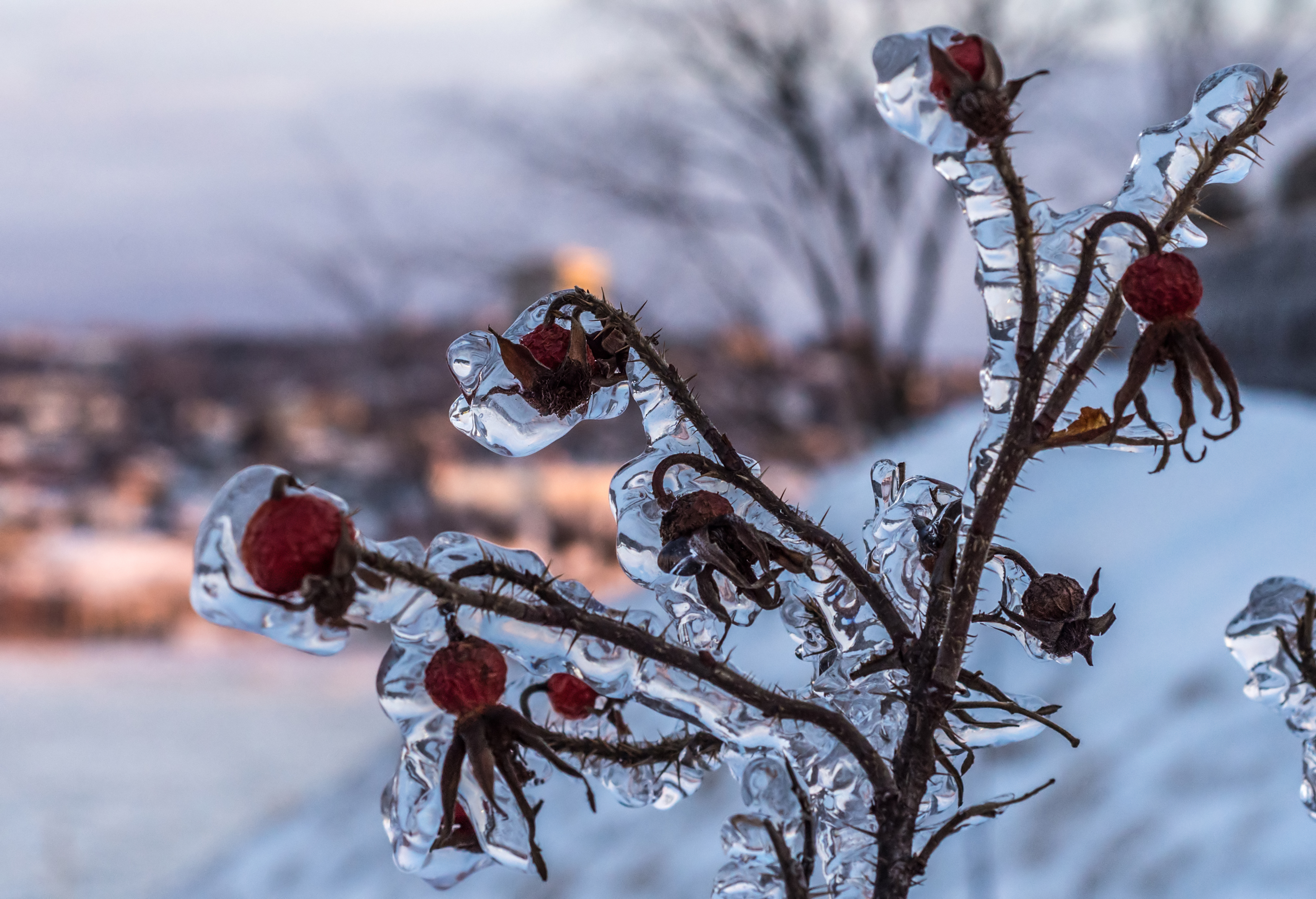
Freezing rain in Quebec City, Canada

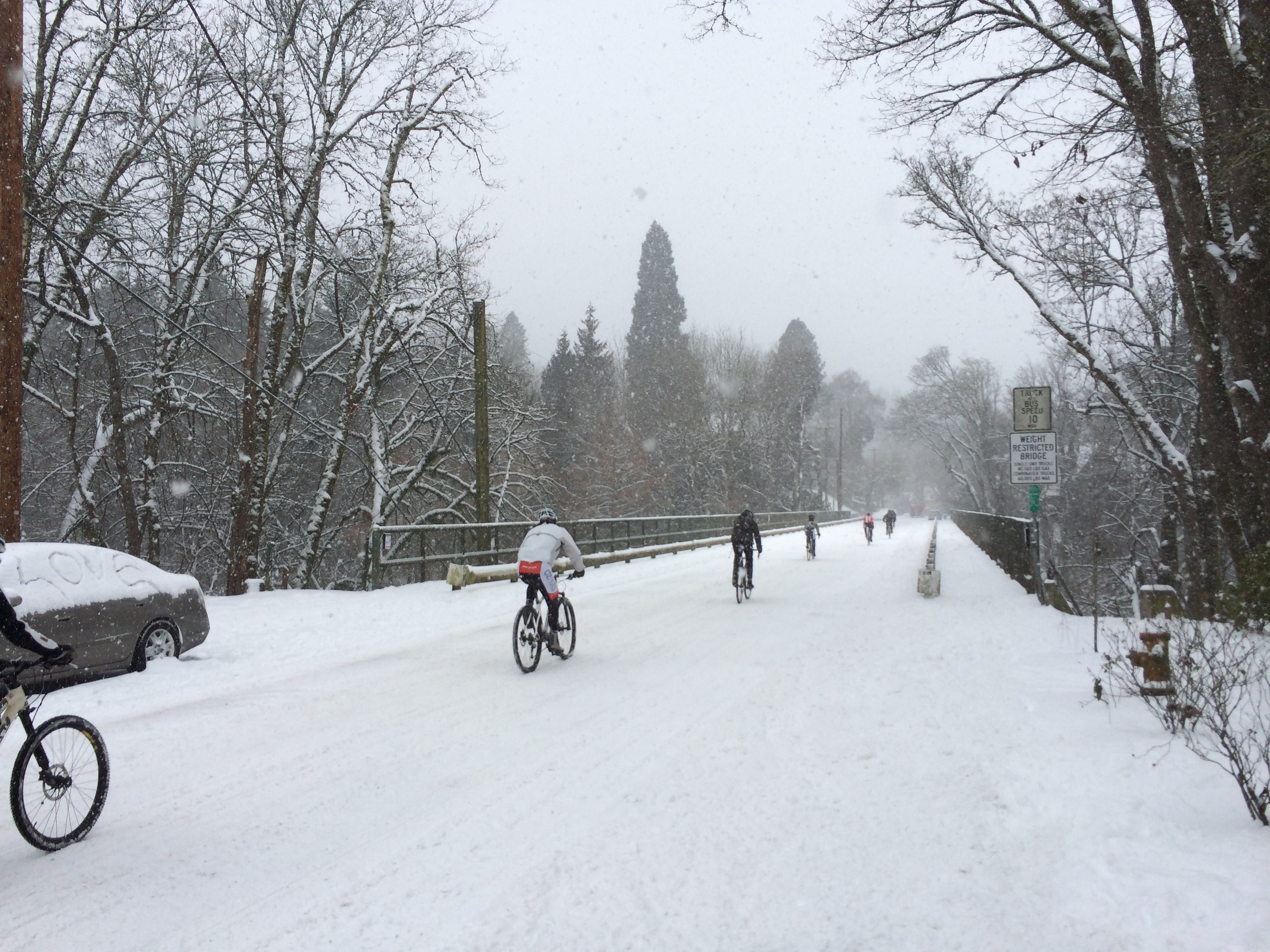
Light snow in Portland, Oregon, U.S.

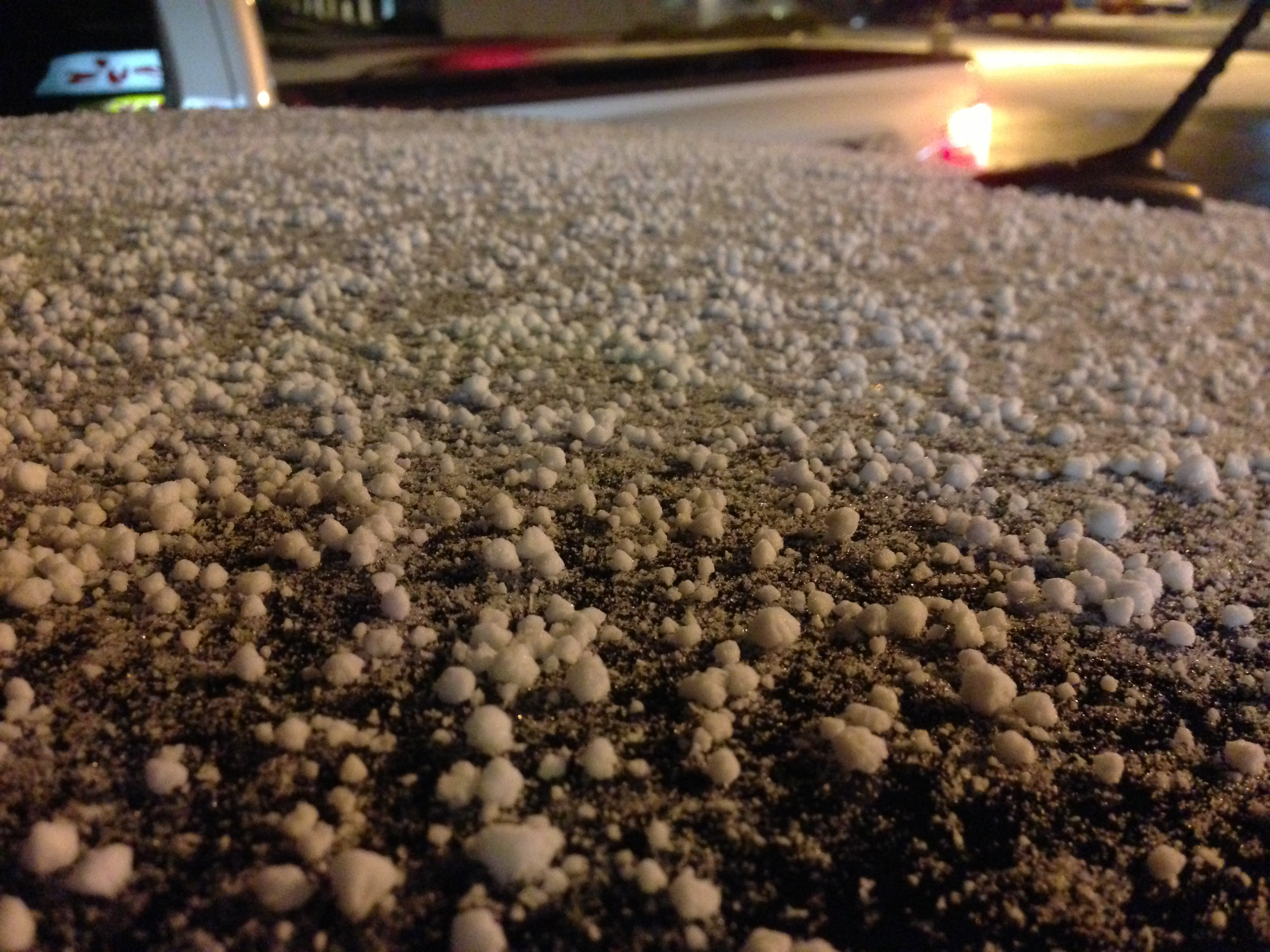
Graupel accumulation in Elko, Nevada, U.S.

== See also ==
- Weather
- Precipitation
- Flood
- Cyclone
- Low pressure area
