= Trace (precipitation) =

Amount of precipitation below the smallest measurable by rain or snow gauges

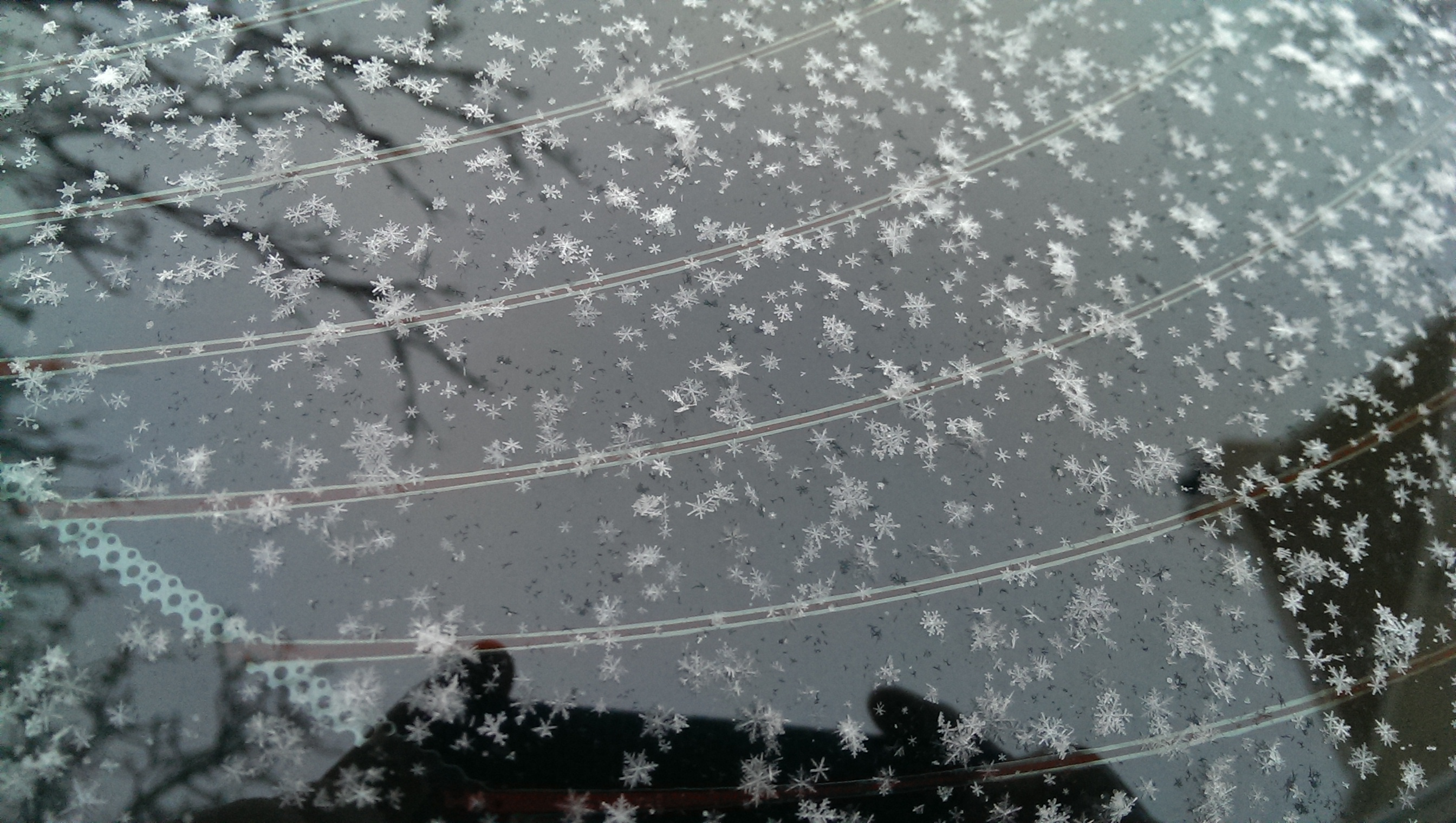
- A trace of snowfall

In meteorology, a trace denotes an amount of precipitation, such as rain or snow, that is greater than zero, but is too small to be measured by standard units or methods of measurement. The designation of a trace rather than zero is used to indicate that precipitation did fall, but not enough to be measured reliably. This is important for both weather forecasting and climatological purposes, because even precipitation amounts too small to be measured can have significant societal impacts.

== Definitions ==
The term "trace" is used in two different but related contexts. The first is in weather forecasting and record-keeping of rain, snow, and other precipitation, where a trace denotes an amount of precipitation that is greater than zero, but is too small to be measured by standard units or methods of measurement. This can be as little as just a few raindrops or snowflakes, or be enough to wet or coat the ground, but will not be enough to register via standard measurements with a rain gauge or other measuring device. The second is in the context of snowpack depth, or the amount of snow on the ground at a given time. If less than a measurable amount is present on the ground, or if less than half of the ground is covered with snow (regardless of that snow's depth), this can be denoted by a trace.

A trace is usually indicated by a capital letter "T" or the word "trace" in place of a numerical amount of accumulation. A trace measurement is not usually considered equivalent to any numerical value, and so adding together several trace amounts (for example, when computing monthly totals) will still be considered equal to a trace in most cases.

For frozen precipitation, a trace can indicate a very light accumulation, or it can indicate a larger amount of snowfall, ice pellets (called "sleet" in the United States), or other frozen precipitation that is continuously melting as it hits the ground. A trace of snow is sometimes referred to as a "dusting".

== Significance ==
Meteorologists and other atmospheric scientists distinguish between a trace and zero accumulation in forecasts and climatological records for several reasons. First, for accumulation of freezing rain and other icy precipitation, even a trace amount can result in hazardous conditions such as slippery roads. Secondly, some areas (primarily in Arctic regions) receive a significant amount of snowfall in "trace" amounts: some areas of northern Canada receive up to 80% of their snowfall in trace amounts. This can lead to unrealistic totals over time compared to the actual amount of snow that has fallen. To address this issue, trace snowfall is sometimes treated as equivalent to small numerical amounts (such as 0.03 millimetres (0.001 in) or 0.07 millimetres (0.003 in)) for certain climatological purposes.

== Regional differences ==
In areas where imperial units are used (primarily the United States), liquid precipitation (rain and drizzle) is measured in intervals of 0.01 inches (0.25 mm), while snow, ice pellets, and most other precipitation types are measured in intervals of 0.1 inches (2.5 mm). Freezing rain is sometimes measured in intervals of 0.1 inches (2.5 mm) and other times intervals of 0.01 inches (0.25 mm), depending on the measuring device. In areas where metric units are used, rain is measured in intervals of 0.1 millimetres (0.004 in), while other precipitation is typically measured in intervals of 0.1 centimetres (0.04 in). Anything less than these amounts is generally referred to as a trace.

== See also ==
- Freezing fog
- Snow flurry
