= Opacus (cloud variety) =

Opaque cloud variety

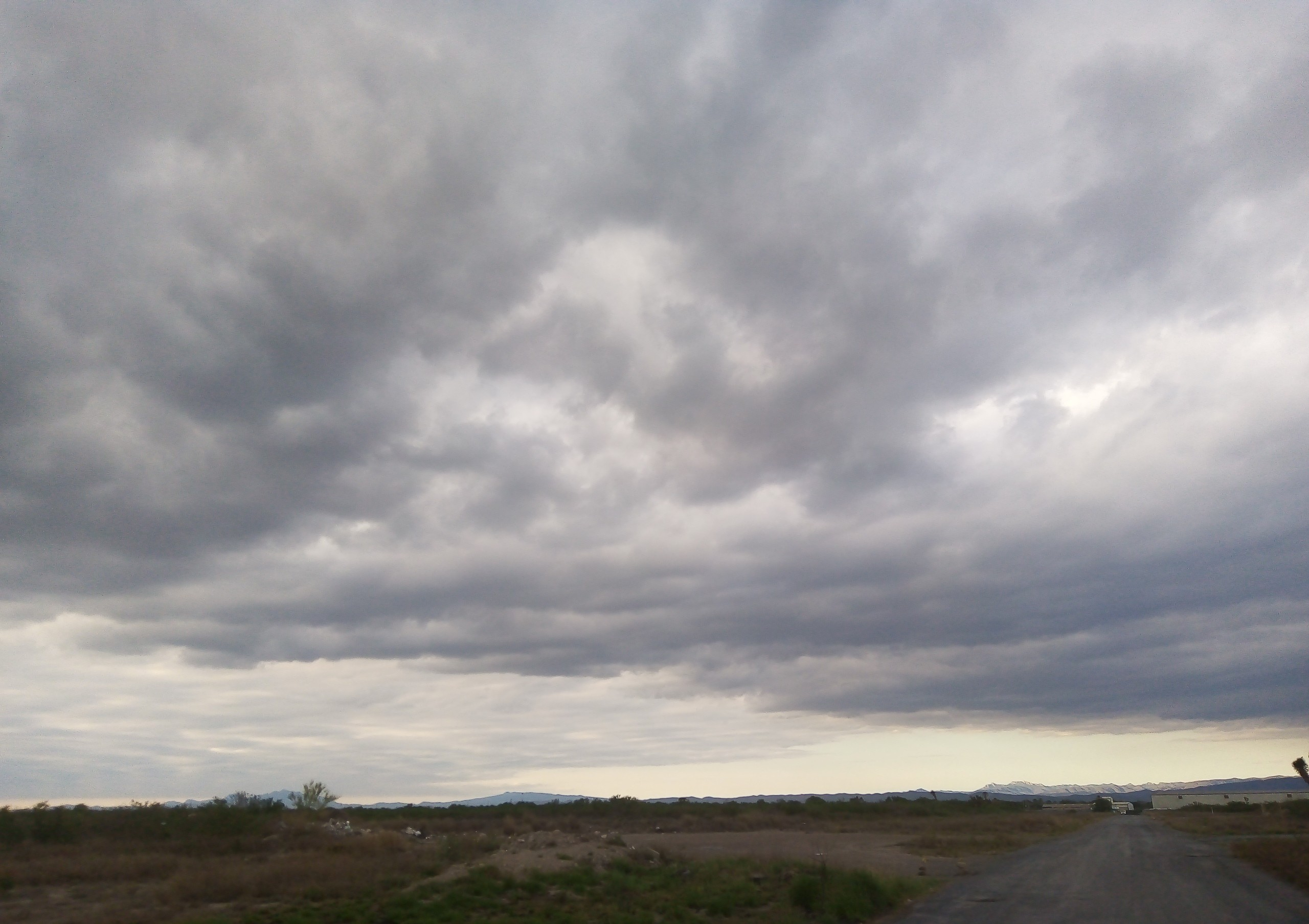
- Stratocumulus stratiformis opacus undulatus
- Abbreviation: op
- Genus: Altostratus, altocumulus, stratocumulus, stratus
- Variety: opacus
- Appearance: Opaque cloud cover that hides the location of the Sun or Moon
- Precipitation: Depends on the cloud type this variety is appearing in

Opacus is a cloud variety that is found in stratocumulus, altocumulus, altostratus, and stratus cloud types. This cloud variety has a dark and opaque appearance and hides the location of the Sun and Moon. This makes it the opposite of translucidus, which is translucent and gives away the location of the Sun and Moon.

== See also ==
- Translucidus (cloud variety)
- Perlucidus (cloud variety)
