= Perlucidus (cloud variety) =

Variety of cumulus clouds

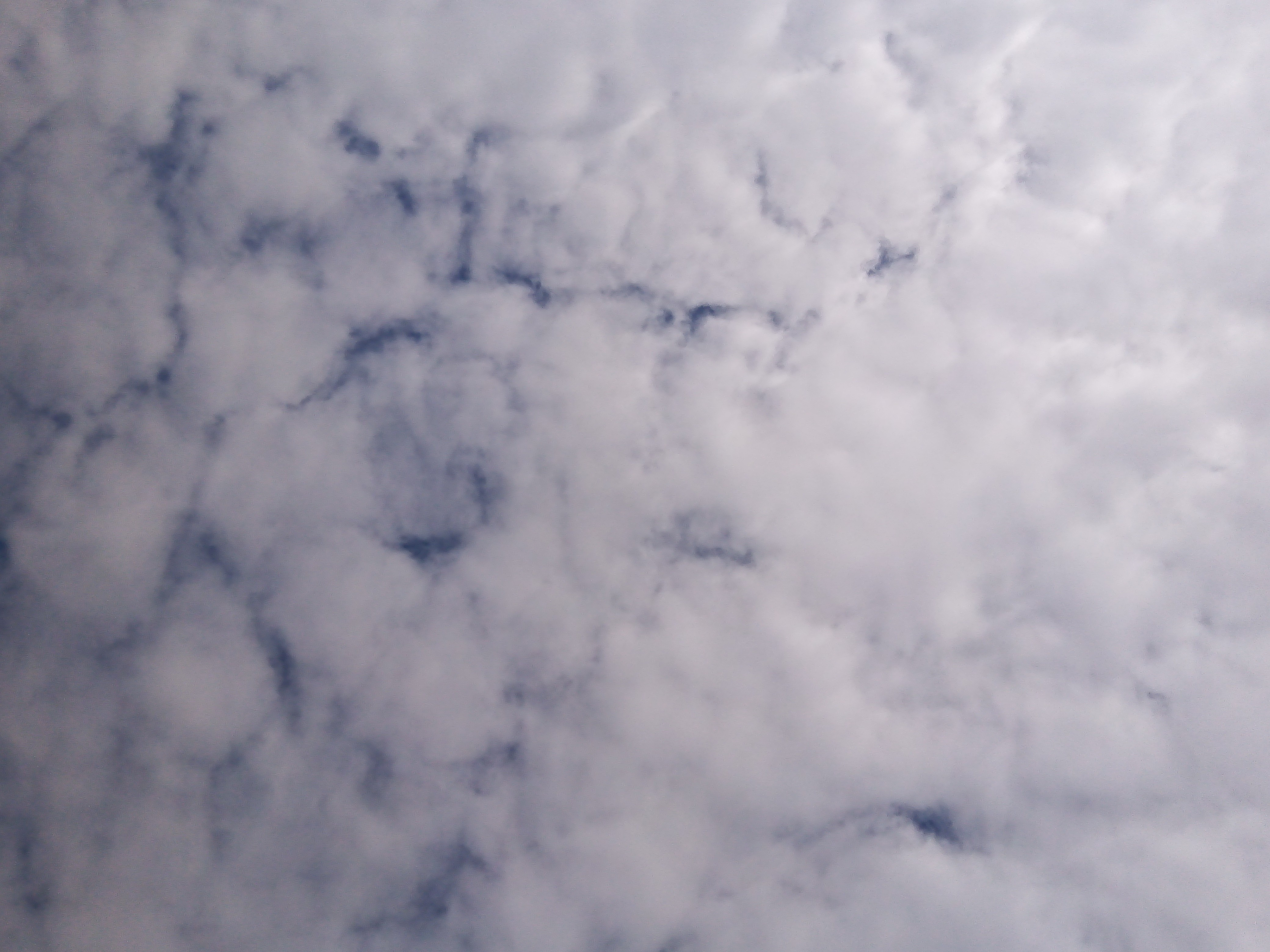
- Altocumulus perlucidus
- Abbreviation: pe
- Genus: stratocumulus, altocumulus
- Variety: perlucidus
- Altitude: 500-7,000 m (2,000-23,000 ft)
- Appearance: Cloud cover with small gaps that make higher cloud types be visible
- Precipitation: Depends on the cloud type this variety is appearing in

Perlucidus is a cloud variety that generally appears in only two cloud types, those being altocumulus and stratocumulus. Perlucidus cloud is easily recognizable by the small ubiquitous gaps that let higher clouds be seen. It forms when shallow convection starts in a cloud layer that did not previously have perlucidus variety characteristics. The gaps between the cloud indicate regions where air is sinking. This cloud variety may appear either as a translucent cloud or an opaque cloud.

== See also ==
- Opacus (cloud variety)
- Translucidus (cloud variety)
