= Translucidus (cloud variety) =

Cloud variety that lets light through

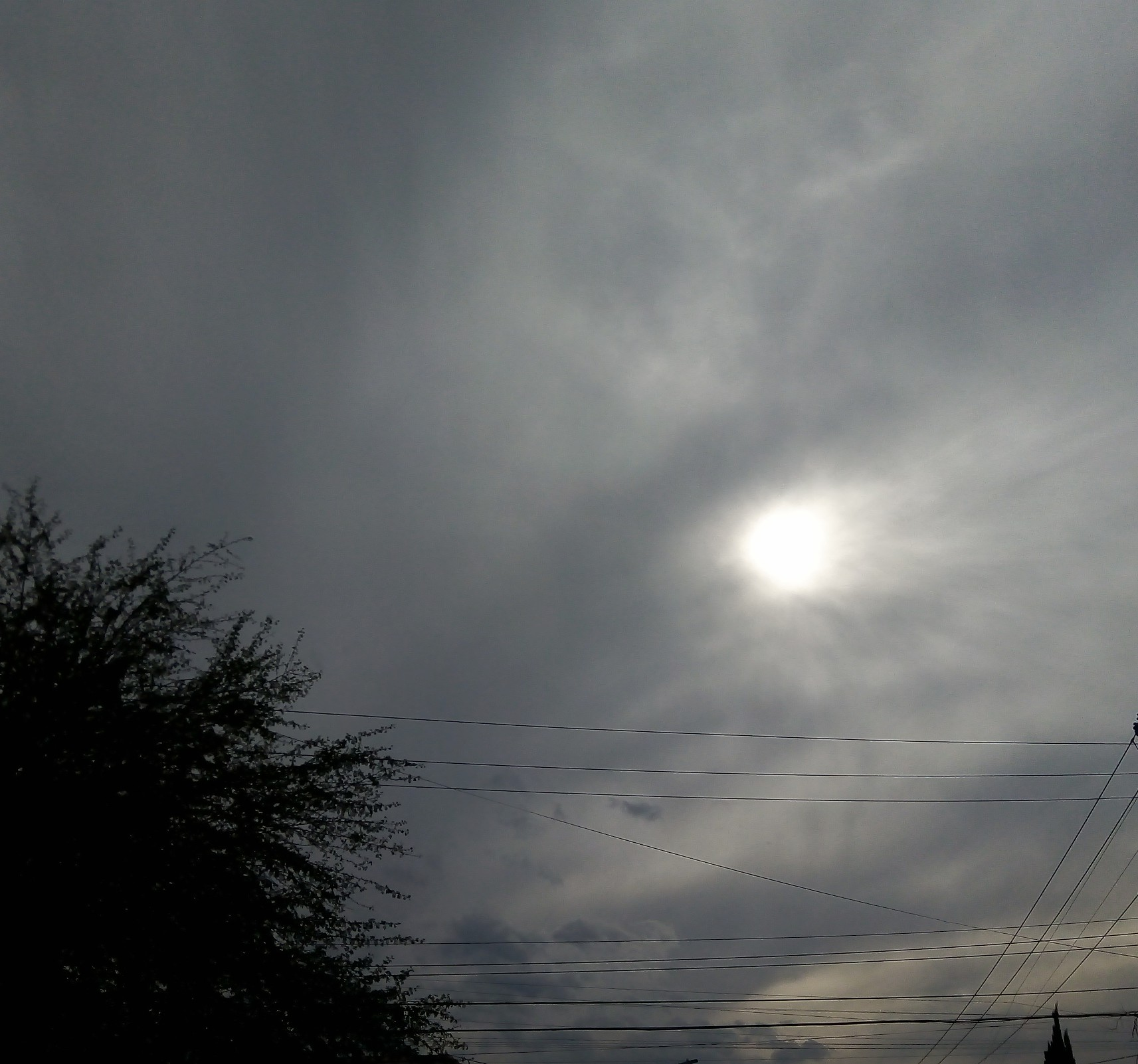
- Altostratus translucidus
- Abbreviation: tr
- Genus: Altostratus, altocumulus, stratocumulus, stratus
- Variety: translucidus
- Altitude: 0-7,000 m (0-23,000 ft)
- Appearance: transparent cloud that gives away the location of the Sun and Moon
- Precipitation: Depends on the cloud type this variety is appearing in

Translucidus is a cloud variety that is translucent and gives away the location of the Sun and Moon. It appears in altocumulus, altostratus, stratus, and stratocumulus clouds. The cloud variety is very recognizable as it gives away the location of the Sun. Sometimes, it lets stars in the night sky be visible. It is the opposite of the cloud variety opacus, which is not translucent, but opaque.

The cloud variety manifests in clouds with thin water particles or ice crystals.

== Examples ==
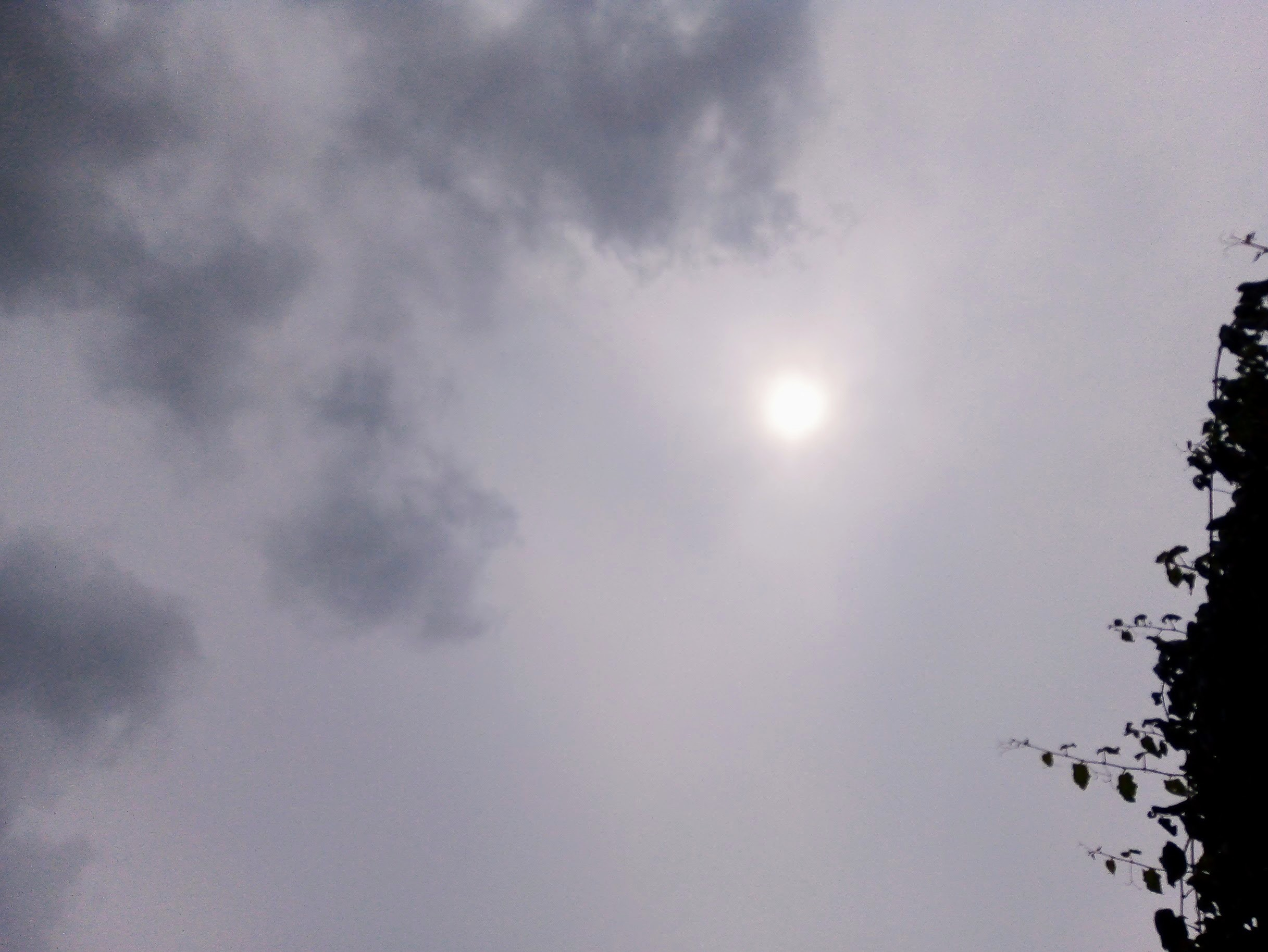
Altostratus translucidus pannus

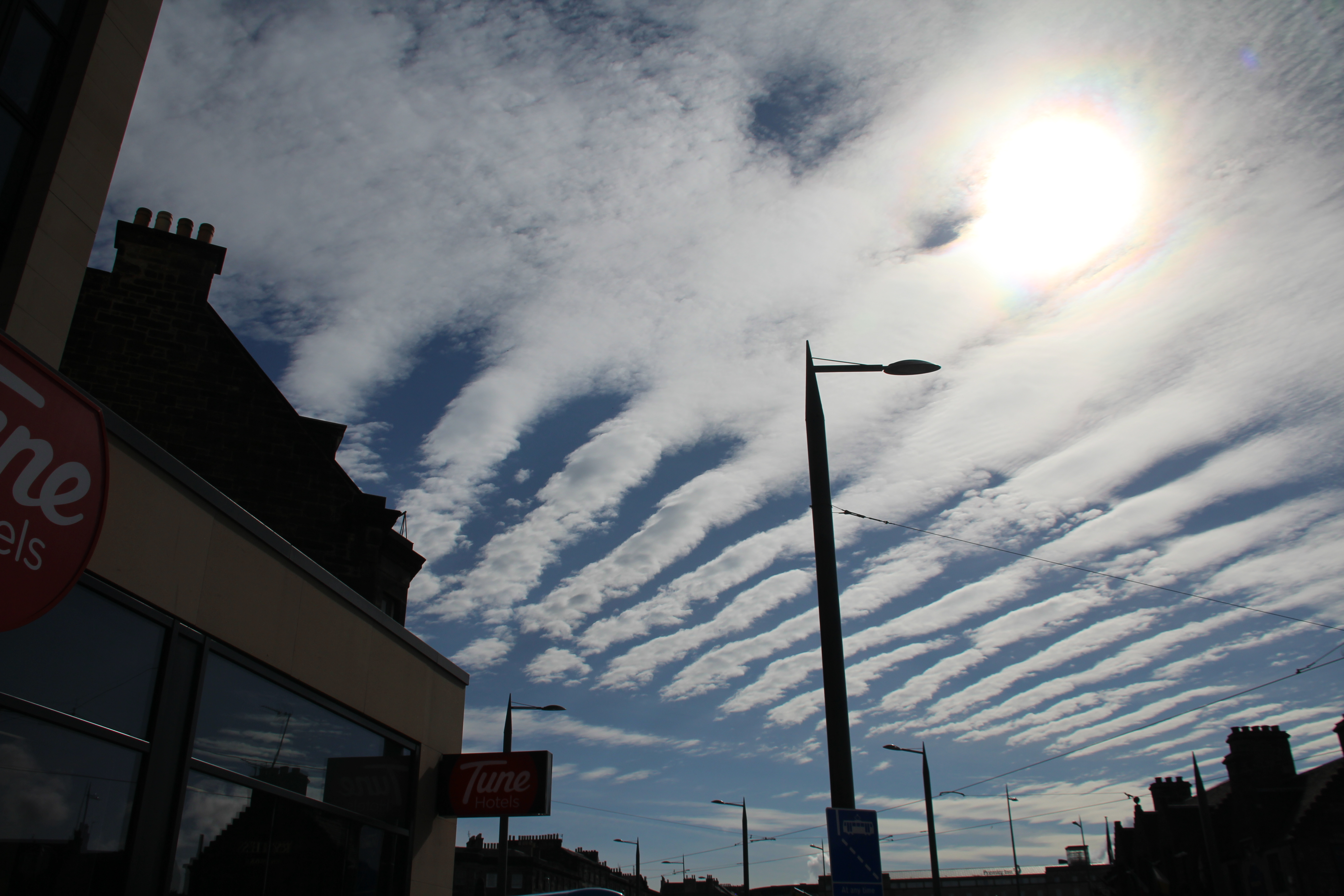
Altocumulus translucidus

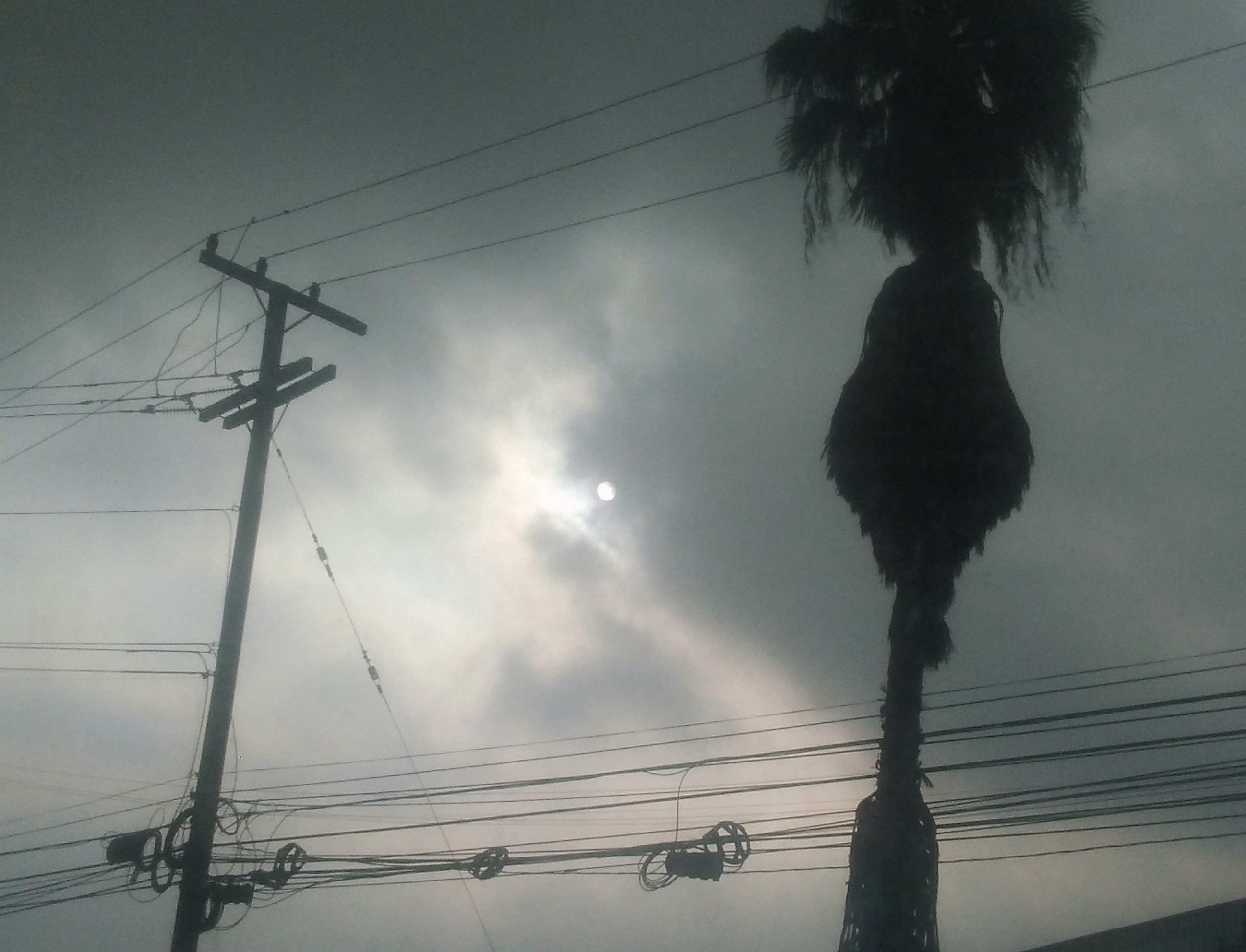
Stratus translucidus

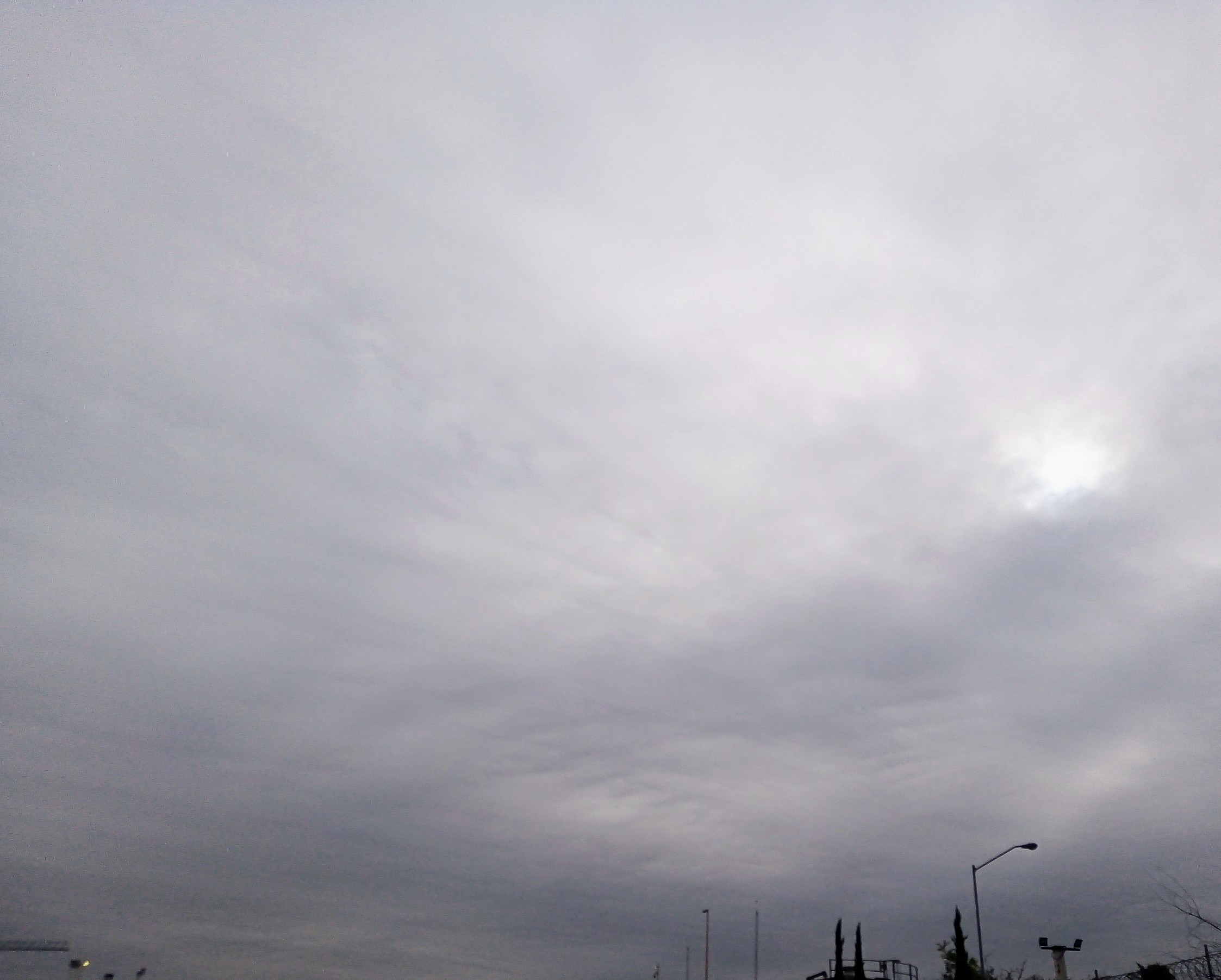
Stratocumulus stratiformis translucidus undulatus

== See also ==
- Perlucidus (cloud variety)
- Opacus (cloud variety)
