= Freezing drizzle =

Light liquid precipitation that freezes on or near a cold surface

Freezing drizzle is drizzle that freezes on contact with the ground or an object at or near the surface. Its METAR code is FZDZ.

== Formation ==
Although freezing drizzle and freezing rain are similar in that they both involve liquid precipitation above the surface in subfreezing temperatures and freeze on the surface, the mechanisms leading to their development are entirely different. Where freezing rain forms when frozen precipitation falls through a melting layer and turns liquid, freezing drizzle forms via the supercooled warm-rain process, in which cloud droplets coalesce until they become heavy enough to fall out of the cloud, but in subfreezing conditions. Despite this process taking place in a subfreezing environment, the liquid water will not freeze if the environmental temperature is above −8 °C (18 °F), via supercooling. If ice crystals are already present in this environment, the liquid droplets will freeze onto these crystals and be effectively removed before they can grow large enough to fall out of the cloud. As a result, freezing drizzle develops in shallow low-level stratus-type clouds where air saturation occurs entirely below the layer in which ice crystals can develop and grow.

== Effects ==
When freezing drizzle accumulates on land, it creates an icy layer of glaze. Freezing drizzle alone does not generally result in significant ice accumulations due to its light, low-intensity nature unlike its rain counterpart. However, even thin layers of slick ice deposited on roads as black ice can be very slippery and cause extremely hazardous conditions resulting in vehicle crashes.

Freezing drizzle is extremely dangerous to aircraft in icing conditions, as the supercooled water droplets will freeze onto the airframe, degrading aircraft performance considerably. The loss and accident of American Eagle Flight 4184 on October 31, 1994, has been attributed to ice buildup due to freezing drizzle aloft.

== See also ==
- Black ice
- Freezing rain
