= Stratus cloud =

Type of cloud

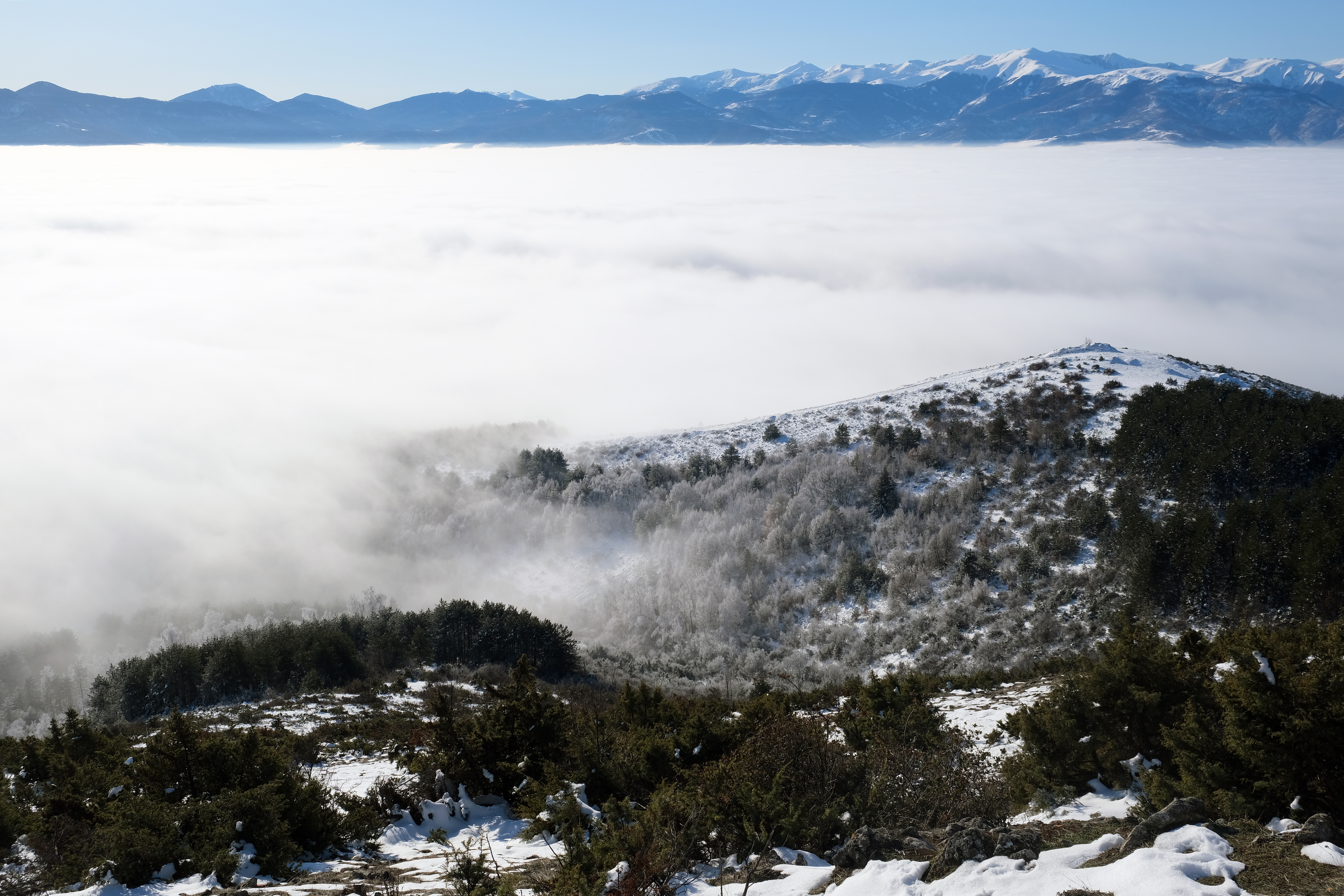
- Typical stratus clouds over Skopje, North Macedonia. The mountains are higher than the cloud top, overlooking a sea of clouds.
- Abbreviation: St
- Genus: Stratus (layered)
- Species: Fractus; Nebulosus
- Variety: Opacus; Translucidus; Undulatus
- Altitude: 0–2,000 m (0–7,000 ft)
- Classification: Family C (Low-level)
- Appearance: Gray, featureless low-altitude cloud capable of ground contact.
- Precipitation: Common Drizzle, freezing drizzle, Snow, or snow grains

Stratus clouds are low-level clouds characterized by horizontal layering with a uniform base, as opposed to convective or cumuliform clouds formed by rising thermals. The term stratus describes flat, hazy, featureless clouds at low altitudes varying in color from dark gray to nearly white. The word stratus is derived from the prefix Strato- meaning 'layer'. Stratus clouds may produce a light drizzle or a small amount of snow. These clouds are essentially above-ground fog formed either through the lifting of morning fog or through cold air moving at low altitudes. Some call these clouds "high fog" for their fog-like form.

== Formation ==
Stratus clouds form when weak vertical currents lift a layer of air off the ground and it depressurizes, following the lapse rate. This causes the humidity to increase due to the adiabatic cooling. This occurs in environments where atmospheric stability is abundant.

== Description ==
Stratus clouds look like featureless gray to white sheets of cloud. They can be composed of water droplets, supercooled water droplets, or ice crystals depending upon the ambient temperature.

== Sub-forms ==
=== Species ===
Stratus nebulosus clouds appear as a featureless or nebulous veil or layer of stratus clouds with no distinctive features or structure. They are found at low altitudes, and are a good sign of atmospheric stability, which indicates continuous stable weather. Stratus nebulosus may produce light rain and drizzle or flakes of snow. Stratus fractus clouds on the other hand, appear with an irregular shape, and forms with a clearly fragmented or ragged appearance. They mostly appear under the precipitation of major rain-bearing clouds; these are nimbostratus and cumulonimbus clouds, and are classified as types of pannus clouds. Stratus fractus can also form beside mountain slopes, without the presence of nimbus clouds (clouds that precipitate), and their color can be from dark grey to almost white.

=== Opacity-based varieties ===
Stratus fractus are not divided into varieties, but stratus nebulosus on the other hand, are divided into two. The Stratus opacus variety appears as a nebulous or milky sheet of the nebulosus species, but are opaque enough to block the sun from view. Stratus Translucidus is another variety of the nebulosus species. These clouds are considered more thin than the opacus variety because this cloud is rather translucent, allowing the position of the Sun or Moon to be observed from Earth's surface.

=== Pattern-based variety ===
Stratus clouds only have one pattern-based variety. This is the stratus undulatus variety. Mild undulations can be observed from this cloud, only associated by the nebulosus species. Though rare, this cloud formation is caused by disturbances on the gentle wind shear. Stratus undulatus clouds are more common on stratus stratocumulomutatus clouds where the wind is stronger as height increases.

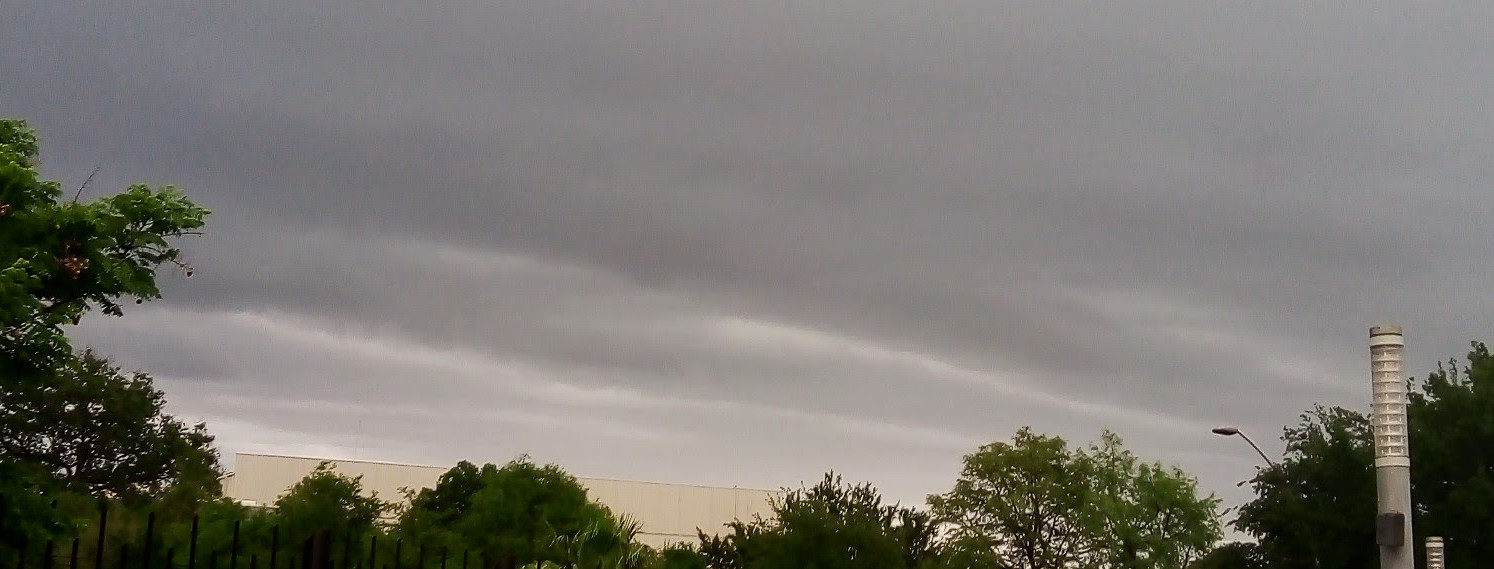
Stratus undulatus clouds during a rainy day.

=== Genitus mother clouds ===
Stratus cumulogenitus clouds occur when the base of cumulus clouds spreads, creating a nebulous sheet of stratiform clouds. This can also occur on nimbostratus clouds (stratus nimbostratogenitus) and on cumulonimbus clouds (stratus cumulonimbogenitus). Stratus fractus clouds can also form under the base of precipitation-bearing clouds and are classified as pannus clouds. Stratus clouds may also form from formation mechanisms that are not typical for the cloud type, for example, Stratus homogenitus, which are stratus formed by human activity, Stratus cataractagenitus, which are formed from the spray of waterfalls, and Stratus silvagenitus, which are formed by evaporation or evapotranspiration occurring in a forest.

=== Mutatus mother cloud ===
Stratus only has one mutatus mother cloud. Stratus stratocumulomutatus clouds occur when stratocumulus opacus patches fuse to create a stratiform layer.

=== Accessory clouds and supplementary feature ===
Stratus clouds do not produce accessory clouds, but a supplementary feature praecipitatio is derived from Latin, which means "precipitation". Stratus clouds are generally too low to produce virga, or rain shears that evaporate before reaching the ground, although higher stratus clouds can produce it.

== Forecast ==
A stratus cloud can form from stratocumulus spreading out under an inversion, indicating a continuation of prolonged cloudy weather with drizzle for several hours and then an improvement as it breaks into stratocumulus. Stratus clouds can persist for days in anticyclone conditions. It is common for a stratus to form on a weak warm front, rather than the usual nimbostratus.

=== Effects on climate ===
According to Sednev, Menon, and McFarquhar, Arctic stratus and other low-level clouds form roughly 50% of the annual cloud cover in Arctic regions, causing a large effect on the energy emissions and absorptions through radiation.

== Relation to other clouds ==
=== Cirrostratus clouds ===
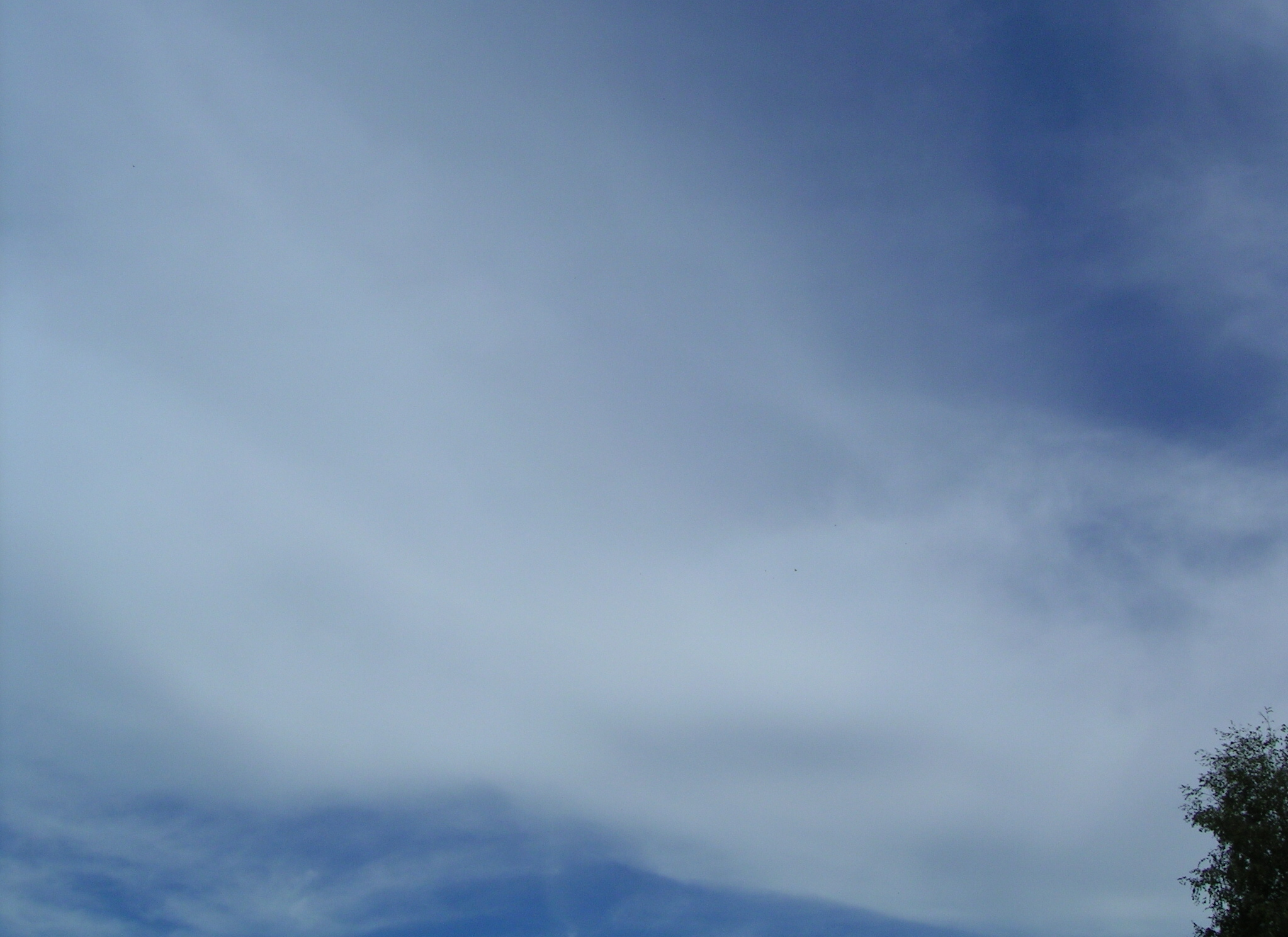
A cirrostratus cloud

Cirrostratus clouds, a very high ice-crystal form of stratiform clouds, can appear as a milky sheen in the sky or as a striated sheet. They are sometimes similar to altostratus and are distinguishable from the latter because the Sun or Moon is always clearly visible through transparent cirrostratus, in contrast to altostratus which tends to be opaque or translucent. Cirrostratus come in two species, fibratus and nebulosus. The ice crystals in these clouds vary depending upon the height in the cloud. Towards the bottom, at temperatures of around −35 °C (−31 °F) to −45 °C (−49 °F), the crystals tend to be long, solid, hexagonal columns. Towards the top of the cloud, at temperatures of around −47 °C (−53 °F) to −52 °C (−62 °F), the predominant crystal types are thick, hexagonal plates and short, solid, hexagonal columns. These clouds commonly produce halos, and sometimes the halo is the only indication that such clouds are present. They are formed by warm, moist air being lifted slowly to a very high altitude. When a warm front approaches, cirrostratus clouds become thicker and descend forming altostratus clouds, and rain usually begins 12 to 24 hours later.

=== Nimbostratus clouds ===
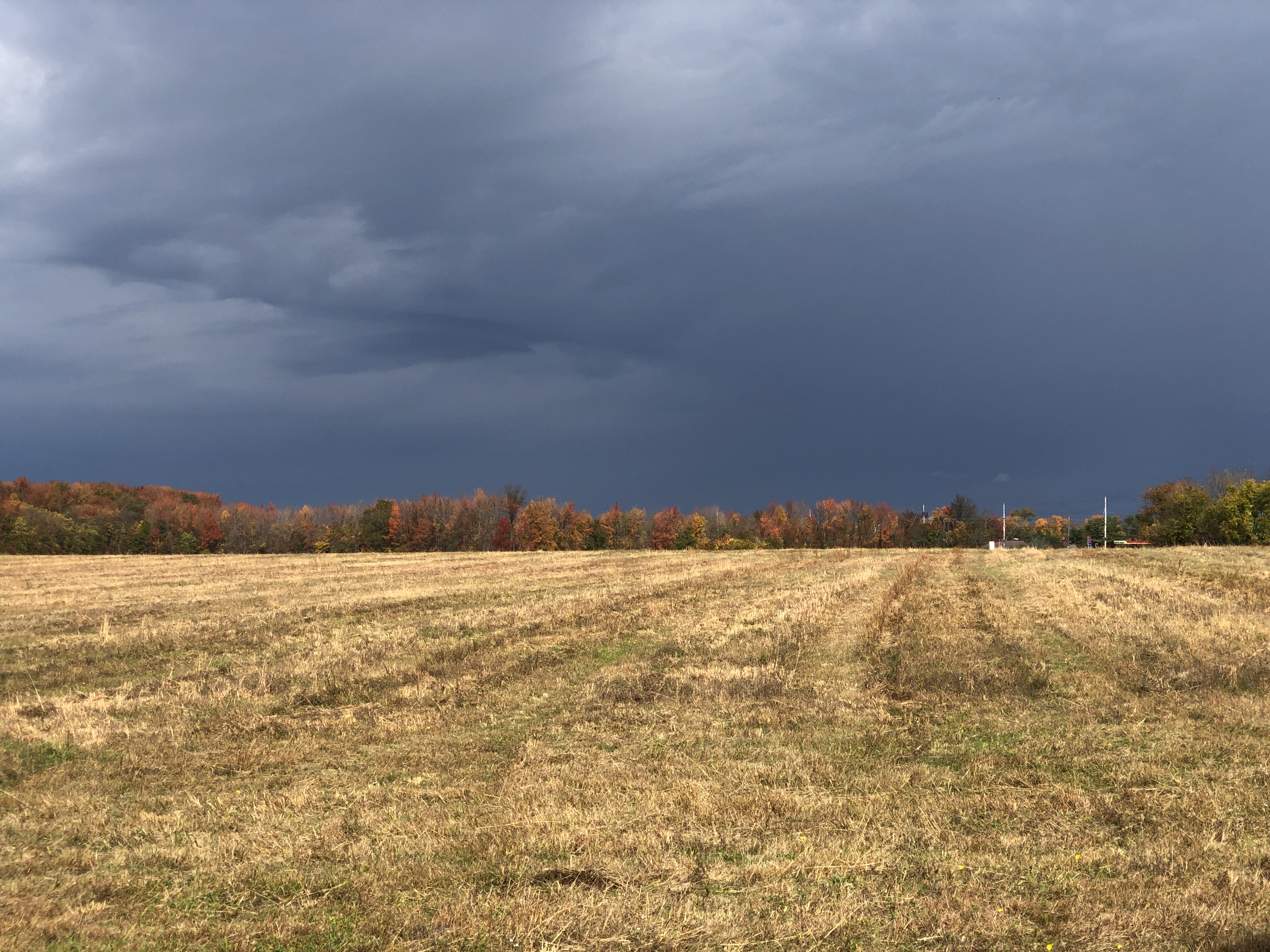
A nimbostratus cloud

Nimbostratus clouds are a type of dark, gray, and flat cloud that produces persistent rain or snow, and does not produce lightning or thunder. It is thick enough to block out sunlight. Elevations that have temperatures below freezing cause water droplets to freeze and turn into ice crystals. The height of the cloud typically reaches between 2–3 kilometres (1.2–1.9 mi). They form when warm, moist air rises, cools down, and condenses into water droplets or ice crystals at a low altitude, which forms the dark gray cloud layer. They are often a sign of a warm or occluded front approaching.

=== Stratocumulus clouds ===
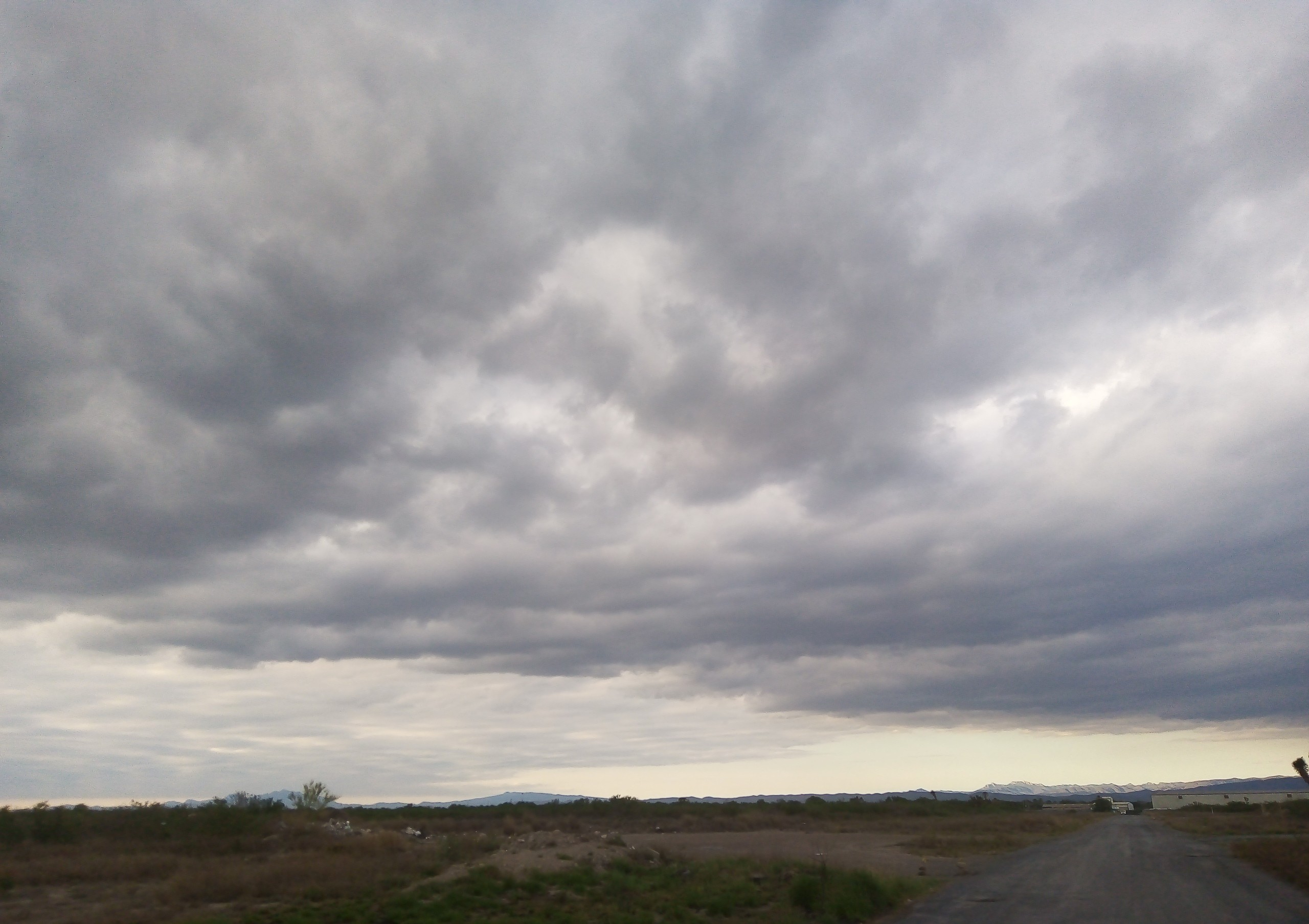
Stratocumulus cloud

A stratocumulus cloud is another type of a cumuliform or stratiform cloud. Like stratus clouds, they form at low levels; but like cumulus clouds (and unlike stratus clouds), they form via convection. Unlike cumulus clouds, their growth is almost completely retarded by a strong inversion, causing them to flatten out like stratus clouds and giving them a layered appearance. These clouds are extremely common, covering on average around twenty-three percent of the Earth's oceans and twelve percent of the Earth's continents. They are less common in tropical areas and commonly form after cold fronts. Additionally, stratocumulus clouds reflect a large amount of the incoming sunlight, producing a net cooling effect. Stratocumulus clouds can produce drizzle, which stabilizes the cloud by warming it and reducing turbulent mixing.

== Sources ==
Footnotes

Bibliography

- Ackerman, Steven A; Knox, John (2003). Meteorology: Understanding the Atmosphere. Brooks Cole. ISBN 053437199X.
- Ahrens, C. Donald (February 2006). Meteorology Today: An Introduction to Weather, Climate, and the Environment (8 ed.). Brooks Cole. ISBN 978-0-495-01162-0. OCLC 693475796.
- Day, John A. (August 2005). The Book of Clouds. Sterling. ISBN 978-1-4027-2813-6. OCLC 61240837.
- Grenci, Lee M.; Nese, Jon M. (August 2001). A World of Weather: Fundamentals of Meteorology: A Text / Laboratory Manual (3 ed.). Kendall Hunt Publishing Company. ISBN 978-0-7872-7716-1. OCLC 51160155.
- Hamilton, Gina (2007). Blue Planet – Air (eBook). Milliken Publishing. ISBN 978-1-4291-1613-8.
- Hubbard, Richard Keith (2000). "Glossary". Boater's Bowditch: The Small Craft American Practical Navigator (2nd ed.). International Marine/Ragged Mountain Press. ISBN 978-0-07-136136-1.
- Parungo, F. (May 1995). "Ice Crystals in High Clouds and Contrails". Atmospheric Research. 38 (1–4): 249–262. Bibcode:1995AtmRe..38..249P. doi:10.1016/0169-8095(94)00096-V. OCLC 90987092.
- Sednev, I; Menon, S; McFarquhar, G (July 2009). "Simulating Mixed-Phase Arctic Stratus Clouds: Sensitivity to Ice Initiation Mechanisms" (PDF). Atmospheric Chemistry and Physics. 9 (14). Copernicus Publications: 4747–4773. doi:10.5194/acp-9-4747-2009.
- Wood, Robert (August 2012). "Stratocumulus Clouds". Monthly Weather Review. 140 (8): 2373–2423. Bibcode:2012MWRv..140.2373W. doi:10.1175/MWR-D-11-00121.1. ISSN 1520-0493.
- Manual on the Observation of Clouds and Other Meteors. International Cloud Atlas: Volume I. World Meteorological Organization (WMO). 1975. ISBN 92-63-10407-7.
