= Drizzle =

Light liquid precipitation

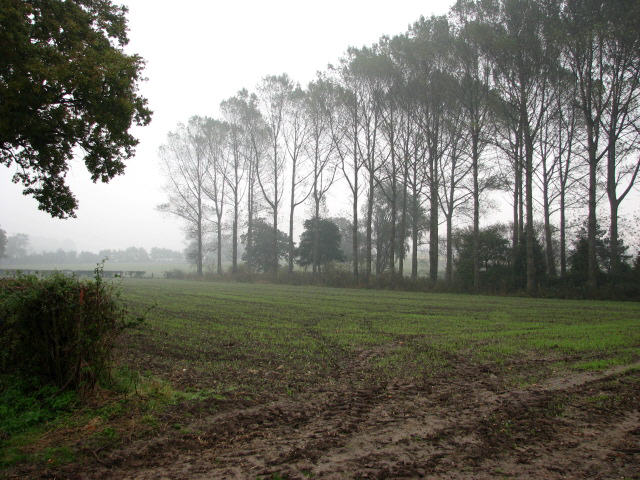
Drizzle in Norfolk, England.

Drizzle is a light, sporadic precipitation which consists of liquid water drops that are smaller than those of normal rain – generally smaller than 0.5 mm (0.02 in) in diameter. Drizzle is normally produced by low stratiform clouds and stratocumulus clouds. Precipitation rates from drizzle are on the order of a millimetre (0.04 in) per day or less at the ground. Owing to the small size of drizzle drops, under many circumstances drizzle largely evaporates before reaching the surface, and so may be undetected by observers on the ground. The METAR code for drizzle is DZ and for freezing drizzle is FZDZ.

== Effects ==
While most drizzle has only a minor immediate impact upon humans, freezing drizzle can lead to treacherous conditions. Freezing drizzle occurs when supercooled drizzle drops land on a surface whose temperature is below freezing. These drops immediately freeze upon impact, leading to the buildup of sheet ice (sometimes called black ice) on the surface of roads.

== Occurrence ==
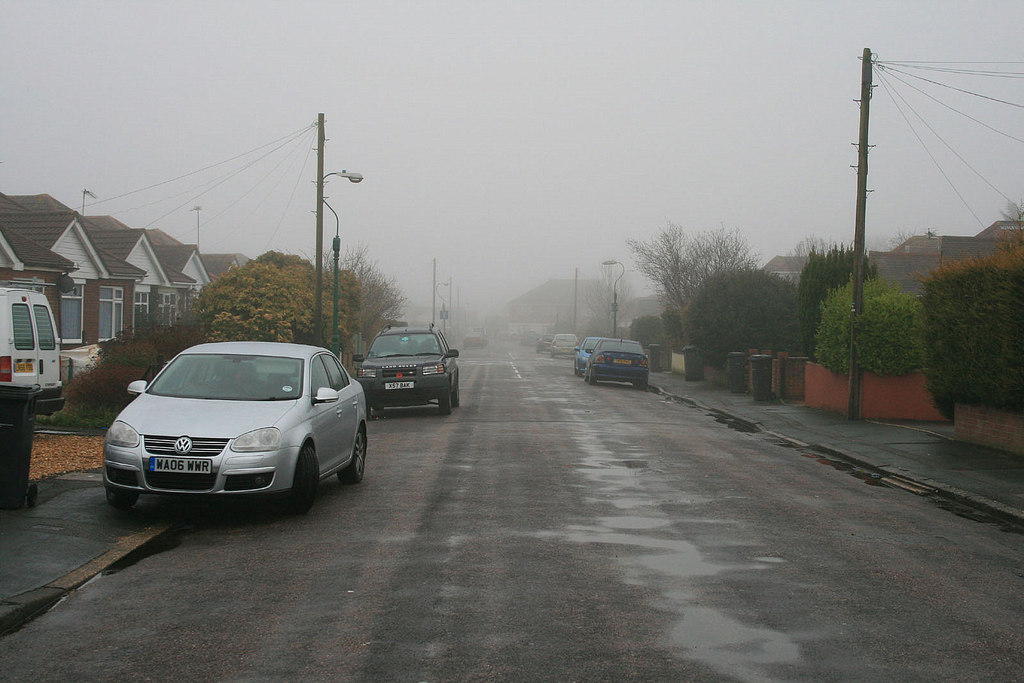
Drizzle in Bournemouth, England.

Drizzle tends to be the most frequent form of precipitation over large areas of the world's oceans, particularly in the colder regions of the subtropics. These regions are dominated by shallow marine stratocumulus and trade wind cumulus clouds, which exist entirely within the marine boundary layer. Despite the low rates of surface accumulation, drizzle exerts a major influence over the structure, coverage, and radiative properties of clouds in these regions.

This has motivated scientists to design more sophisticated and sensitive instruments such as high-frequency radars which can detect drizzle. These studies have shown that the quantity of drizzle is strongly linked to cloud morphology and tends to be associated with updrafts within the marine boundary layer. Increased amounts of drizzle tend to be found in marine clouds that form in clean air masses that have low concentrations of cloud droplets. This interconnection between clouds and drizzle can be explored using high-resolution numerical modelling such as large eddy simulation.

== Influence of aerosols ==
It has been hypothesized by a group of atmospheric scientists at Texas A&M University that particulates in the atmosphere caused by human activities may suppress drizzle. According to this hypothesis, because drizzle can be an effective means of removing moisture from a cloud, its suppression could help to increase the thickness, coverage, and longevity of marine stratocumulus clouds. This would lead to increased cloud albedo on a regional to global scale, and a cooling effect on the atmosphere. Estimates using complex global climate models suggest that this effect may be partially masking the effects of greenhouse gas increases on global surface temperature. However, it is not clear that the representation of the chemical and physical processes needed to accurately simulate the interaction between aerosols, clouds, and drizzle in current (as of 2005) climate models is sufficient to fully understand the global impacts of changes in particulates.

== See also ==
- Fog
- Mist
- Rain
- Snow grains
