= Snow grains =

Form of precipitation

- WMO symbol

Thermal properties
- Melting temperature (T_{m}): 0 °C

Snow grains are a form of precipitation. Snow grains are characterized as very small (<1 mm), white, opaque grains of ice that are fairly flat or elongated. Unlike snow pellets, snow grains do not bounce or break up on impact. Usually, very small amounts fall, mostly from stratus clouds or fog, and never fall in the form of a shower.

The METAR code for snow grains is SG.
