= Hurricane dynamics and cloud microphysics =

Tropical convective clouds play an important part in the Earth's climate system. Convection and release of latent heat transports energy from the surface into the upper atmosphere. Clouds have a higher albedo than the underlying ocean, which causes more incoming solar radiation to be reflected back to space. Since the tops of tropical systems are much cooler than the surface of the Earth, the presence of high convective clouds cools the climate system.

The most recognizable cloud system in the tropics is the hurricane. In addition to the important climatic effects of tropical weather systems, hurricanes possess enough energy to cause massive death and destruction. Therefore, their accurate prediction is of utmost importance.

Cloud microphysics describe the structure and properties of clouds on the microscopic scale.

== Background ==
The Tropical Rainfall Measuring Mission (TRMM) was launched in 1997 to provide quantitative estimates of rainfall over the entire tropics. The satellite uses remote sensing techniques to convert the radiance recorded at the sensor to rainfall values. The most important variable used to constrain the measurements is the properties of the hydrometeors. Hurricanes are mixed-phase clouds, meaning that liquid and solid water (ice) are both present in the cloud. Typically, liquid water dominates at altitudes lower than the freezing level and solid water at altitudes where the temperature is colder than -40 °C. Between 0 °C and -40 °C water can exists in both phases simultaneously. In addition to the phase, the solid water hydrometeors can have different shapes and types that need to be accounted for in the radiative transfer calculations.

In Autumn 1999, the TRMM-Large-Scale Biosphere-Atmosphere Experiment in Amazonia (LBA) field experiment sampled continental and oceanic tropical clouds in Brazil. The goal of TRMM-LBA was to validate the rainfall in cloud resolving models. There have been several in-situ observations of cloud microphysics in tropical clouds which will be discussed here.

Cloud microphysics are the physical processes that describe the growth, decay, and fallout of precipitation particles. In terms of models, cloud microphysics occur on a scale smaller than the grid-scale of the model and have to be parameterized.

Hurricane track forecasts have been getting better in recent years. Looking at the example of Hurricane Rita, the forecast of the National Hurricane Center 36 hours before landfall shifted more than 130 kilometers from the previous forecast, causing an unneeded evacuation. There has been research that has shown that the choice of subgrid-scale parameterization schemes can influence hurricane intensity, track, speed, and precipitation rates. Microphysical assumptions may directly or indirectly modulated storm structure, which result in small changes in the hurricane track which can have societal consequences.

=== Hydrometeor formation and shapes ===
The shape of liquid water drops is generally spherical because of the effects of surface tension. Depending on the size of the drop the friction of the air flowing past a falling drop may squish the bottom on the drop so that it is slightly non-spherical. However, solid ice does not generally form into nice spherical shapes. Ice crystals have a preference to form hexagonal structures by deposition, but can form odd shapes in the presence riming or aggregation into graupel.

The shape of ice particles is mostly dependent on the temperature and supersaturation where they form. The supersaturation is mostly dependent upon the speed in the updraft regions. In regions of high updraft, there are more hydrometeors formed. Graupel is found mostly in regions of weak updrafts. Particle size tends to decrease with increasing altitude because at lower altitudes the larger particles collide and aggregate with the smaller particles. Because updrafts are important for cloud microphysics, it is also necessary to consider how convection parameterization schemes may influence microphysics.

Small errors in the parameterization of the particle size distribution can have large impacts on the calculation of the terminal velocity. The composition, size, and number concentration of particles varies dramatically in stratiform and convective regions. The particle fall speed derived from observations of tropical cyclones varies significantly from those derived from midlatitude systems.

There have been many studies of the feasibility of modifying hurricanes so that they would not be as destructive. Rosenfeld et al. (2007) studied possible modification of Hurricane Katrina (2005). They simulated the seeding of the hurricane by suppressing all warm rain formation in the outer regions of the hurricane. They report that in their simulation the seeded hurricane initially weakened the surface winds in the region of seeding. The eye of the hurricane eventually contracted and became stronger, but the average of the total wind field was weaker. In this best case scenario, they report that seeding reduced the hurricane-force winds by 25%.

Rango and Hobbs (2005) obtained in situ measurements of tropical convective systems. They found that the liquid water content was below adiabatic values. This was true even in newly formed updrafts, suggesting that collision-coalescence and/or entrainment mixing are efficient methods for the removal of liquid water. They noted that the effective radius started to decrease at altitudes above 2–4 km above cloud base, which they attribute to the warm rain process. Ice processes became important at temperatures between -4 °C and -10 °C, and they photographed different shapes including needles, frozen drops, and sheaths. In growing clouds, it was noted that the particle size often grew by riming.

Tokay et al. (2008) studied the raindrop size distribution in topical cyclones. They found high concentrations of small and middle sized drops regardless if larger drops were present. The total number of droplets was between 600 and 1000 m^{−3}, the liquid water content was around 1 g m^{−3}, and a rain rate of approximately 20 mm per hour. The droplets had a mean mass diameter of ~1.6 mm and the maximum diameter recorded was 4.11 mm. There results indicate that prior rain rate estimates from tropical cyclones may have been underestimated due to the differences in microphysics between midlatitude and tropical storms.

In-situ measurements of the microphysics of tropical clouds in the Amazon show that in regions of stronger updrafts contained smaller supercooled water droplets or ice particles than weaker updrafts. In stratiform anvil regions, aggregation into graupel was the main growth mechanism. The speed of the updraft determines if warm rain processes, riming, or aggregation are the primary mechanism of growth in updraft regions.

Heymsfield et al. (2002) also looked at the microphysics of tropical convection, but they limited themselves to the stratiform regions. They observed ice particles of many shapes and sizes. In particular, they noted that rimed particles were found near convective regions, small spheres were found in regions of "transient convection", and at low temperatures cirrus crystals formed. They constructed particle size distributions and noted that they fit particularly well to Gamma distributions and slightly less well to exponential distributions. They noted that their results were similar to results derived from midlatitude systems.

=== Parameterization ===
There are several different cloud microphysics parameterization schemes. Depending on the sophistication of the scheme, the number of ice-phase categories can vary. Many schemes use at least three categories: cloud ice, graupel, and snow. The classification of ice into categories is necessary because different forms of ice will fall at different velocities.

Typically, microphysics schemes will use a mass-weighted average for the fall velocity. McFarquhar and Black (2004) showed that different parameterizing methods results in dramatically different terminal velocities of the hydrometeors.

== Intensity ==
The presence of cloud condensation nuclei (CCN) influences the number of cloud drops that form in a cloud; the more CCN there are, the more cloud droplets that will form. Changes in the CCN concentration and their associated changes in the cloud drop distribution can redistribute the energy within a hurricane. This was known in the 1960s which led scientists to think that hurricanes could be modified by the addition of CCN to produce less intense hurricanes. It was proposed that by seeding with silver iodide outside the eyewall would freeze the supercooled water, release more latent heat, and increase convection. This method was ultimately unsuccessful because of the lack of supercooled water in the tropical cyclone. A different approach seeds the clouds with a large number of small hygroscopic aerosols. The large number of CCN leads to smaller raindrops, less collision-coalescence, and thus less rainout. This water is convected above the freezing level, leading to warming in the upper atmosphere and greater convection.

There have been several modeling studies on the effects of increased CCN on hurricane intensity. Rosenfeld et al.. (2007) used the Weather Research Model (WRF) to simulate Hurricane Katrina, and then turned off the warm rain processes to approximate the effects of adding a large number of CCN. They report that they were successful in simulating key features of Katrina in the control run including the minimum central pressure and maximum wind speeds. When the warm rain processes were removed, the cloud water content naturally increased and the rain water content decreased. The warm rain suppression also changes the thermodynamic structure of the hurricane: temperatures are decreased at low levels at the outer edge of the hurricane. Later, the peak winds decreased along with the central pressure.

Zhu and Zhang (2006) used a mesoscale model to simulate the 1998 Hurricane Bonnie. They report that their control run was reasonably able to simulate the observed hurricane. They then ran a series of sensitivity experiments to examine how changes in the microphysics influence the hurricane. The various sensitivity runs were focused on the effects of ice processes. They report that the tropical cyclones exhibit a large sensitivity in the intensity and core structures to ice phase processes. As the ice processes are removed, the intensity of the cyclone decreases without the Bergeron process. When graupel processes are removed, the storm weakens but not as much as when all ice processes are removed. And when evaporation is turned off, the storm increases in intensity dramatically. They conclude that melting and evaporation processes are important in amplifying tropical cyclones.

Different cumulus parameterization schemes were derived for different situations. The Betts-Miller scheme (or the derivative Betts-Miller-Janjic) attempts to ensure that the local vertical temperature and moisture structures be realistic. The Betts-Miller(-Janjic) scheme is often used when simulating tropical cyclones. Davis and Bosart (2002) simulated Hurricane Diana (1984) which underwent extratropical transition. They used the Betts-Miller-Janjic cumulus parameterization scheme in two ways: one with the parameters set for midlatitude systems and the other for tropical systems. They note that when the parameterization scheme is set for midlatitude systems the simulation produces a more realistic track and storm intensity. However, the tropical simulation produces a more realistic rainfall field.

Pattnaik and Krishnamurtil (2007) simulated Hurricane Charley of 2004 to assess the impact of cloud microphysics on hurricane intensity. They report that their control run was successful in simulating the track, intensity, speed and precipitation. They used the microphysics scheme from NASA Goddard Space Flight Center. This scheme uses five different classifications of cloud water: liquid cloud water, cloud ice, rain water, snow, and hail/graupel. It also allows for supercooled water. Their study attempts to show how fall speed and intercept parameters can influence the tropical cyclone intensity. The size distribution of precipitation particles is parametrized as:

N(D)=N_{0}e^{−λD}dD

where N is the number of precipitation particles between a given diameter D and D + dD, N_{0} is the intercept parameter, λ is the slope parameter, and D is the diameter of the particles. They used the same model and microphysics scheme, turning off different microphysical mechanisms to understand which ones are the most important. They note that modifications to the microphysics scheme dramatically impacted the hurricane intensity. The most intense hurricanes were when melting was suppressed, or when no evaporation was allowed. They interpret this as meaning that the energy needed to either melt or evaporate the particles could instead be used to heat the air column, which increased convection leading to a stronger storm. During the weakest simulated storm, the fall speed of the snow and graupel particles was increased. The increased rate of fallout also increased the evaporation, leading to weakened convection. Changes in the intercept parameter showed little change. This implies that the total number of particles does not matter as much as the relative distribution between different sizes of particles.

A series of simulations which principally looked at how cloud microphysics affect hurricane track also revealed that subgrid-scale turbulent mixing parameterization schemes influenced the intensity of a hurricane simulation more than its track.

== Track ==
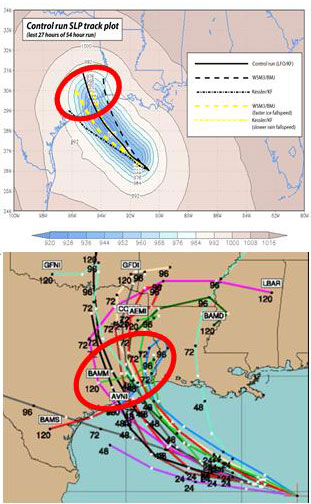
Results from Fovell and Su (2007) Top: WRF model simulation of Hurricane Rita tracks. Bottom: The spread of NHC multi-model ensemble forecast.

Though not the main goal, two work of Rosenfeld et al.. (2007) noted that in their simulations that the suppression of warm rain through the addition of large amounts of aerosols will cause the tropical cyclone to divert eastward. Zhu and Zhang (2006) report that the hurricane track was not sensitive to cloud microphysical processes except for very weak storms, which were pushed to the east. In a series of sensitivity studies, Pattnaik and Krishnamurti conclude that microphysical processes have little effect on hurricane track.

Davis and Bosart (2002) considered, among other things, the effects of cumulus parameterization on tropical storm track. They found that changes in potential vorticity at the tropopause can cause changes in the wind field. Specifically, different schemes have different methods of parametrizing the potential vorticity which results in different tracks. They found that the Betts-Miller-Janjic and Grill schemes produced a more westward track than Kain-Fritsch. The Kain-Fritsch scheme tended to intensify the storm too rapidly but produced the best track compared with observations. The simulated tracks of more intense storms tends to be farther to the east compared with weaker storms. Davis and Bosart also point out that their results differ from previous sensitivity studies on cumulus parameterizations which found that the Betts-Miller-Janjic scheme tended to have better results. They attribute this difference to the differences in grid spacing between the studies.

The first paper published that specifically looked at the impacts of cloud microphysics on hurricane track wa Fovell and Su (2007). They use simulations of Hurricane Rita (2005) and an idealized hurricane simulation to see how different microphysical parameterization and convection schemes change the hurricane track. They compared the effects of the Kessler (K), Lin et al. (L), and the three class WRF single moment (WFR3) schemes, coupled with the effects of Kain-Fritsch (KF), Grell-Devenyi (GD), and Betts-Miller-Janjic (BMJ) convective parameterization schemes. The hurricane that most similarly simulated Rita's track was when the WSM3 microphysics scheme was paired with BMJ convection. The worst simulated track was when the K microphysics was paired with KF convection, which produced a weaker storm that tracked well west of the actual storm. The spread from simply changing the microphysics and cumulus convection parameterization schemes produced the same spread in hurricane tracks as the National Hurricane Center ensemble.

They also note that the biggest difference between the microphysics parameterizations is that K does not include any ice phases. The differences between the crystalline nature of cloud ice and snow, compared with the spherical nature of raindrops, and the semi-spherical shape of graupel will likely produce different fall velocities when frozen water is included in the parameterizations. They used the most accurate member of the Rita simulations and changed the microphysics so that the fall speed of the ice particles would have the same fall velocity as if they were liquid raindrops with the same mass. They report that this changed the track of the hurricane so that it tracked further to the west, similar to the K scheme.

In addition to simulating Hurricane Rita, Fovell and Su (2007) also made the same simulations as before, but on a smaller grid size so that cumulus parameterization was not needed. They found that the hurricane produced by the K scheme was weaker than the rest and had the most westward track. They conclude that the different implicit microphysical assumption in the different schemes can change the hurricane track on forecasting timescales. In general, their results suggest that larger-sized hurricanes will track further westward, which is consistent with "beta drift".

When an idealized set of hurricanes was produced with no large-scale flow, with variable Coriolis parameter, they found that the hurricanes still moved in the northeast to north-northeast direction. However, the different microphysical schemes tracked at different directions. Since there was no large-scale flow, they conclude that the differences in the track represent changes in the vortex motion caused by changes in the microphysics. On a constant f-plane experiment, there was no movement of the storms. They note that variations among the NWS consensus model results could be primarily due to how the different models parameterize their cloud microphysics and other subgrid-scale processes.

Recently, Fovell et al. (2009) conducted a modeling study of hurricanes in idealized environments. The model had a constant sea surface temperature, no background wind, but with Earth rotation. They then inserted a vortex with varying microphysics schemes and noted that the tracks diverged. They used the same microphysics schemes as F07, and like F07 the noted that the K storm moved faster and further westward than storm produced with other microphysics schemes. An earlier study by Fiorino and Elsberry (1989) showed that hurricane track and speed can be changed by simply changing the tangential winds in the outer part of the storm because they helped determine the orientation and strength of the beta gyres. The F09 storm with the K microphysics parameterization had the largest eye and the strongest winds at large radii, while the L storm was most intense and WSM3 had the most compact eye.

F09 noted that storm with stronger outer winds tracked more to the northwest than storms with weak winds. They hypothesize that this can be explained with an atmosphere in hydrostatic balance. Assuming an atmosphere that is in hydrostatic balance, the average column virtual temperature contributes the most to the surface pressure. The virtual temperatures of the three F09 storms varied with the Kessler storm having temperatures several degrees warmer than the other storms. The winds are determined by the radial pressure gradients, which are related to the temperature gradients. Therefore, storms that have a large radial variation in virtual temperature will have stronger outer winds. The temperature differences between the models can be explained by the change in radiative heating and cooling. The K microphysics scheme produced particle fall speeds that were slower than the others, thereby increasing the size of its anvil. F09 report that the most important factor that influences the size of the anvil is the terminal velocity, and that the terminal velocity of the particles depends on their geometry, density, and size. Interactions between the anvil and incoming and emitted radiation changes the radial temperature gradient, leading to changes in the track direction.

Fovell et al. conclude that the choice of microphysics schemes can lead to changes in the terminal velocities of the particles in the anvil which could lead to increases or decreases in the size of the anvil. Schemes that produce heavier particles that will fall faster (like K) produce worse results. They conclude by warning that any changes in storm track or speed that are initially caused by microphysics could be amplified by other dynamic factors such as the steering flow or sea surface temperatures.
