= Cloud physics =

Study of the physical processes in atmospheric clouds

Cloud physics is the study of the physical processes that lead to the formation, evolution and impacts of atmospheric clouds, including precipitation and cloud radiative effects.

Clouds consist of particles that include liquid droplets, raindrops, ice particles made of pristine ice crystals, aggregates, graupel and hail. Cloud droplets can be a few micrometres in diameter, whilst graupel can be several millimetres, and hail can be larger still. The aggregate effect of these particles results in the properties of clouds we commonly observe, including their brightness (i.e. how they reflect or absorb sunlight), or precipitation development. Clouds can consist solely of liquid droplets (often called "warm" clouds) or ice particles (cold clouds), or a combination of both (mixed-phase clouds), along with microscopic particles of dust, smoke, or other matter, which can act as condensation nuclei.

Cloud condensation nuclei (CCN) are necessary for cloud droplet formation at supersaturation values observed, allowing droplets to form as a result of the combined effects of the Kelvin effect and Raoult's law. The Kelvin effect describes the change in saturation vapour pressure due to a curved surface. Raoult's law describes how the vapor pressure is dependent on the amount of solute in a solution. At concentrations typical of CCN, when the cloud droplets are small, the supersaturation required for condensation to occur is smaller than without the presence of a soluble (or partially soluble) CCN. Cloud drops can freeze to become ice crystals at temperatures as high as -5 ^{o}C if suitable ice nucleating particles (INP) are present. Ice particles grow at lower temperatures where the Bergeron process dominates.

The warm-rain process involves the collision and coalescence of cloud drops of different sizes. Collisions can take place as a result of either different drop fall speeds or in-cloud turbulence. When the drops become large enough (greater than around 0.1 mm), they can fall as precipitation. Other important processes that form precipitation are riming, when a supercooled liquid drop collides with a solid snowflake, and aggregation, when two solid snowflakes collide and combine.

The precise mechanics of how a cloud forms and evolves is not completely understood, but scientists have developed theories explaining the structure of clouds by studying the microphysics of individual cloud particles. For example, in-situ airborne measurements have shown that ice particle concentrations can be many orders of magnitude greater than expected from pristine ice formation, so research has identified a number of potential secondary ice production (SIP) mechanisms. Advances in weather radar and satellite technology have also allowed the precise study of clouds on a large scale.

== History of research ==
Modern cloud physics began in the 19th century and was described in several publications. Otto von Guericke originated the idea that clouds were composed of water bubbles. In 1847 Augustus Waller used spider web to examine droplets under the microscope. These observations were confirmed by William Henry Dines in 1880 and Richard Assmann in 1884.

== Cloud formation ==
=== Cooling air to its dew point ===
Cloud evolution in under a minute.

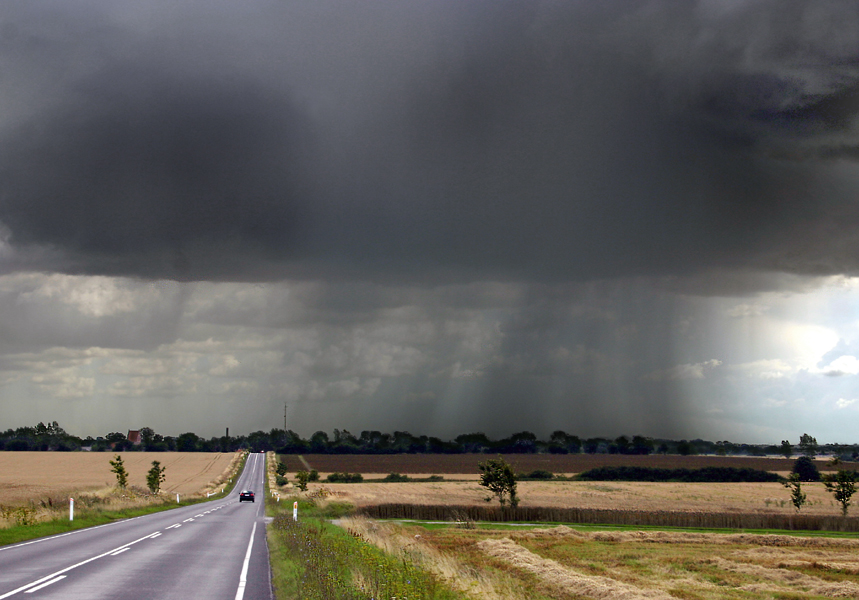
Late-summer rainstorm in Denmark. Nearly black color of base indicates main cloud in foreground probably cumulonimbus.

==== Adiabatic cooling ====
As water evaporates from an area of Earth's surface, the air over that area becomes moist. Moist air is lighter than the surrounding dry air, creating an unstable situation. When enough moist air has accumulated, all the moist air rises as a single packet, without mixing with the surrounding air. As more moist air forms along the surface, the process repeats, resulting in a series of discrete packets of moist air rising to form clouds.

This process occurs when one or more of three possible lifting agents—cyclonic/frontal, convective, or orographic—causes air containing invisible water vapor to rise and cool to its dew point, the temperature at which the air becomes saturated. The main mechanism behind this process is adiabatic cooling. Atmospheric pressure decreases with altitude, so the rising air expands in a process that expends energy and causes the air to cool, which makes water vapor condense into cloud. Water vapor in saturated air is normally attracted to condensation nuclei such as dust and salt particles that are small enough to be held aloft by normal circulation of the air. The water droplets in a cloud have a normal radius of about 0.002 mm (0.00008 in). The droplets may collide to form larger droplets, which remain aloft as long as the velocity of the rising air within the cloud is equal to or greater than the terminal velocity of the droplets.

For non-convective cloud, the altitude at which condensation begins to happen is called the lifted condensation level (LCL), which roughly determines the height of the cloud base. Free convective clouds generally form at the altitude of the convective condensation level (CCL). Water vapor in saturated air is normally attracted to condensation nuclei such as salt particles that are small enough to be held aloft by normal circulation of the air. If the condensation process occurs below the freezing level in the troposphere, the nuclei help transform the vapor into very small water droplets. Clouds that form just above the freezing level are composed mostly of supercooled liquid droplets, while those that condense out at higher altitudes where the air is much colder generally take the form of ice crystals. An absence of sufficient condensation particles at and above the condensation level causes the rising air to become supersaturated and the formation of cloud tends to be inhibited.

===== Frontal and cyclonic lift =====
Frontal and cyclonic lift occur in their purest manifestations when stable air, which has been subjected to little or no surface heating, is forced aloft at weather fronts and around centers of low pressure. Warm fronts associated with extratropical cyclones tend to generate mostly cirriform and stratiform clouds over a wide area unless the approaching warm airmass is unstable, in which case cumulus congestus or cumulonimbus clouds will usually be embedded in the main precipitating cloud layer. Cold fronts are usually faster moving and generate a narrower line of clouds which are mostly stratocumuliform, cumuliform, or cumulonimbiform depending on the stability of the warm air mass just ahead of the front.

===== Convective lift =====
Another agent is the buoyant convective upward motion caused by significant daytime solar heating at surface level, or by relatively high absolute humidity. Incoming short-wave radiation generated by the sun is re-emitted as long-wave radiation when it reaches Earth's surface. This process warms the air closest to ground and increases air mass instability by creating a steeper temperature gradient from warm or hot at surface level to cold aloft. This causes it to rise and cool until temperature equilibrium is achieved with the surrounding air aloft. Moderate instability allows for the formation of cumuliform clouds of moderate size that can produce light showers if the airmass is sufficiently moist. Typical convection upcurrents may allow the droplets to grow to a radius of about 0.015 millimetres (0.0006 in) before precipitating as showers. The equivalent diameter of these droplets is about 0.03 millimetres (0.001 in).

If air near the surface becomes extremely warm and unstable, its upward motion can become quite explosive, resulting in towering cumulonimbiform clouds that can cause severe weather. As tiny water particles that make up the cloud group together to form droplets of rain, they are pulled down to earth by the force of gravity. The droplets would normally evaporate below the condensation level, but strong updrafts buffer the falling droplets, and can keep them aloft much longer than they would otherwise. Violent updrafts can reach speeds of up to 180 miles per hour (290 km/h). The longer the rain droplets remain aloft, the more time they have to grow into larger droplets that eventually fall as heavy showers.

Rain droplets that are carried well above the freezing level become supercooled at first then freeze into small hail. A frozen ice nucleus can pick up 0.5 inches (1.3 cm) in size traveling through one of these updrafts and can cycle through several updrafts and downdrafts before finally becoming so heavy that it falls to the ground as large hail. Cutting a hailstone in half shows onion-like layers of ice, indicating distinct times when it passed through a layer of super-cooled water. Hailstones have been found with diameters of up to 7 inches (18 cm).

Convective lift can occur in an unstable air mass well away from any fronts. However, very warm unstable air can also be present around fronts and low-pressure centers, often producing cumuliform and cumulonimbiform clouds in heavier and more active concentrations because of the combined frontal and convective lifting agents. As with non-frontal convective lift, increasing instability promotes upward vertical cloud growth and raises the potential for severe weather. On comparatively rare occasions, convective lift can be powerful enough to penetrate the tropopause and push the cloud top into the stratosphere.

===== Orographic lift =====
A third source of lift is wind circulation forcing air over a physical barrier such as a mountain (orographic lift). If the air is generally stable, nothing more than lenticular cap clouds will form. However, if the air becomes sufficiently moist and unstable, orographic showers or thunderstorms may appear.

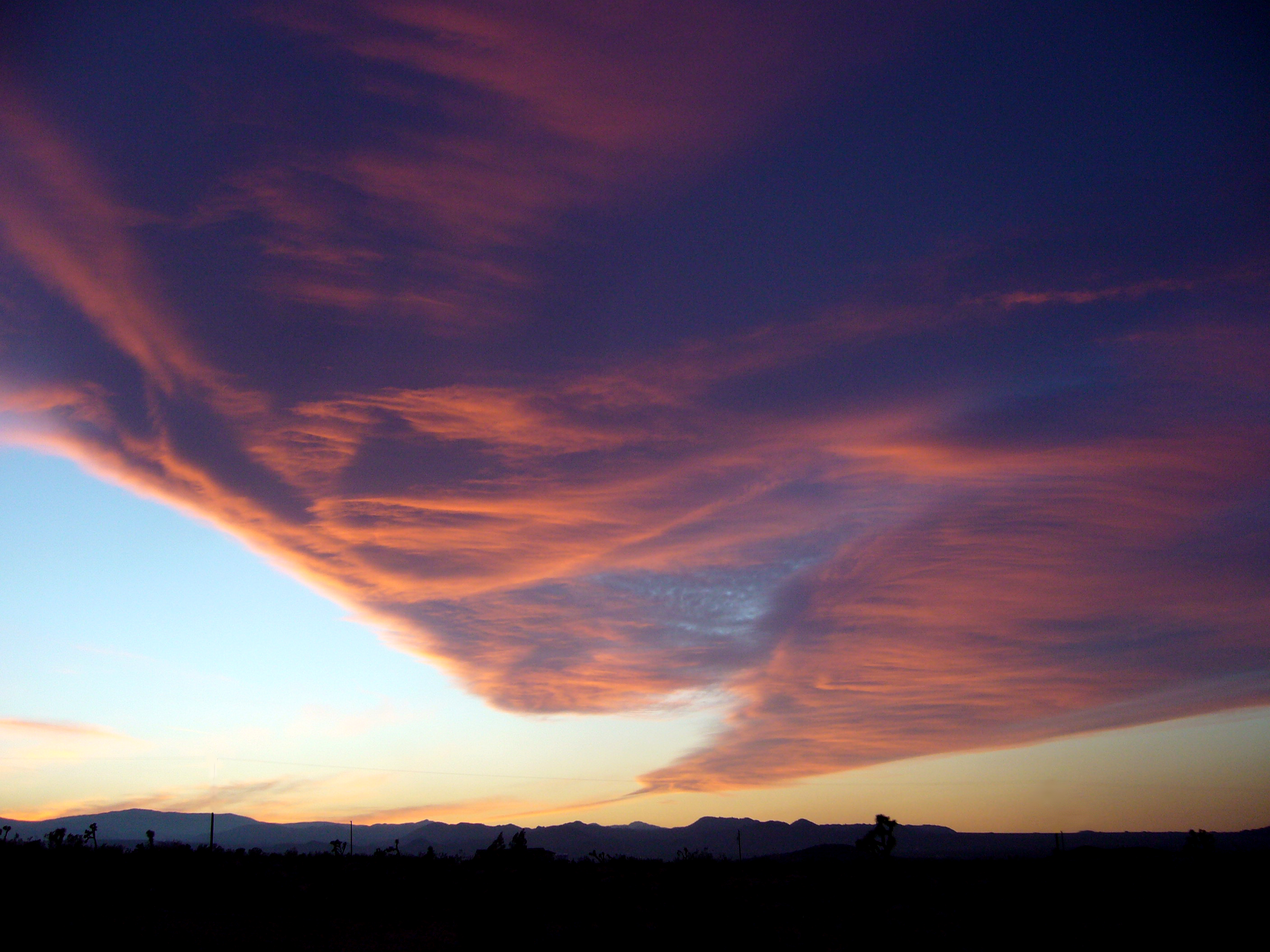
Windy evening twilight enhanced by the Sun's angle, can visually mimic a tornado resulting from orographic lift

==== Non-adiabatic cooling ====
Along with adiabatic cooling that requires a lifting agent, there are three other main mechanisms for lowering the temperature of the air to its dew point, all of which occur near surface level and do not require any lifting of the air. Conductive, radiational, and evaporative cooling can cause condensation at surface level resulting in the formation of fog. Conductive cooling takes place when air from a relatively mild source area comes into contact with a colder surface, as when mild marine air moves across a colder land area. Radiational cooling occurs due to the emission of infrared radiation, either by the air or by the surface underneath. This type of cooling is common during the night when the sky is clear. Evaporative cooling happens when moisture is added to the air through evaporation, which forces the air temperature to cool to its wet-bulb temperature, or sometimes to the point of saturation.

=== Adding moisture to the air ===
There are five main ways water vapor can be added to the air. Increased vapor content can result from wind convergence over water or moist ground into areas of upward motion. Precipitation or virga falling from above also enhances moisture content. Daytime heating causes water to evaporate from the surface of oceans, water bodies or wet land. Transpiration from plants is another typical source of water vapor. Lastly, cool or dry air moving over warmer water will become more humid. As with daytime heating, the addition of moisture to the air increases its heat content and instability and helps set into motion those processes that lead to the formation of cloud or fog.

=== Supersaturation ===
The amount of water that can exist as vapor in a given volume increases with the temperature. When the amount of water vapor is in equilibrium above a flat surface of water the level of vapor pressure is called saturation and the relative humidity is 100%. At this equilibrium there are equal numbers of molecules evaporating from the water as there are condensing back into the water. If the relative humidity becomes greater than 100%, it is called supersaturated. Supersaturation occurs in the absence of condensation nuclei.

Since the saturation vapor pressure is proportional to temperature, cold air has a lower saturation point than warm air. The difference between these values is the basis for the formation of clouds. When saturated air cools, it can no longer contain the same amount of water vapor. If the conditions are right, the excess water will condense out of the air until the lower saturation point is reached. Another possibility is that the water stays in vapor form, even though it is beyond the saturation point, resulting in supersaturation.

Supersaturation of more than 1–2% relative to water is rarely seen in the atmosphere, since cloud condensation nuclei are usually present. Much higher degrees of supersaturation are possible in clean air, and are the basis of the cloud chamber.

There are no instruments to take measurements of supersaturation in clouds.

=== Supercooling ===
Water droplets commonly remain as liquid water and do not freeze, even well below 0 °C (32 °F). Ice nuclei that may be present in an atmospheric droplet become active for ice formation at specific temperatures in between 0 °C (32 °F) and −38 °C (−36 °F), depending on nucleus geometry and composition. Without ice nuclei, supercooled water droplets (as well as any extremely pure liquid water) can exist down to about −38 °C (−36 °F), at which point spontaneous freezing occurs.

=== Collision-coalescence ===
One theory explaining how the behavior of individual droplets in a cloud leads to the formation of precipitation is the collision-coalescence process. Droplets suspended in the air will interact with each other, either by colliding and bouncing off each other or by combining to form a larger droplet. Eventually, the droplets become large enough that they fall to the earth as precipitation. The collision-coalescence process does not make up a significant part of cloud formation, as water droplets have a relatively high surface tension. In addition, the occurrence of collision-coalescence is closely related to entrainment-mixing processes.

=== Primary ice production (PIP) ===
Ice crystals in clouds and the atmosphere can be produced from supercooled liquid or ice-supersaturated vapour via homogeneous or heterogeneous ice nucleation. This is referred to as primary ice production (PIP), in contrast to ice production from ice crystals that already exist, known as secondary ice production.

==== Homogeneous ice nucleation ====
Homogeneous ice nucleation occurs in supercooled liquid droplets without the presence of a foreign substance that can aid the nucleation. For a typical water droplet in Earth's atmosphere, the likelihood of homogeneous ice nucleation increases with supercooling and typically occurs between -35 °C and -38 °C. Classical Nucleation Theory describes this process and how it depends on temperature, droplet volume, the thermodynamic activity of the water, and time.

==== Heterogeneous ice nucleation ====
Heterogeneous ice nucleation occurs when the nucleation is initiated by a foreign substance that reduces the supercooling (or ice-supersaturation) required; the substances that can achieve this are referred to as ice-nucleating particles or ice nuclei. Some important, naturally occurring, ice-nucleating particles in the atmosphere include mineral dust from deserts and soils, sea spray aerosols, biological material, carbonaceous particles, and volcanic ash. Man-made particles, such as silver iodide and Pseudomonas syringae, are also known to be effective ice-nucleating particles. Heterogeneous ice nucleation can occur via several mechanisms or modes, including immersion mode (where the substance is immersed within the droplet), deposition mode (where ice-supersaturated vapour deposits directly onto the substance), or contact mode (where freezing of a supercooled droplet occurs upon contact with the substance).

==== Artificially influencing ice nucleation ====
A process whereby scientists seed a cloud with artificial ice nuclei to encourage precipitation is known as cloud seeding. This can help cause precipitation in clouds that otherwise may not rain. Cloud seeding adds excess artificial ice nuclei which shifts the balance so that there are many nuclei compared to the amount of super cooled liquid water. An over seeded cloud will form many particles, but each will be very small. This can be done as a preventative measure for areas that are at risk for hail storms.

=== Secondary ice production (SIP) ===
Secondary ice production (SIP) generates new ice crystals through interactions with pre-existing ice particles in clouds. SIP can enhance ice particle number concentrations, often by many orders of magnitude above the expected ice particle number concentration from PIP (e.g.,). The SIP-driven enhancement of ice particle concentrations influences ice particle properties, precipitation, lifetime and radiative properties of clouds.

SIP mechanisms operate under different thermodynamic and microphysical conditions, including rime splintering (e.g., the Hallett-Mossop process), collision fragmentation, shattering of freezing droplets, and fragmentation during ice sublimation. Despite research dating back to the 1940s, challenges remain in representing SIP in climate and atmospheric models, along with large uncertainties persisting around its influences on cloud properties.

=== Bergeron process ===
The primary mechanism for the growth of ice cloud particles was discovered by Tor Bergeron. The Bergeron process notes that the saturation vapor pressure of water, or how much water vapor a given volume can contain, depends on what the vapor is interacting with. Specifically, the saturation vapor pressure with respect to ice is lower than the saturation vapor pressure with respect to water. Water vapor interacting with a water droplet may be saturated, at 100% relative humidity, when interacting with a water droplet, but the same amount of water vapor would be supersaturated when interacting with an ice particle. The water vapor will attempt to return to equilibrium, so the extra water vapor will condense into ice on the surface of the particle. These ice particles end up as the nuclei of larger ice crystals. This process only happens at temperatures between 0 °C (32 °F) and −40 °C (−40 °F). Below −40 °C (−40 °F), liquid water will spontaneously nucleate, and freeze. The surface tension of the water allows the droplet to stay liquid well below its normal freezing point. When this happens, it is now supercooled liquid water. The Bergeron process relies on super cooled liquid water (SLW) interacting with ice nuclei to form larger particles. If there are few ice nuclei compared to the amount of SLW, droplets will be unable to form. This means that clouds that form in very cold air, for example in the Arctic, are particularly sensitive to ice nucleation. However, concentrations of ice nucleation particles (INPs) are relatively low in the Arctic and research has suggested that INPs such as mineral dust are likely to have been transported over long distances from lower latitudes.

== Cloud classification ==
Clouds in the troposphere, the atmospheric layer closest to Earth, are classified according to the height at which they are found, and their shape or appearance. There are five forms based on physical structure and process of formation. Cirriform clouds are high, thin and wispy, and are seen most extensively along the leading edges of organized weather disturbances. Stratiform clouds are non-convective and appear as extensive sheet-like layers, ranging from thin to very thick with considerable vertical development. They are mostly the product of large-scale lifting of stable air. Unstable free-convective cumuliform clouds are formed mostly into localized heaps. Stratocumuliform clouds of limited convection show a mix of cumuliform and stratiform characteristics which appear in the form of rolls or ripples. Highly convective cumulonimbiform clouds have complex structures often including cirriform tops and stratocumuliform accessory clouds.

These forms are cross-classified by altitude range or level into ten genus types which can be subdivided into species and lesser types. High-level clouds form at altitudes of 5 to 12 kilometers. All cirriform clouds are classified as high-level and therefore constitute a single cloud genus cirrus. Stratiform and stratocumuliform clouds in the high level of the troposphere have the prefix cirro- added to their names yielding the genera cirrostratus and cirrocumulus. Similar clouds found in the middle level (altitude range 2 to 7 kilometers) carry the prefix alto- resulting in the genus names altostratus and altocumulus.

Low level clouds have no height-related prefixes, so stratiform and stratocumuliform clouds based around 2 kilometres or lower are known simply as stratus and stratocumulus. Small cumulus clouds with little vertical development (species humilis) are also commonly classified as low level.

Cumuliform and cumulonimbiform heaps and deep stratiform layers often occupy at least two tropospheric levels, and the largest or deepest of these can occupy all three levels. They may be classified as low or mid-level, but are also commonly classified or characterized as vertical or multi-level. Nimbostratus clouds are stratiform layers with sufficient vertical extent to produce significant precipitation. Towering cumulus (species congestus), and cumulonimbus may form anywhere from near the surface to intermediate heights of around 3 kilometres. Of the vertically developed clouds, the cumulonimbus type is the tallest and can virtually span the entire troposphere from a few hundred metres above the ground up to the tropopause. It is the cloud responsible for thunderstorms.

Some clouds can form at very high to extreme levels above the troposphere, mostly above the polar regions of Earth. Polar stratospheric clouds are seen but rarely in winter at altitudes of 18 to 30 kilometers, while in summer, noctilucent clouds occasionally form at high latitudes at an altitude range of 76 to 85 kilometers. These polar clouds show some of the same forms as seen lower in the troposphere.

Homospheric types determined by cross-classification of forms and levels.

Forms and levels	Stratiform non-convective	Cirriform mostly non-convective	Stratocumuliform limited-convective	Cumuliform free-convective	Cumulonimbiform strong-convective
Extreme level	PMC: Noctilucent veils	Noctilucent billow or whirls	Noctilucent bands		
Very high level	Nitric acid & water PSC	Cirriform nacreous PSC	Lenticular nacreous PSC		
High-level	Cirrostratus	Cirrus	Cirrocumulus		
Mid-level	Altostratus		Altocumulus		
Low-level	Stratus		Stratocumulus	Cumulus humilis or fractus	
Multi-level or moderate vertical	Nimbostratus			Cumulus mediocris	
Towering vertical				Cumulus congestus	Cumulonimbus

Homospheric types include the ten tropospheric genera and several additional major types above the troposphere. The cumulus genus includes four species that indicate vertical size and structure.

== Determination of properties ==
Cloud properties are studied using in-situ measurement (often using aircraft), and ground-based or satellite-based remote sensing. Remote sensing can be based on imaging, lidar or radar.

=== In-situ measurement ===
Research aircraft are commonly used to study the above microphysical processes in clouds, often in the context of the cloud dynamics. A range of cloud probes are frequently deployed on wing pods or elsewhere on the aircraft fuselage. These are utilised to determine: the cloud droplet size distributions; cloud liquid water content; the size and concentration of raindrops; and the shape, size and concentration of ice particles, including graupel. Some instruments are capable of distinguishing between the liquid and solid phase of particles. Various flight patterns are used to gain an understanding of the development of the particles, depending on the goals of the project. Statistical flying is often used when there is a field of approximately homogeneous clouds. Flights to evaluate satellite data, or to gather multiple vertical profiles through shallow clouds often use sawtooth flight patterns. Many projects involve multiple aircraft and/or other facilities, such as ground-based instruments, drones, radars, and satellite instruments.

=== Ground-based remote sensing ===
Surface‑based remote sensing plays a key role in understanding cloud properties by using instruments that probe the atmosphere from the ground. Cloud radars and lidars provide high‑resolution observations of cloud structure, with millimetre‑wave cloud radars detecting cloud particle distributions and lidars detecting thin clouds and aerosols with high sensitivity. For example, across Europe, ACTRIS (Aerosol, Clouds, and Trace Gases Research Infrastructure) sites deploy synergistic combinations of Doppler cloud radars, lidars, microwave radiometers, and other instruments to produce continuous, vertical profiles of cloud fraction and water and ice cloud properties, supported by standardized Cloudnet processing and quality‑controlled data products. In addition, weather surveillance radars transmit microwave pulses at longer wavelengths (centimetre scale) to determine the location, intensity, and motion of hydrometeors within clouds, complementing the information gained from shorter wavelengths which can become attenuated once clouds begin precipitating.

=== Satellite-based remote sensing ===
Satellites are used to gather data about cloud properties and other information such as Cloud Amount, height, IR emissivity, visible optical depth, icing, effective particle size for both liquid and ice, and cloud top temperature and pressure. Data sets regarding cloud properties are gathered using satellites, such as MODIS, POLDER, CALIPSO or ATSR. The instruments measure the radiances of the clouds, from which the relevant parameters can be retrieved. This is usually done by using inverse theory. The method of detection is based on the fact that the clouds tend to appear brighter and colder than the land surface. Because of this, difficulties rise in detecting clouds above bright (highly reflective) surfaces, such as oceans and ice.

The value of a certain parameter is more reliable the more satellites are measuring the said parameter. This is because the range of errors and neglected details varies from instrument to instrument. Thus, if the analysed parameter has similar values for different instruments, it is accepted that the true value lies in the range given by the corresponding data sets.

The Global Energy and Water Cycle Experiment uses the following quantities in order to compare data quality from different satellites in order to establish a reliable quantification of the properties of the clouds:

- the cloud cover or cloud amount with values between 0 and 1
- the cloud temperature at cloud top ranging from 150 to 340 K
- the cloud pressure at top 1013 - 100 hPa
- the cloud height, measured above sea level, ranging from 0 to 20 km
- the cloud IR emissivity, with values between 0 and 1, with a global average around 0.7
- the effective cloud amount, the cloud amount weighted by the cloud IR emissivity, with a global average of 0.5
- the cloud (visible) optical depth varies within a range of 4 and 10.
- the cloud water path for the liquid and solid (ice) phases of the cloud particles
- the cloud effective particle size for both liquid and ice, ranging from 0 to 200 μm

Another vital property is the icing characteristic of various cloud genus types at various altitudes, which can have great impact on the safety of flying. The methodologies used to determine these characteristics include using CloudSat data for the analysis and retrieval of icing conditions, the location of clouds using cloud geometric and reflectivity data, the identification of cloud types using cloud classification data, and finding vertical temperature distribution along the CloudSat track (GFS).

The range of temperatures that can give rise to icing conditions is defined according to cloud types and altitude levels:

Low-level stratocumulus and stratus can cause icing at a temperature range of 0 to -10 °C.
For mid-level altocumulus and altostratus, the range is 0 to -20 °C.
Vertical or multi-level cumulus, cumulonimbus, and nimbostatus, create icing at a range of 0 to -25 °C.
High-level cirrus, cirrocumulus, and cirrostratus generally cause no icing because they are made mostly of ice crystals colder than -25 °C.

== Models ==
There are three main modeling approaches for simulating the dynamics of sizes of particles in clouds, which can be classified as either Eulerian or Lagriangian in terms of formulation of dynamics in particle attribute space:

Eulerian microphysics approaches:

- bulk (in which moment based description of particle attribute distribution is used, with assumed size/mass distributions),
- bin (in which nonparametric histogram-based description of particle attribute space is used, possibly involving moment-based description within each histogram bin);

Lagrangian microphysics approaches:

- particle-based or super-droplet (in zero spatial dimensions as in cloud parcel models, analogous to moving-sectional/method-of-characteristics/method-of-lines descriptions).

The most common model type is bulk microphysics that uses mean values to describe the cloud properties (e.g. rain water content, ice content), the properties can represent only the first order (concentration) or also the second order (mass). Bin microphysics schemes that keep the moments (mass or concentration) in different variables for different sizes of particles. The bulk microphysics models are much faster than the bin models but are less accurate. Particle-based microphysics may be based on probabilistic (Monte Carlo) models of processes such us coagulation, nucleation and transport, and their computational cost is lower than for bin schemes if multiple particle parameters need to be tracked in a simulation (e.g., aerosol properties).

== See also ==
- Hurricane dynamics and cloud microphysics
