= Susannah Burrows =

American atmospheric scientist

Susannah M. Burrows is an American atmospheric scientist and aerobiologist at the Pacific Northwest National Laboratory whose research focuses on airborne bacteria and other biological particles in the atmosphere, and their role in ice nucleation.

== Education and career ==
Burrows credits her interest in science to an elementary school teacher in State College, Pennsylvania, and a high school teacher in earth sciences who led her on a summer fieldwork expedition and from there to a poster presentation to the American Meteorological Society. She studied both physics and German at Oberlin College, where she graduated in 2005. For an honors project in physics, she traveled to the South Pole to measure carbon monoxide in the mesosphere. She continued her studies in meteorology in Germany at the University of Mainz, where she received a diploma (the equivalent of a master's degree) in 2008 and completed a doctorate (Dr. rer. nat.), summa cum laude, in 2011.

She joined the Pacific Northwest National Laboratory as a postdoctoral researcher in 2012, and has remained there as a permanent staff researcher.

== Recognition ==
Burrows was a 2018 recipient of the Pacific Northwest National Laboratory's Ronald L. Brodzinski Early Career Exceptional Achievement Award, "recognized for her leadership in advancing understanding connections between biological systems on land and ocean and their chemistry, and physical climate processes in the atmosphere". She was a 2025 recipient of the Presidential Early Career Award for Scientists and Engineers, honored "for intellectual leadership in the basic science underpinning process interactions and modeling of cloud condensation and ice nuclei, implementing new discoveries into Earth system prediction capabilities, and dedication to communication and integration within the broader research community".
