= Wegener–Bergeron–Findeisen process =

Process of ice crystal growth in clouds

The Wegener–Bergeron–Findeisen process (named after Alfred Wegener, Tor Bergeron, and Walter Findeisen), or "cold-rain process", is a process of ice crystal growth that occurs in mixed phase clouds (containing a mixture of supercooled water and ice) in regions where the ambient vapor pressure falls between the saturation vapor pressure over water and the lower saturation vapor pressure over ice. This is a subsaturated environment for liquid water but a supersaturated environment for ice, resulting in rapid evaporation of liquid water and rapid ice crystal growth through vapor deposition. If the number density of ice is small compared to liquid water, the ice crystals can grow large enough to fall out of the cloud, melting into raindrops if lower-level temperatures are warm enough.

The Wegener–Bergeron–Findeisen process, if occurring at all, is much more efficient in producing large particles than is the growth of larger droplets at the expense of smaller ones, since the difference in saturation pressure between liquid water and ice is larger than the enhancement of saturation pressure over small droplets (for droplets large enough to considerably contribute to the total mass).

== History ==
The principle of ice growth through vapor deposition on ice crystals at the expense of water was first theorized by the German scientist Alfred Wegener in 1911 while studying hoarfrost formation. Wegener theorized that if this process happened in clouds and the crystals grew large enough to fall out, it could be a viable precipitation mechanism. While his work with ice crystal growth attracted some attention, it would take another 10 years before its application to precipitation would be recognized.

In the winter of 1922, Tor Bergeron made a curious observation while walking through the woods. He noticed that on days when the temperature was below freezing, the stratus deck that typically covered the hillside stopped at the top of the canopy instead of extending to the ground as it did on days when the temperature was above freezing. Being familiar with Wegener's earlier work, Bergeron theorized that ice crystals on the tree branches were scavenging vapor from the supercooled stratus cloud, preventing it from reaching the ground.

In 1933, Bergeron was selected to attend the International Union of Geodesy and Geophysics meeting in Lisbon, Portugal, where he presented his ice crystal theory. In his paper, he stated that if the ice crystal population was significantly small compared to the liquid water droplets, the ice crystals could grow large enough to fall out (Wegener's original hypothesis). Bergeron theorized that this process could be responsible for all rain, even in tropical climates, a statement that caused quite a bit of disagreement between tropical and mid-latitude scientists. In the late 1930s, German meteorologist Walter Findeisen extended and refined Bergeron's work through both theoretical and experimental work.

== Required conditions ==
The condition that the number of droplets should be much larger than the number of ice crystals depends on the fraction of cloud condensation nuclei that would later (higher in the cloud) act as ice nuclei. Alternatively, an adiabatic updraft has to be sufficiently fast so that high supersaturation causes the spontaneous nucleation of many more droplets than present cloud condensation nuclei. In either case, this should happen not far below the freezing point, as this would cause direct nucleation of ice. The growth of the droplets would prevent the temperature from soon reaching the point of fast nucleation of ice crystals.

The larger supersaturation with respect to ice, once present, causes it to grow fast, thus scavenging water from the vapor phase. If the vapor pressure $p$ drops below the saturation pressure with respect to liquid water $p_w$, the droplets will cease to grow. This may not occur if $p_w$ itself is dropping rapidly, depending on the slope of the saturation curve, the lapse rate, and the speed of the updraft; or if the drop of $p$ is slow, depending on the number and size of the ice crystals. If the updraft is too fast, all the droplets would finally freeze rather than evaporate.

A similar limit is encountered in a downdraft. Liquid water evaporates, causing the vapor pressure $p$ to rise, but if the saturation pressure with respect to ice $p_i$ is rising too fast in the downdraft, all ice would melt before large ice crystals have formed.

Korolev and Mazin derived expressions for the critical updraft and downdraft speed:

$$u_{up} = \frac{p_w - p_i}{p_i} \eta N_i \bar{r_i} \,$$
$$u_{dn} = \frac{p_i - p_w}{p_w} \chi N_w \bar{r_w} \,$$

where $\eta$ and $\chi$ are coefficients dependent on temperature and pressure, $N_i$ and $N_w$ are the number densities of ice and liquid particles (respectively), and $\bar{r_i}$ and $\bar{r_w}$ are the mean radius of ice and liquid particles (respectively).

For values of $N_i \bar{r_i}$ typical of clouds, $u_{up}$ ranges from a few cm/s to a few m/s. These velocities can be easily produced by convection, waves, or turbulence, indicating that it is not uncommon for both liquid water and ice to grow simultaneously. In comparison, for typical values of $N_w \bar{r_w}$, downdraft velocities larger than a few m/s are required for both liquid and ice to shrink simultaneously. These velocities are common in convective downdrafts but are not typical for stratus clouds.

== Formation of ice crystals ==
The most common way to form an ice crystal starts with an ice nucleus in the cloud. Ice crystals can form from heterogeneous deposition, contact, immersion, or freezing after condensation. In heterogeneous deposition, an ice nucleus is simply coated with water. For contact, ice nuclei will collide with water droplets that freeze upon impact. In immersion freezing, the entire ice nucleus is covered in liquid water.

Water will freeze at different temperatures depending upon the type of ice nuclei present. Ice nuclei cause water to freeze at higher temperatures than it would spontaneously. For pure water to freeze spontaneously, called homogeneous nucleation, cloud temperatures would have to be −35 °C (−31 °F). Here are some examples of ice nuclei:

Ice nuclei	Temperature to freeze
Bacteria	−2.6 °C (27.3 °F)
Kaolinite	−30 °C (−22 °F)
Silver iodide	−10 °C (14 °F)
Vaterite	−9 °C (16 °F)

== Ice multiplication ==
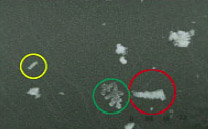
Different ice crystals present together in a cloud

As the ice crystals grow, they can bump into each other and splinter and fracture, resulting in many new ice crystals. There are many shapes of ice crystals to bump into each other. These shapes include hexagons, cubes, columns, and dendrites. This process is referred to as "ice enhancement" by atmospheric physicists and chemists.

== Aggregation ==
The process of ice crystals sticking together is called aggregation. This happens when ice crystals are slick or sticky at temperatures of −5 °C (23 °F) and above because of a coating of water surrounding the crystal. The different sizes and shapes of ice crystals fall at different terminal velocities and commonly collide and stick.

== Accretion ==
Accretion (or riming) occurs when an ice crystal collides with supercooled water droplets. Droplets freeze upon impact and can form graupel. If the graupel formed is reintroduced into the cloud by wind, it may continue to grow larger and denser, eventually forming hail.

== Precipitation ==
Eventually, this ice crystal will grow heavy enough to fall. It may even collide with other ice crystals and grow larger still through collision coalescence, aggregation, or accretion.

The Wegener–Bergeron–Findeisen process often results in precipitation. As the crystals grow and fall, they pass through the base of the cloud, which may be above freezing. This causes the crystals to melt and fall as rain. There also may be a layer of air below freezing below the cloud base, causing the precipitation to refreeze in the form of ice pellets. Similarly, the layer of air below freezing may be at the surface, causing the precipitation to fall as freezing rain. The process may also result in no precipitation, evaporating before it reaches the ground, in the case of forming virga.

== See also ==
- List of meteorology topics
- Precipitation (meteorology)
- Coalescence (meteorology)
- Ice nucleus
- Ice
- Nucleation
- Physical vapor deposition
- Saturation vapor pressure
- Cloud physics
