= Precipitation =

Condensed water vapor that falls from clouds

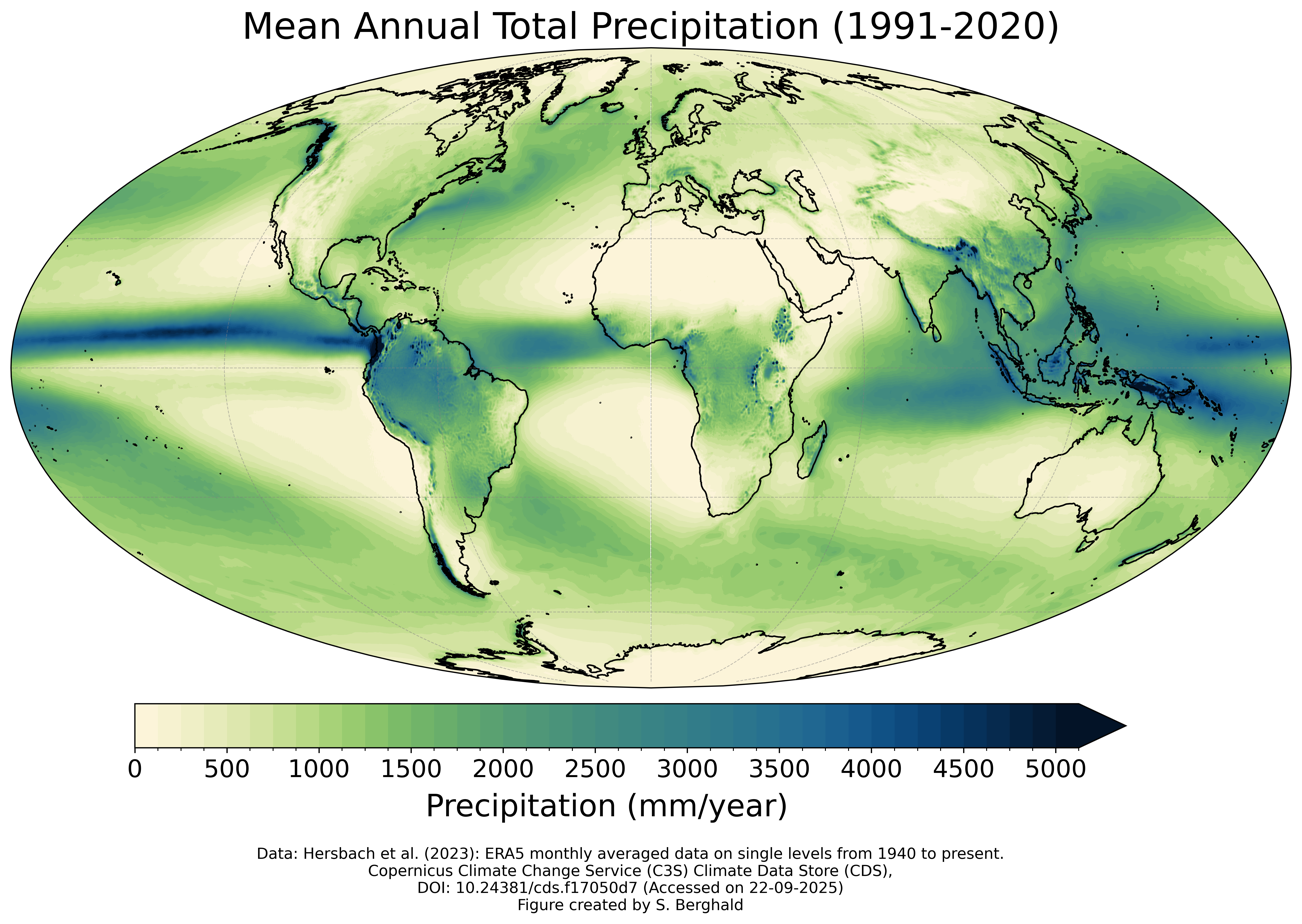
30-year (1991–2020) mean annual total precipitation based on ERA5 reanalysis data.

In meteorology, precipitation is any product of the condensation of atmospheric water vapor that falls from clouds due to gravitational pull. The main forms of precipitation include drizzle, rain, rain and snow mixed ("sleet" in Commonwealth usage), snow, ice pellets, graupel and hail. Precipitation occurs when cloud particles become heavy enough that atmospheric motions are insufficient to keep them aloft, such that they "precipitate" or fall. Thus, fog and mist are not precipitation; their water vapor does not condense sufficiently to precipitate, so fog and mist do not fall. (Such a non-precipitating combination is a colloid.) Two processes, possibly acting together, can lead to air becoming saturated with water vapor: cooling the air or adding water vapor to the air. Precipitation forms as smaller droplets coalesce via collision with other rain drops or ice crystals within a cloud. Short, intense periods of rain in scattered locations are called showers.

Moisture that is lifted or otherwise forced to rise over a layer of sub-freezing air at the surface may be condensed by the low temperature into clouds and rain. This process is typically active when freezing rain occurs. A stationary front is often present near the area of freezing rain and serves as the focus for forcing moist air to rise. Provided there is necessary and sufficient atmospheric moisture content, the moisture within the rising air will condense into clouds, namely nimbostratus and cumulonimbus if significant precipitation is involved. Eventually, the cloud droplets will grow large enough to form raindrops and descend toward the Earth where they will freeze on contact with exposed objects. Where relatively warm water bodies are present, for example due to water evaporation from lakes, lake-effect snowfall becomes a concern downwind of the warm lakes within the cold cyclonic flow around the backside of extratropical cyclones. Lake-effect snowfall can be locally heavy. Thundersnow is possible within a cyclone's comma head and within lake effect precipitation bands. In mountainous areas, heavy precipitation is possible where upslope flow is maximized within windward sides of the terrain at elevation. On the leeward side of mountains, desert climates can exist due to the dry air caused by compressional heating. Most precipitation occurs within the tropics and is caused by convection.

Precipitation is a major component of the water cycle, and is responsible for depositing most of the fresh water on the planet. Approximately 505,000 cubic kilometres (121,000 mi^{3}) of water falls as precipitation each year: 398,000 cubic kilometres (95,000 mi^{3}) over oceans and 107,000 cubic kilometres (26,000 mi^{3}) over land. Given the Earth's surface area, that means the globally averaged annual precipitation is 990 millimetres (39 in), but over land it is only 715 millimetres (28.1 in). Climate classification systems such as the Köppen climate classification system use average annual rainfall to help differentiate between differing climate regimes. Global warming is already causing changes to weather, increasing precipitation in some geographies, and reducing it in others, resulting in additional extreme weather.

Precipitation may occur on other celestial bodies. Saturn's largest satellite, Titan, hosts methane precipitation as a slow-falling drizzle, which has been observed as rain puddles at its equator and polar regions.

== Types ==
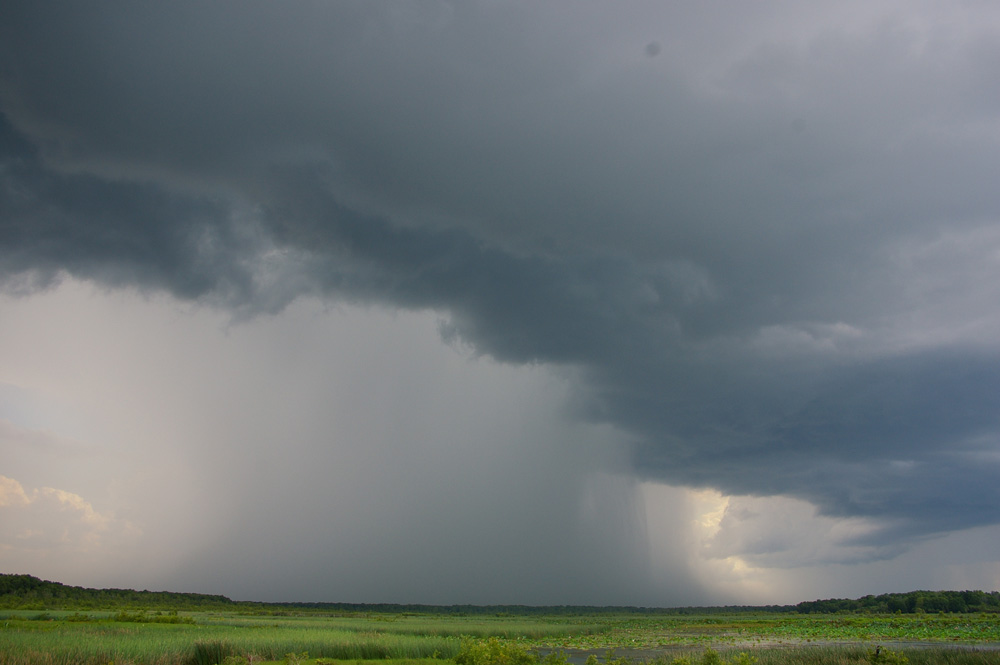
A thunderstorm with heavy rain shower

Mechanisms of producing precipitation include convective, stratiform, and orographic rainfall. Convective processes involve strong vertical motions that can cause the overturning of the atmosphere in that location within an hour and cause heavy precipitation, while stratiform processes involve weaker upward motions and less intense precipitation. Precipitation can be divided into three categories, based on whether it falls as liquid water, liquid water that freezes on contact with the surface, or ice. Mixtures of different types of precipitation, including types in different categories, can fall simultaneously. Liquid forms of precipitation include rain and drizzle. Rain or drizzle that freezes on contact within a subfreezing air mass is called "freezing rain" or "freezing drizzle". Frozen forms of precipitation include snow, ice needles, ice pellets, hail, and graupel.

=== Measurement ===
Liquid precipitation
Rainfall (including drizzle and rain) is usually measured using a rain gauge and expressed in units of millimeters (mm) of height or depth. Equivalently, it can be expressed as a physical quantity with dimension of volume of water per collection area, in units of liters per square meter (L/m^{2}); as 1L = 1dm^{3} = 1mm·m^{2}, the units of area (m^{2}) cancel out, resulting in simply "mm". This also corresponds to an area density expressed in kg/m^{2}, assuming that 1 liter of water has a mass of 1 kg (water density), which is acceptable for most practical purposes. The corresponding English unit used is usually inches. In Australia before metrication, rainfall was also measured in "points", each of which was defined as one-hundredth of an inch.

Solid precipitation
A snow gauge is usually used to measure the amount of solid precipitation. Snowfall is usually measured in centimeters by letting snow fall into a container and then measure the height. The snow can then optionally be melted to obtain a water equivalent measurement in millimeters like for liquid precipitation. The relationship between snow height and water equivalent depends on the water content of the snow; the water equivalent can thus only provide a rough estimate of snow depth. Other forms of solid precipitation, such as snow pellets and hail or even rain and snow mixed ("sleet" in Commonwealth usage), can also be melted and measured as their respective water equivalents, usually expressed in millimeters as for liquid precipitation.

== Air becomes saturated ==
=== Cooling air to its dew point ===
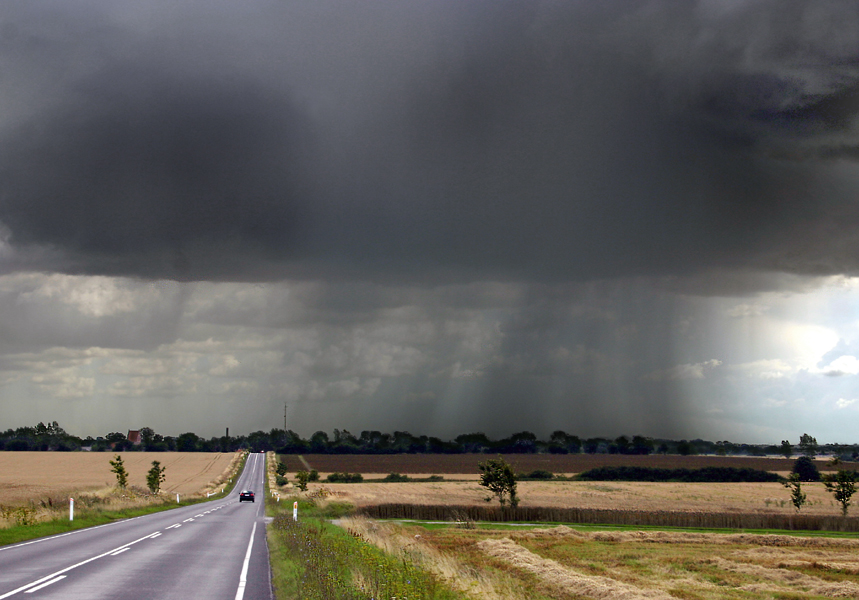
Late-summer rainstorm in Denmark

Lenticular cloud forming due to mountains over Wyoming

The dew point is the temperature to which a parcel of air must be cooled in order to become saturated, and (unless super-saturation occurs) condenses to water. Water vapor normally begins to condense on condensation nuclei such as dust, ice, and salt in order to form clouds. The cloud condensation nuclei concentration will determine the cloud microphysics. An elevated portion of a frontal zone forces broad areas of lift, which form cloud decks such as altostratus or cirrostratus. Stratus is a stable cloud deck which tends to form when a cool, stable air mass is trapped underneath a warm air mass. It can also form due to the lifting of advection fog during breezy conditions.

There are four main mechanisms for cooling the air to its dew point: adiabatic cooling, conductive cooling, radiational cooling, and evaporative cooling. Adiabatic cooling occurs when air rises and expands. The air can rise due to convection, large-scale atmospheric motions, or a physical barrier such as a mountain (orographic lift). Conductive cooling occurs when the air comes into contact with a colder surface, usually by being blown from one surface to another, for example from a liquid water surface to colder land. Radiational cooling occurs due to the emission of infrared radiation, either by the air or by the surface underneath. Evaporative cooling occurs when moisture is added to the air through evaporation, which forces the air temperature to cool to its wet-bulb temperature, or until it reaches saturation.

=== Adding moisture to the air ===
The main ways water vapor is added to the air are: wind convergence into areas of upward motion, precipitation or virga falling from above, daytime heating evaporating water from the surface of oceans, water bodies or wet land, transpiration from plants, cool or dry air moving over warmer water, and lifting air over mountains.

== Forms of precipitation ==
Condensation and coalescence are important parts of the water cycle.

=== Raindrops ===
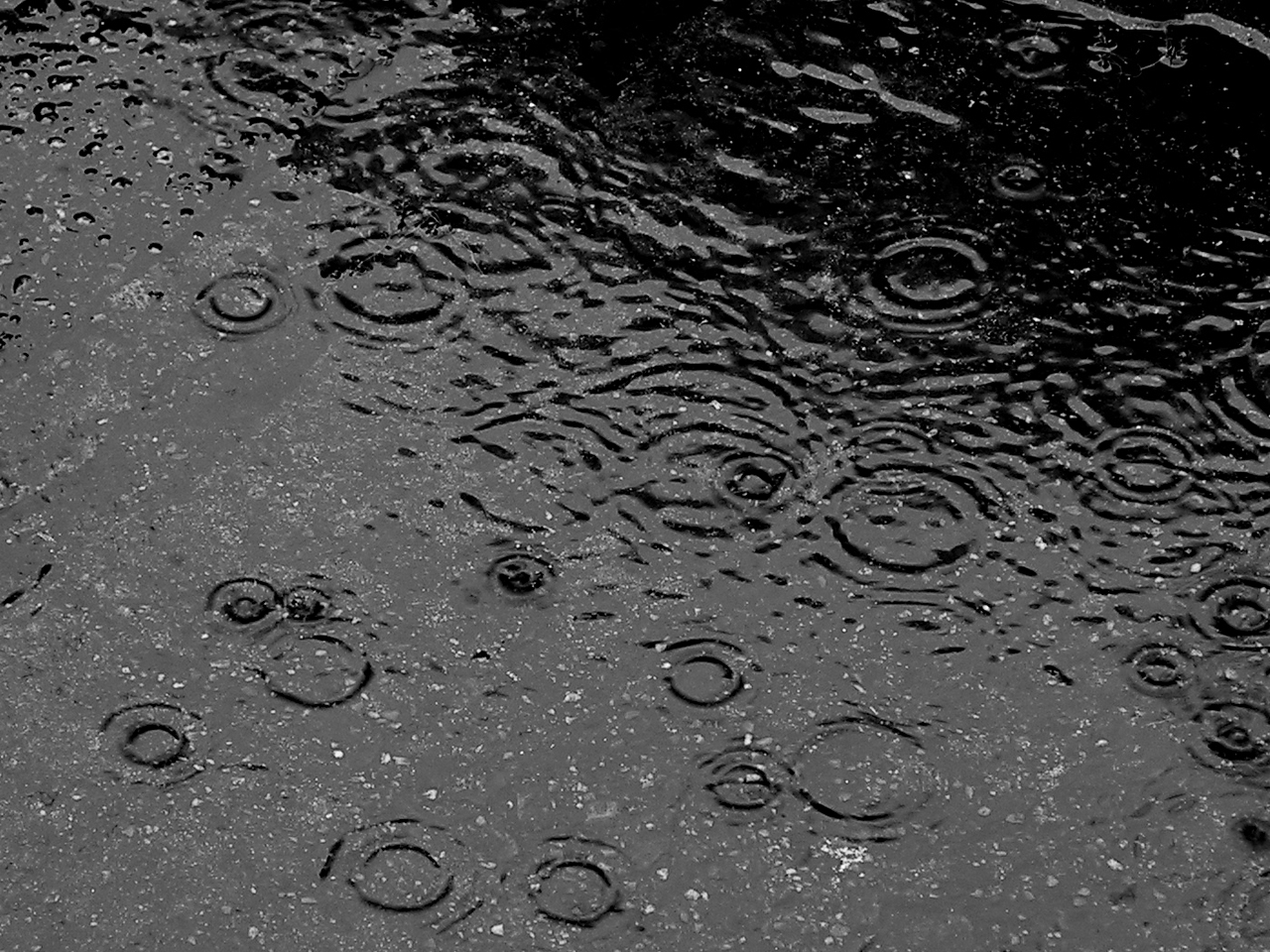
Puddle in the rain

Coalescence occurs when water droplets fuse to create larger water droplets, or when water droplets freeze onto an ice crystal, which is known as the Bergeron process. The fall rate of very small droplets is negligible, hence clouds do not fall out of the sky; precipitation will only occur when these coalesce into larger drops. Droplets with different sizes will have different terminal velocity that cause droplets collision and producing larger droplets. Turbulence will enhance the collision process. As these larger water droplets descend, coalescence continues, so that drops become heavy enough to overcome air resistance and fall as rain.

Raindrops have sizes ranging from 5.1 to 20 millimetres (0.20 to 0.79 in) mean diameter, above which they tend to break up. Smaller drops are called cloud droplets, and their shape is spherical. As a raindrop increases in size, its shape becomes more oblate, with its largest cross-section facing the oncoming airflow. Contrary to the cartoon pictures of raindrops, their shape does not resemble a teardrop. Intensity and duration of rainfall are usually inversely related, i.e., high intensity storms are likely to be of short duration and low intensity storms can have a long duration. Rain drops associated with melting hail tend to be larger than other rain drops. The METAR code for rain is RA, while the coding for rain showers is SHRA.

=== Ice pellets ===
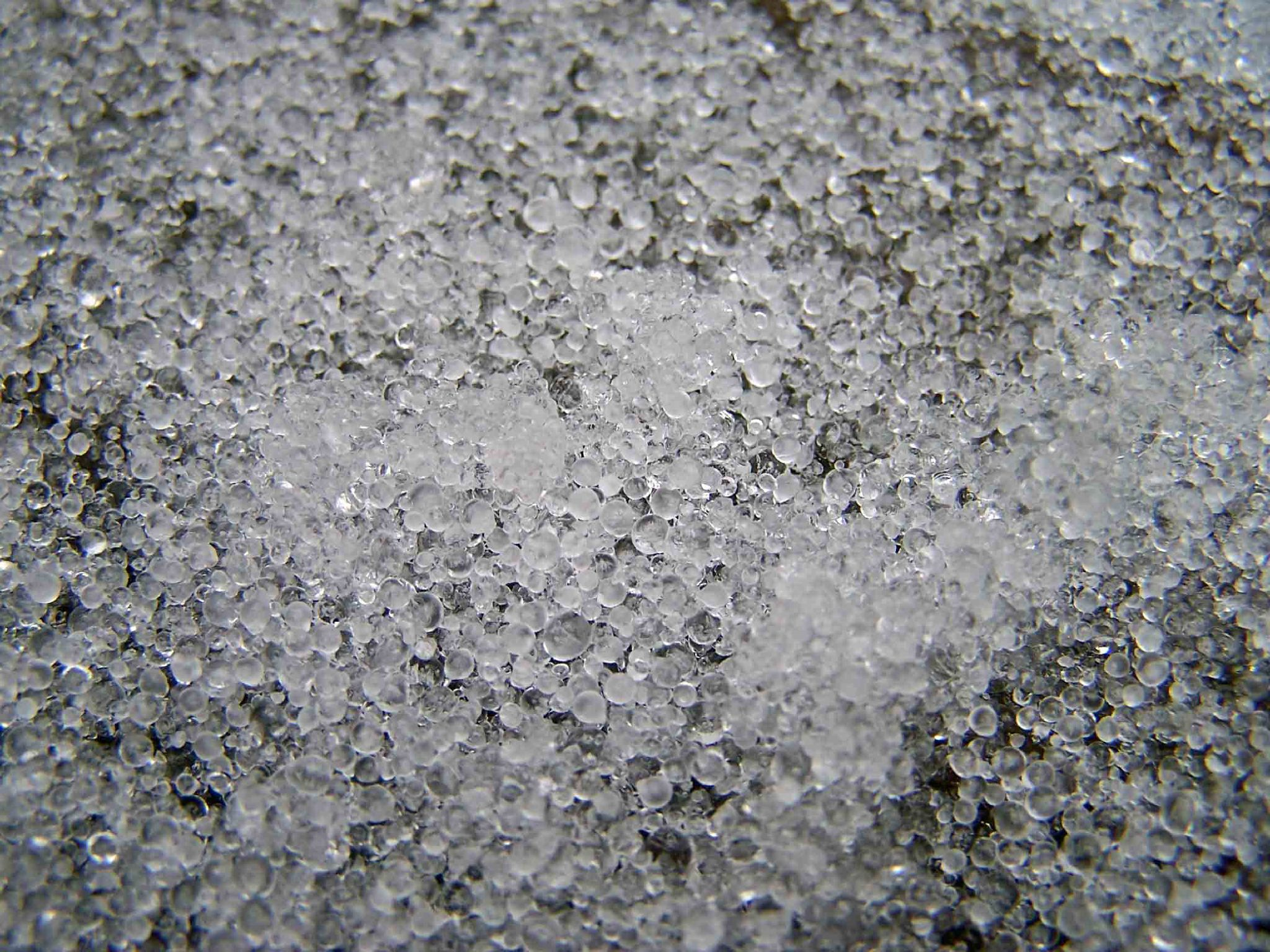
An accumulation of ice pellets

Ice pellets ("sleet" in US usage) are a form of precipitation consisting of small, translucent balls of ice. Ice pellets are usually (but not always) smaller than hailstones. They often bounce when they hit the ground, and generally do not freeze into a solid mass unless mixed with freezing rain. The METAR code for ice pellets is PL.

Ice pellets form when a layer of above-freezing air exists with sub-freezing air both above and below. This causes the partial or complete melting of any snowflakes falling through the warm layer. As they fall back into the sub-freezing layer closer to the surface, they re-freeze into ice pellets. However, if the sub-freezing layer beneath the warm layer is too small, the precipitation will not have time to re-freeze, and freezing rain will be the result at the surface. A temperature profile showing a warm layer above the ground is most likely to be found in advance of a warm front during the cold season.

=== Hail ===
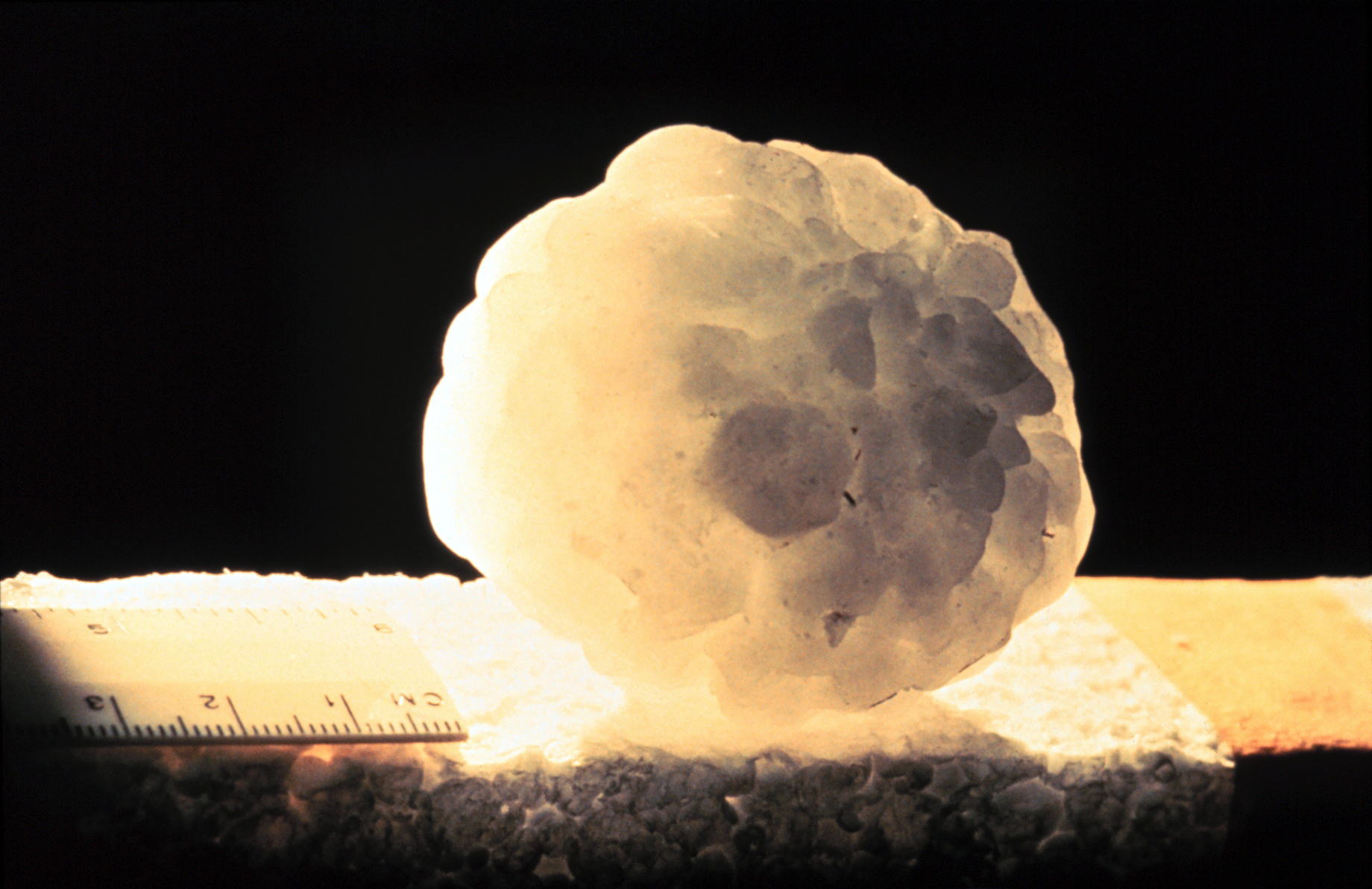
A large hailstone, about 6 centimetres (2.4 in) in diameter

Like other precipitation, hail forms in storm clouds when supercooled water droplets freeze on contact with condensation nuclei, such as dust or dirt. The storm's updraft blows the hailstones to the upper part of the cloud. The updraft dissipates and the hailstones fall down, back into the updraft, and are lifted again. Hail has a diameter of 5 millimetres (0.20 in) or more. Within METAR code, GR is used to indicate larger hail, of a diameter of at least 6.4 millimetres (0.25 in). GR is derived from the French word grêle. Smaller-sized hail, as well as snow pellets, use the coding of GS, which is short for the French word grésil. Stones just larger than golf ball-sized are one of the most frequently reported hail sizes. Hailstones can grow to 15 centimetres (6 in) and weigh more than 500 grams (1 lb). In large hailstones, latent heat released by further freezing may melt the outer shell of the hailstone. The hailstone then may undergo 'wet growth', where the liquid outer shell collects other smaller hailstones. The hailstone gains an ice layer and grows increasingly larger with each ascent. Once a hailstone becomes too heavy to be supported by the storm's updraft, it falls from the cloud.

=== Snowflakes ===
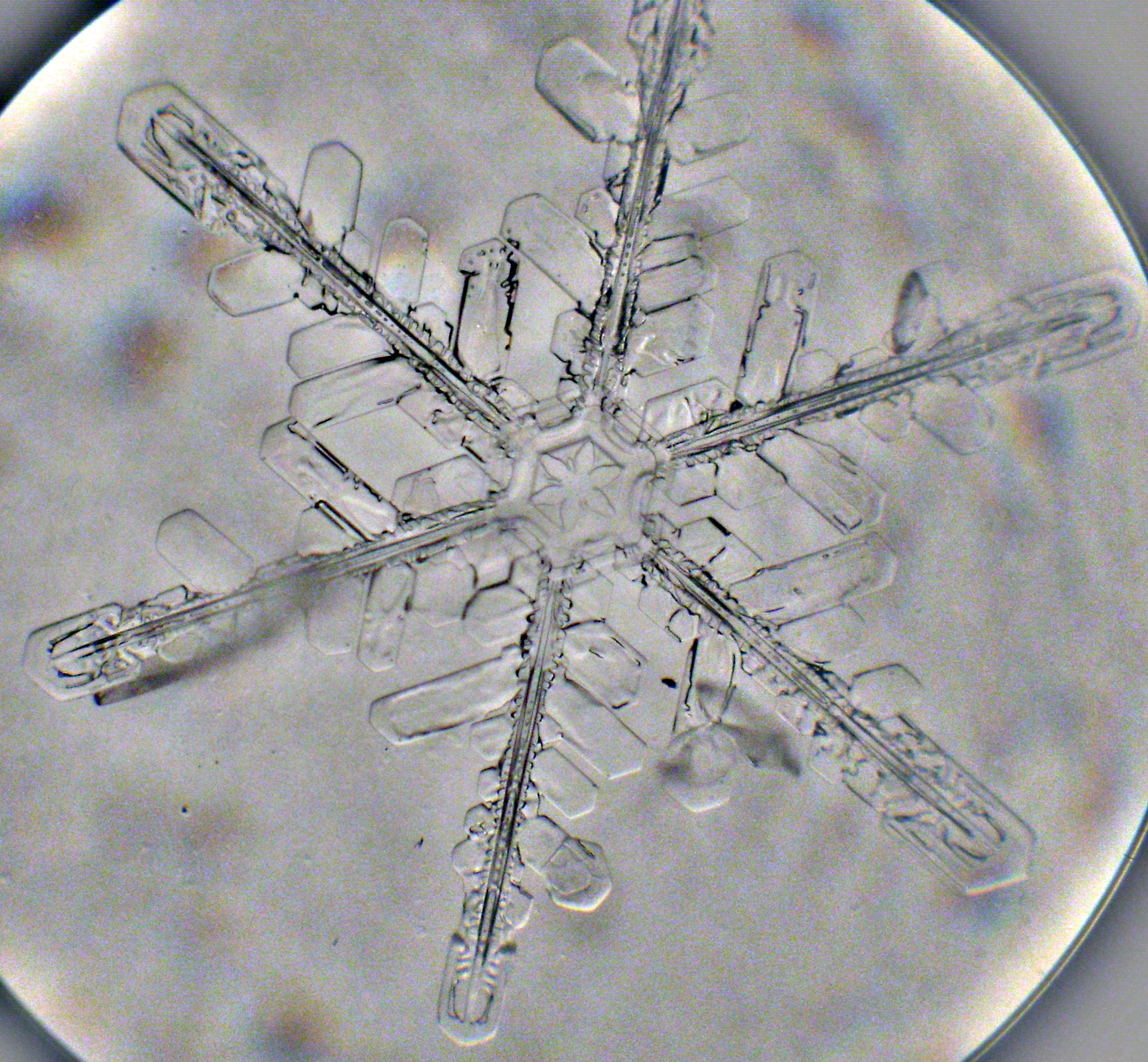
Snowflake viewed in an optical microscope

Snow crystals form when tiny supercooled cloud droplets (about 10 μm in diameter) freeze. Once a droplet has frozen, it grows in the supersaturated environment. Because water droplets are more numerous than the ice crystals the crystals are able to grow to hundreds of micrometers in size at the expense of the water droplets. This process is known as the Wegener–Bergeron–Findeisen process. The corresponding depletion of water vapor causes the droplets to evaporate, meaning that the ice crystals grow at the droplets' expense. These large crystals are an efficient source of precipitation, since they fall through the atmosphere due to their mass, and may collide and stick together in clusters, or aggregates. These aggregates are snowflakes, and are usually the type of ice particle that falls to the ground. Guinness World Records list the world's largest snowflakes as those of January 1887 at Fort Keogh, Montana; allegedly one measured 38 cm (15 in) wide.

Although the ice is clear, scattering of light by the crystal facets and hollows/imperfections mean that the crystals often appear white in color due to diffuse reflection of the whole spectrum of light by the small ice particles. The shape of the snowflake is determined broadly by the temperature and humidity at which it is formed. Rarely, at a temperature of around −2 °C (28 °F), snowflakes can form in threefold symmetry—triangular snowflakes. The most common snow particles are visibly irregular, although near-perfect snowflakes may be more common in pictures because they are more visually appealing. No two snowflakes are alike, as they grow at different rates and in different patterns depending on the changing temperature and humidity within the atmosphere through which they fall on their way to the ground. The METAR code for snow is SN, while snow showers are coded SHSN.

=== Diamond dust ===
Diamond dust, also known as ice needles or ice crystals, forms at temperatures approaching −40 °C (−40 °F) due to air with slightly higher moisture from aloft mixing with colder, surface-based air. They are made of simple ice crystals, hexagonal in shape. The METAR identifier for diamond dust within international hourly weather reports is IC.

=== Occult deposition ===
Occult deposition occurs when mist or air that is highly saturated with water vapour interacts with the leaves of trees or shrubs it passes over.

== Causes ==
=== Frontal activity ===
Stratiform or dynamic precipitation occurs as a consequence of slow ascent of air in synoptic systems (on the order of cm/s), such as over surface cold fronts, and over and ahead of warm fronts. Similar ascent is seen around tropical cyclones outside of the eyewall, and in comma-head precipitation patterns around mid-latitude cyclones. A wide variety of weather can be found along an occluded front, with thunderstorms possible, but usually their passage is associated with a drying of the air mass. Occluded fronts usually form around mature low-pressure areas. Precipitation may occur on celestial bodies other than Earth. When it gets cold, Mars has precipitation that most likely takes the form of ice needles, rather than rain or snow.

=== Convection ===
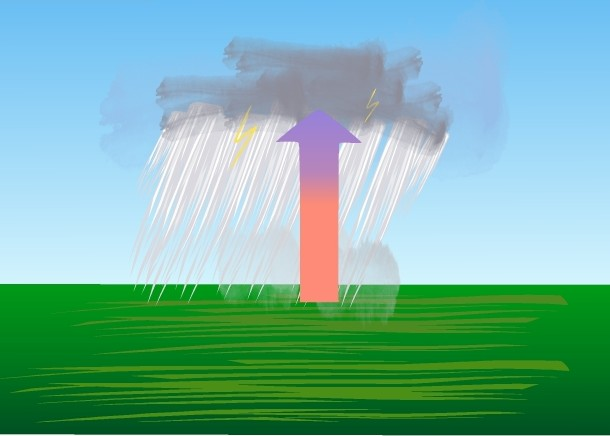
Convective precipitation

Convective rain, or showery precipitation, occurs from convective clouds, e.g. cumulonimbus or cumulus congestus. It falls as showers with rapidly changing intensity. Convective precipitation falls over a certain area for a relatively short time, as convective clouds have limited horizontal extent. Most precipitation in the tropics appears to be convective; however, it has been suggested that stratiform precipitation also occurs. Graupel and hail indicate convection. In mid-latitudes, convective precipitation is intermittent and often associated with baroclinic boundaries such as cold fronts, squall lines, and warm fronts.

=== Orographic effects ===
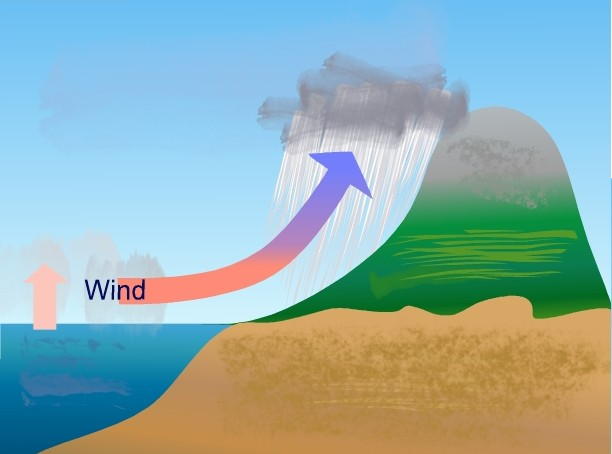
Orographic precipitation

Orographic precipitation occurs on the windward (upwind) side of mountains and is caused by the rising air motion of a large-scale flow of moist air across the mountain ridge, resulting in adiabatic cooling and condensation. In mountainous parts of the world subjected to relatively consistent winds (for example, the trade winds), a more moist climate usually prevails on the windward side of a mountain than on the leeward or downwind side. Moisture is removed by orographic lift, leaving drier air (see katabatic wind) on the descending and generally warming, leeward side where a rain shadow is observed.

In Hawaii, Mount Waiʻaleʻale, on the island of Kauai, is notable for its extreme rainfall, as it has the second-highest average annual rainfall on Earth, with 12,000 millimetres (460 in). Storm systems affect the state with heavy rains between October and March. Local climates vary considerably on each island due to their topography, divisible into windward (Koʻolau) and leeward (Kona) regions based upon location relative to the higher mountains. Windward sides face the east to northeast trade winds and receive much more rainfall; leeward sides are drier and sunnier, with less rain and less cloud cover.

In South America, the Andes mountain range blocks Pacific moisture that arrives in that continent, resulting in a desertlike climate just downwind across western Argentina. The Sierra Nevada range creates the same effect in North America forming the Great Basin and Mojave Deserts.

=== Snow ===
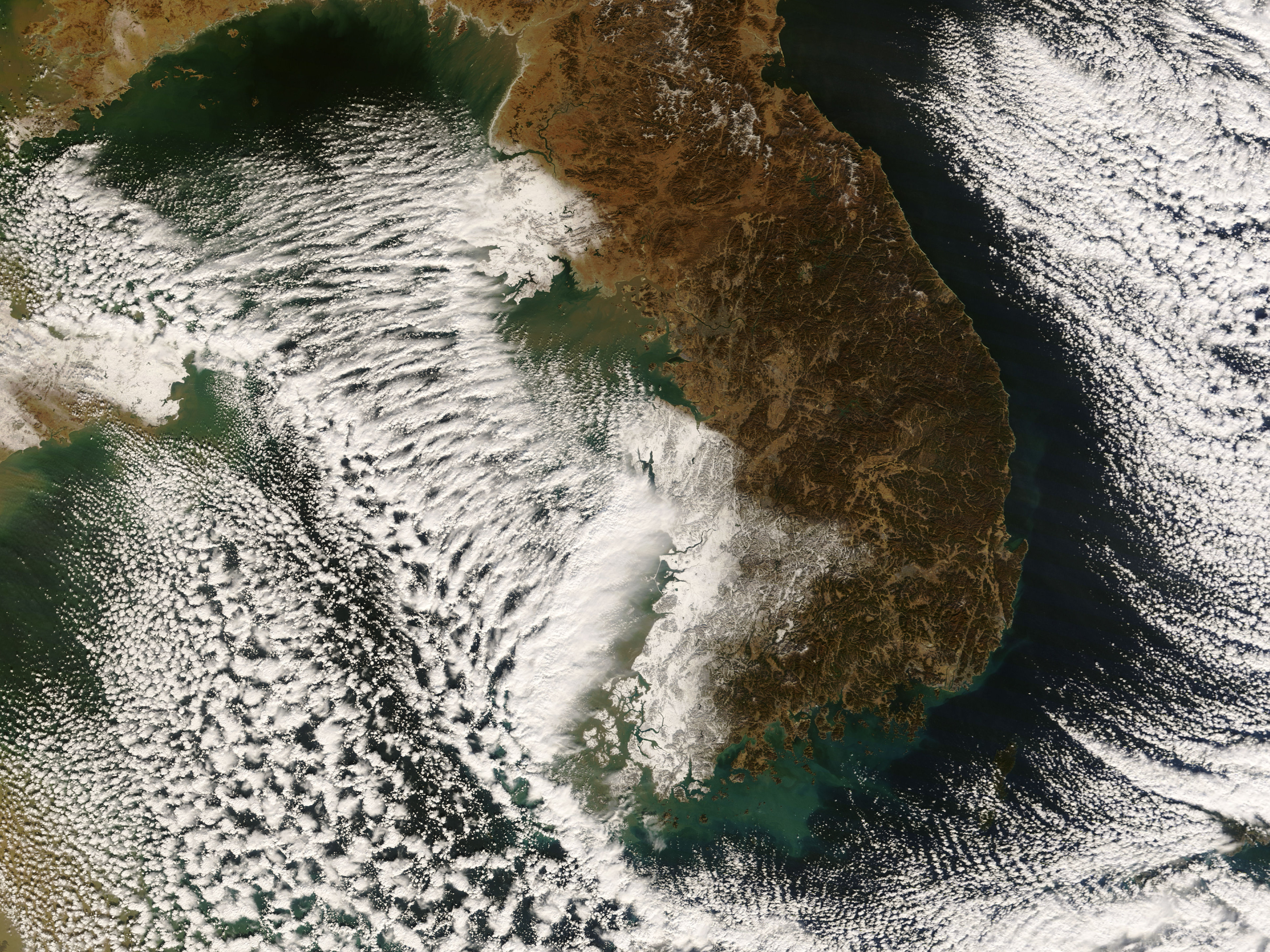
Lake-effect snow bands near the Korean Peninsula in early December 2008

Extratropical cyclones can bring cold and dangerous conditions with heavy rain and snow with winds exceeding 119 km/h (74 mph), (sometimes referred to as windstorms in Europe). The band of precipitation that is associated with their warm front is often extensive, forced by weak upward vertical motion of air over the frontal boundary which condenses as it cools and produces precipitation within an elongated band, which is wide and stratiform, meaning falling out of nimbostratus clouds.

Southwest of extratropical cyclones, curved cyclonic flow bringing cold air across the relatively warm water bodies can lead to narrow lake-effect snow bands. Those bands bring strong localized snowfall which can be understood as follows: Large water bodies such as lakes efficiently store heat that results in significant temperature differences (larger than 13 °C or 23 °F) between the water surface and the air above. Because of this temperature difference, warmth and moisture are transported upward, condensing into vertically oriented clouds (see satellite picture) which produce snow showers. The temperature decrease with height and cloud depth are directly affected by both the water temperature and the large-scale environment. The stronger the temperature decrease with height, the deeper the clouds get, and the greater the precipitation rate becomes.

In mountainous areas, heavy snowfall accumulates when air is forced to ascend the mountains and squeeze out precipitation along their windward slopes, which in cold conditions, falls in the form of snow. Because of the ruggedness of terrain, forecasting the location of heavy snowfall remains a significant challenge.

=== Within the tropics ===
Rainfall distribution by month in Cairns showing the extent of the wet season at that location

The wet, or rainy, season is the time of year, covering one or more months, when most of the average annual rainfall in a region falls. The term green season is also sometimes used as a euphemism by tourist authorities. Areas with wet seasons are dispersed across portions of the tropics and subtropics. Savanna climates and areas with monsoon regimes have wet summers and dry winters. Tropical rainforests technically do not have dry or wet seasons, since their rainfall is equally distributed through the year. Some areas with pronounced rainy seasons will see a break in rainfall mid-season when the Intertropical Convergence Zone or monsoon trough move poleward of their location during the middle of the warm season. When the wet season occurs during the warm season, or summer, rain falls mainly during the late afternoon and early evening hours. The wet season is a time when air quality improves, freshwater quality improves, and vegetation grows significantly. Soil nutrients diminish and erosion increases. Animals have adaptation and survival strategies for the wetter regime. The previous dry season leads to food shortages into the wet season, as the crops have yet to mature. Developing countries have noted that their populations show seasonal weight fluctuations due to food shortages seen before the first harvest, which occurs late in the wet season.

Tropical cyclones, a source of very heavy rainfall, consist of large air masses several hundred miles across with low pressure at the centre and with winds blowing inward towards the centre in either a clockwise direction (southern hemisphere) or counterclockwise (northern hemisphere). Although cyclones can take an enormous toll in lives and personal property, they may be important factors in the precipitation regimes of places they impact, as they may bring much-needed precipitation to otherwise dry regions. Areas in their path can receive a year's worth of rainfall from a tropical cyclone passage.

=== Large-scale geographical distribution ===
On the large scale, the highest precipitation amounts outside topography fall in the tropics, closely tied to the Intertropical Convergence Zone, itself the ascending branch of the Hadley cell. Mountainous locales near the equator in Colombia are amongst the wettest places on Earth. North and south of this are regions of descending air that form subtropical ridges where precipitation is low; the land surface underneath these ridges is usually arid, and these regions make up most of the Earth's deserts. An exception to this rule is in Hawaii, where upslope flow due to the trade winds lead to one of the wettest locations on Earth.

== Measurement ==
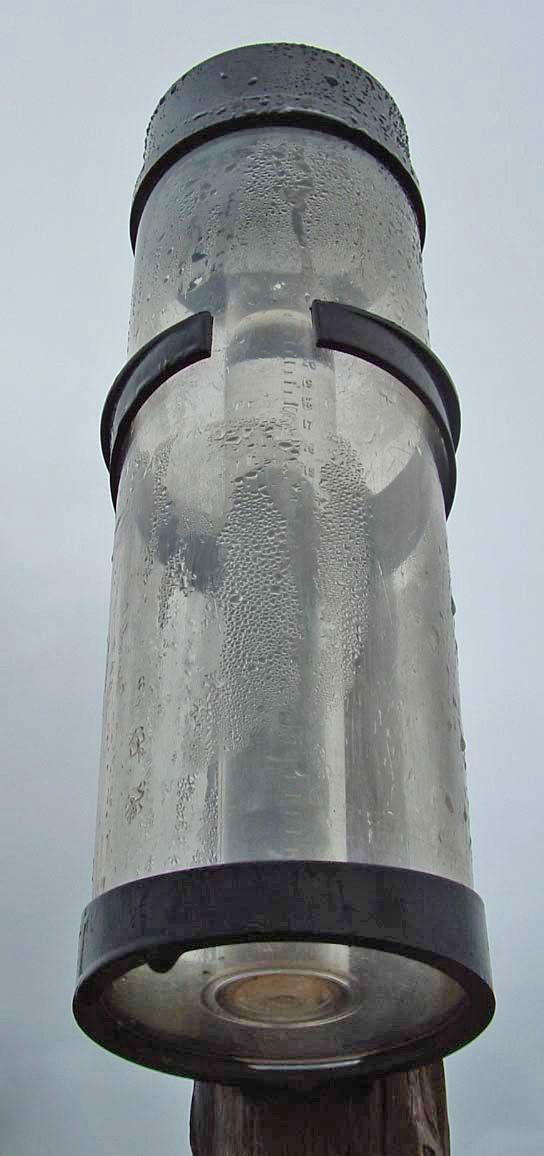
Standard rain gauge

The standard way of measuring rainfall or snowfall is the standard rain gauge, which can be found in 10 cm (3.9 in) plastic and 20 cm (7.9 in) metal varieties. The inner cylinder is filled by 2.5 cm (0.98 in) of rain, with overflow flowing into the outer cylinder. Plastic gauges have markings on the inner cylinder down to 1/4 mm (0.0098 in) resolution, while metal gauges require use of a stick designed with the appropriate 1/4 mm (0.0098 in) markings. After the inner cylinder is filled, the amount inside is discarded, then filled with the remaining rainfall in the outer cylinder until all the fluid in the outer cylinder is gone, adding to the overall total until the outer cylinder is empty. These gauges are used in the winter by removing the funnel and inner cylinder and allowing snow and freezing rain to collect inside the outer cylinder. Some add anti-freeze to their gauge so they do not have to melt the snow or ice that falls into the gauge. Once the snowfall/ice is finished accumulating, or as 30 cm (12 in) is approached, one can either bring it inside to melt, or use lukewarm water to fill the inner cylinder with in order to melt the frozen precipitation in the outer cylinder, keeping track of the warm fluid added, which is subsequently subtracted from the overall total once all the ice/snow is melted.

When a precipitation measurement is made, various networks exist across the United States and elsewhere where rainfall measurements can be submitted through the Internet, such as CoCoRAHS or GLOBE. If a network is not available in the area where one lives, the nearest local weather office will likely be interested in the measurement.

=== Hydrometeor definition ===
A concept used in precipitation measurement is the hydrometeor. Any particulates of liquid or solid water in the atmosphere are known as hydrometeors. Formations due to condensation, such as clouds, haze, fog, and mist, are composed of hydrometeors. All precipitation types are made up of hydrometeors by definition, including virga, which is precipitation which evaporates before reaching the ground. Particles blown from the Earth's surface by wind, such as blowing snow and blowing sea spray, are also hydrometeors, as are hail and snow.

=== Satellite estimates ===
Although surface precipitation gauges are considered the standard for measuring precipitation, there are many areas in which their use is not feasible. This includes the vast expanses of ocean and remote land areas. In other cases, social, technical or administrative issues prevent the dissemination of gauge observations. As a result, the modern global record of precipitation largely depends on satellite observations.

Satellite sensors now in practical use for precipitation fall into two categories. Thermal infrared (IR) sensors record a channel around 11 micron wavelength and primarily give information about cloud tops. Due to the typical structure of the atmosphere, cloud-top temperatures are approximately inversely related to cloud-top heights, meaning colder clouds almost always occur at higher altitudes. Further, cloud tops with a lot of small-scale variation are likely to be more vigorous than smooth-topped clouds. Various mathematical schemes, or algorithms, use these and other properties to estimate precipitation from the IR data.

Additional sensor channels and products have been demonstrated to provide additional useful information including visible channels, additional IR channels, water vapor channels and atmospheric sounding retrievals. However, most precipitation data sets in current use do not employ these data sources.

== Return period ==
The likelihood or probability of an event with a specified intensity and duration is called the return period or frequency. The intensity of a storm can be predicted for any return period and storm duration, from charts based on historical data for the location. The term 1 in 10 year storm describes a rainfall event which is rare and is only likely to occur once every 10 years, so it has a 10 percent likelihood any given year. The rainfall will be greater and the flooding will be worse than the worst storm expected in any single year. The term 1 in 100 year storm describes a rainfall event which is extremely rare and which will occur with a likelihood of only once in a century, so has a 1 percent likelihood in any given year. The rainfall will be extreme and flooding to be worse than a 1 in 10 year event. As with all probability events, it is possible though unlikely to have two "1 in 100 Year Storms" in a single year.

== Uneven pattern of precipitation ==
A significant portion of the annual precipitation in any particular place (no weather station in Africa or South America were considered) falls on only a few days, typically about 50% during the 12 days with the most precipitation.

== Role in Köppen climate classification ==
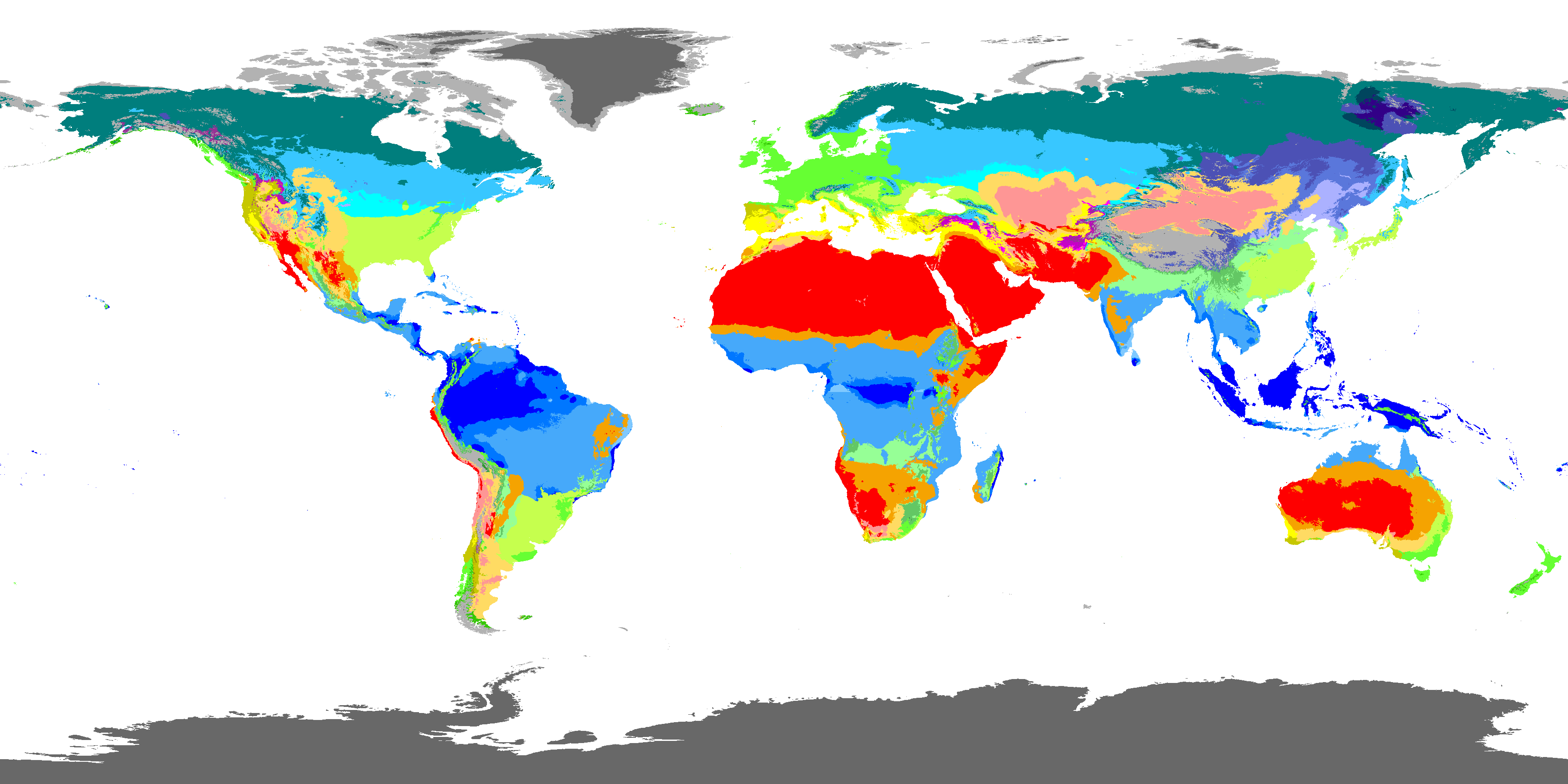
Updated Köppen–Geiger climate map: Af Am Aw/As / BWh BWk BSh BSk / Csa Csb Csc / Cwa Cwb Cwc / Cfa Cfb Cfc / Dsa Dsb Dsc Dsd / Dwa Dwb Dwc Dwd / Dfa Dfb Dfc Dfd / ET EF

Rain forests are characterized by high rainfall, with definitions setting minimum normal annual rainfall between 1,750 and 2,000 mm (69 and 79 in). A tropical savanna is a grassland biome located in semi-arid to semi-humid climate regions of subtropical and tropical latitudes, with rainfall between 750 and 1,270 mm (30 and 50 in) a year. They are widespread on Africa, and are also found in India, the northern parts of South America, Malaysia, and Australia. The humid subtropical climate zone is where winter rainfall (and sometimes snowfall) is associated with large storms that the westerlies steer from west to east. Most summer rainfall occurs during thunderstorms and from occasional tropical cyclones. Humid subtropical climates lie on the east side continents, roughly between latitudes 20° and 40° degrees from the equator.

An oceanic (or maritime) climate is typically found along the west coasts at the middle latitudes of all the world's continents, bordering cool oceans, as well as southeastern Australia, and is accompanied by plentiful precipitation year-round. The Mediterranean climate regime resembles the climate of the lands in the Mediterranean Basin, parts of western North America, parts of western and southern Australia, in southwestern South Africa and in parts of central Chile. The climate is characterized by hot, dry summers and cool, wet winters. A steppe is a dry grassland. Subarctic climates are cold with continuous permafrost and little precipitation.

== Effect on agriculture ==
Rainfall estimates for southern Japan and the surrounding region from July 20 to 27, 2009.

Precipitation, especially rain, has a dramatic effect on agriculture. All plants need at least some water to survive, therefore rain (being the most effective means of watering) is important to agriculture. While a regular rain pattern is usually vital to healthy plants, too much or too little rainfall can be harmful, even devastating to crops. Drought can kill crops and increase erosion, while overly wet weather can cause harmful fungus growth. Plants need varying amounts of rainfall to survive. For example, cacti require only small amounts of water.

In areas with wet and dry seasons, soil nutrients diminish and erosion increases during the wet season. Animals have adaptation and survival strategies for the wetter regime. The previous dry season leads to food shortages into the wet season, as the crops have yet to mature. Developing countries have noted that their populations show seasonal weight fluctuations due to food shortages seen before the first harvest, which occurs late in the wet season.

== Climate change ==
Extreme precipitation events have become more common in the U.S. over recent decades.

Increasing temperatures tend to increase evaporation which leads to more precipitation. Precipitation has generally increased over land north of 30°N from 1900 to 2005 but has declined over the tropics since the 1970s. Globally there has been no statistically significant overall trend in precipitation over the past century, although trends have varied widely by region and over time. In 2018, a study assessing changes in precipitation across spatial scales using a high-resolution global precipitation dataset of over 33+ years, concluded that "While there are regional trends, there is no evidence of increase in precipitation at the global scale in response to the observed global warming."

Each region of the world is going to have changes in precipitation due to their unique conditions. Eastern portions of North and South America, northern Europe, and northern and central Asia have become wetter. The Sahel, the Mediterranean, southern Africa and parts of southern Asia have become drier. There has been an increase in the number of heavy precipitation events over many areas during the past century, as well as an increase since the 1970s in the prevalence of droughts—especially in the tropics and subtropics. Changes in precipitation and evaporation over the oceans are suggested by the decreased salinity of mid- and high-latitude waters (implying more precipitation), along with increased salinity in lower latitudes (implying less precipitation, more evaporation, or both). Over the contiguous United States, total annual precipitation increased at an average rate of 6.1% per century since 1900, with the greatest increases within the East North Central climate region (11.6% per century) and the South (11.1%). Hawaii was the only region to show a decrease (−9.25%).

== Changes due to urban heat island ==
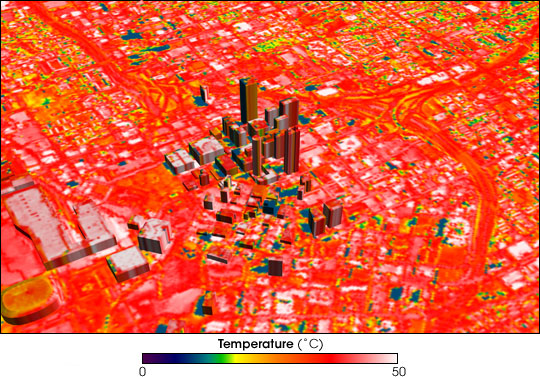
Image of Atlanta, Georgia, showing temperature distribution, with hot areas appearing white

The urban heat island warms cities 0.6 to 5.6 °C (1.1 to 10.1 °F) above surrounding suburbs and rural areas. This extra heat leads to greater upward motion, which can induce additional shower and thunderstorm activity. Rainfall rates downwind of cities are increased between 48% and 116%. Partly as a result of this warming, monthly rainfall is about 28% greater between 32 and 64 kilometres (20 and 40 mi) downwind of cities, compared with upwind. Some cities induce a total precipitation increase of 51%.

== Forecasting ==
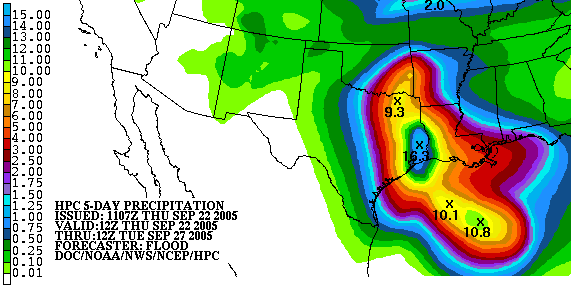
Example of a five-day rainfall forecast from the Hydrometeorological Prediction Center

The Quantitative Precipitation Forecast (abbreviated QPF) is the expected amount of liquid precipitation accumulated over a specified time over a specified area. A QPF will be specified when a measurable precipitation type reaching a minimum threshold is forecast for any hour during a QPF valid period. Precipitation forecasts tend to be bound by synoptic hours such as 0000, 0600, 1200, and 1800 GMT. The terrain is considered in QPFs using topography or based upon climatological precipitation patterns from observations with fine detail. Starting in the mid to late 1990s, QPFs were used within hydrologic forecast models to simulate impact to rivers throughout the United States. Forecast models show significant sensitivity to humidity levels within the planetary boundary layer, or in the lowest levels of the atmosphere, which decreases with height. QPF can be generated on a quantitative, forecasting amounts, or a qualitative, forecasting the probability of a specific amount, basis. Radar imagery forecasting techniques show higher skill than model forecasts within six to seven hours of the time of the radar image. The forecasts can be verified through the use of rain gauge measurements, weather radar estimates, or a combination of both. Various skill scores can be determined to measure the value of the rainfall forecast.

== See also ==
- List of meteorology topics
- Basic precipitation
- Bioprecipitation, the concept of rain-making bacteria.
- Mango showers, pre-monsoon showers in the Indian states of Karnataka and Kerala that help in the ripening of mangoes.
- Sunshower, an unusual meteorological phenomenon in which rain falls while the sun is shining.
- Wintry showers, an informal meteorological term for various mixtures of rain, freezing rain, ice pellets, and snow.
