= Ice nucleus =

Particle helping to form an ice crystal

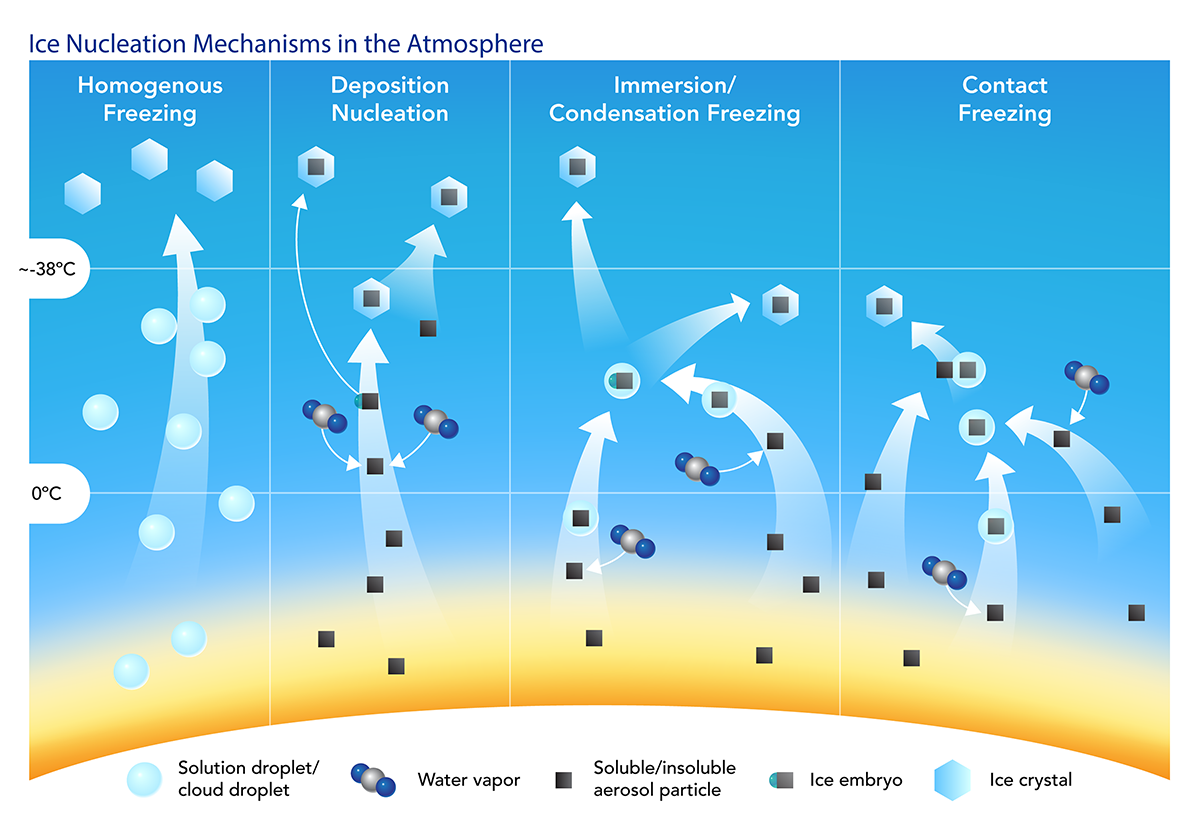
Ice nucleation mechanisms describe four modes that are responsible for the formation of primary ice crystals in the atmosphere.

An ice nucleus, also known as an ice nucleating particle (INP), is a particle which acts as the nucleus for the formation of an ice crystal in the atmosphere.

== Ice nucleation mechanisms ==
There are a number of mechanisms of ice nucleation in the atmosphere through which ice nuclei can catalyse the formation of ice particles. In the upper troposphere, water vapor can deposit directly onto solid particles. In clouds warmer than about −37 °C where liquid water can persist in a supercooled state, ice nuclei can trigger droplets to freeze.

Contact nucleation can occur if an ice nucleus collides with a supercooled droplet, but the more important mechanism of freezing is when an ice nucleus becomes immersed in a supercooled water droplet and then triggers freezing.

In the absence of an ice nucleating particle, pure water droplets can persist in a supercooled state to temperatures approaching −37 °C where they freeze homogeneously.

There are several research groups that study ice nucleating properties of atmospheric aerosols (for example see FIN-02 research article by DeMott et al. 2018 or the FIN-02 INP measurement intercomparison study). The ice nucleation research capability is also available through user facility call at EMSL, PNNL.

== Cloud dynamics ==
Ice particles can have a significant effect on cloud dynamics. They are known to be important in the processes by which clouds can become electrified, which causes lightning. They are also known to be able to form the seeds for rain droplets. It has become clear that the concentration of ice nucleating particles in shallow clouds is a key factor in cloud-climate feedbacks.

== Atmospheric particulate matter ==
Many different types of atmospheric particulate matter can act as ice nuclei, both natural and anthropogenic, including those composed of desert dust, soot, organic matter, bacteria (e.g. Pseudomonas syringae), pollen, fungal spores and volcanic ash amongst others. However, the exact nucleation potential of each type varies greatly, depending on the exact atmospheric conditions. Very little is known about the spatial distribution of these particles, their overall importance for global climate through ice cloud formation, and whether human activity has played a major role in changing these effects.

== See also ==
- Bergeron process
- Cloud condensation nuclei
- Nucleation
- Snow
- Supercooling
