= Cloud condensation nuclei =

Small particles on which water vapor condenses

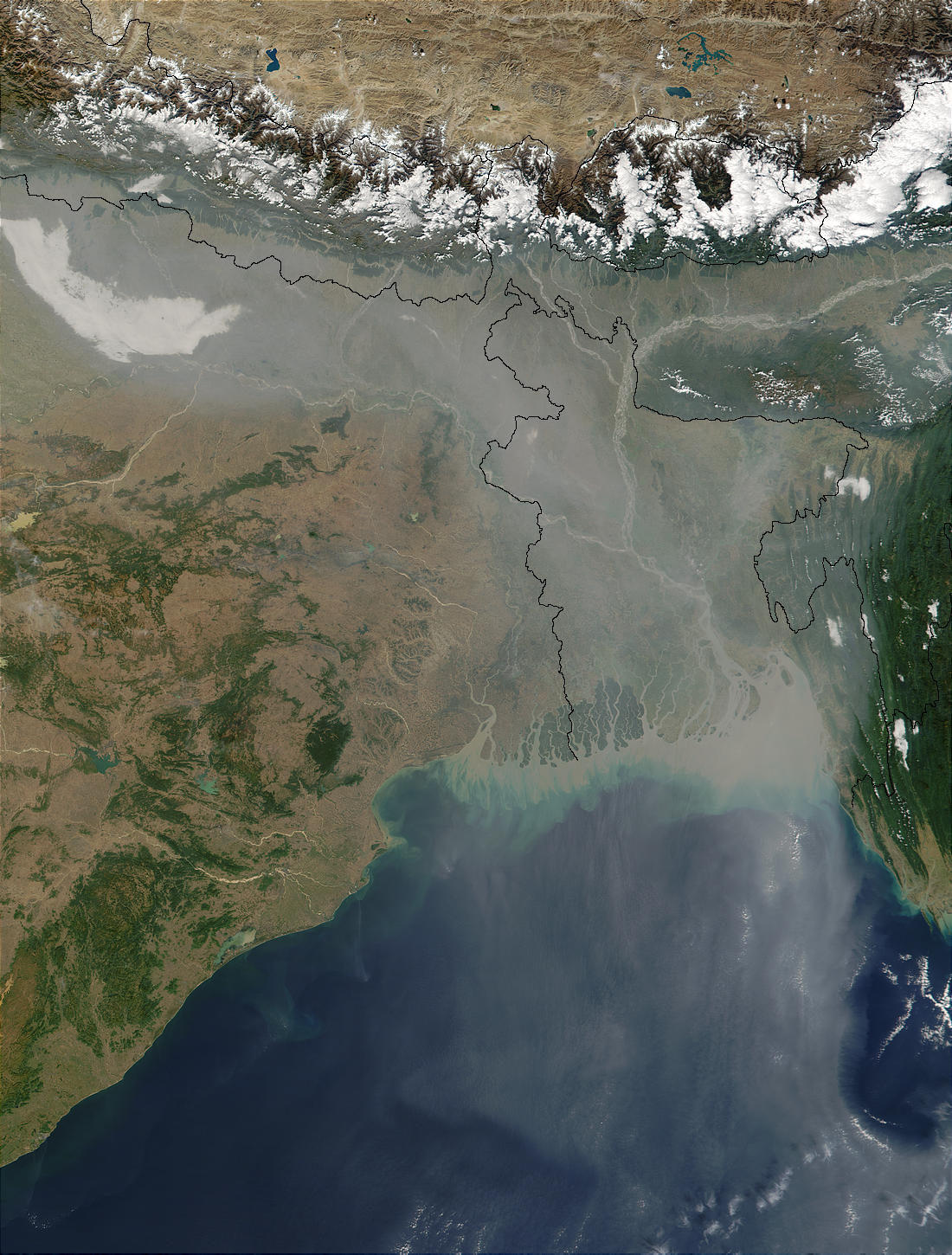
Aerosol pollution over northern India and Bangladesh (Satellite image by NASA)

Cloud condensation nuclei (CCNs), also known as cloud seeds, are small particles typically 0.2 μm, or one hundredth the size of a cloud droplet. CCNs are a unique subset of aerosols in the atmosphere on which water vapour condenses. This can affect the radiative properties of clouds and the overall atmosphere. Water vapour requires a non-gaseous surface to make the transition to a liquid; this process is called condensation.

In the atmosphere of Earth, this surface presents itself as tiny solid or liquid particles called CCNs. When no CCNs are present, water vapour can be supercooled at about −13 °C (9 °F) for 5–6 hours before droplets spontaneously form. This is the basis of the cloud chamber for detecting subatomic particles.

The concept of CCN (must associate to a supersaturation ratio) is used in cloud seeding, which tries to encourage rainfall by seeding the air with condensation nuclei (CN, which does not associate to supersaturation ratio). It has further been suggested that creating such nuclei could be used for marine cloud brightening, a climate engineering technique. Some natural environmental phenomena, such as the one proposed in the CLAW hypothesis also arise from the interaction between naturally produced CCNs and cloud formation.

== Properties ==
=== Size ===
A typical raindrop is about 2 mm in diameter, a typical cloud droplet is on the order of 0.02 mm, and a typical cloud condensation nucleus (aerosol) is on the order of 0.0001 mm or 0.1 μm or greater in diameter. The number of cloud condensation nuclei in the air can be measured at ranges between around 100 to 1000 per cm^{3}. The size distribution and chemical composition of CCNs over oceans usually have obvious differences compared to those over land. The total mass of CCNs injected into the atmosphere has been estimated at 2×10^{12} kg over a year's time.

=== Composition ===
There are many different types of atmospheric particulates that can act as CCN. The particles may be composed of dust or clay, soot or black carbon from grassland or forest fires, sea salt from ocean wave spray, soot from factory smokestacks or internal combustion engines, sulfate from volcanic activity, phytoplankton or the oxidation of sulfur dioxide and secondary organic matter formed by the oxidation of volatile organic compounds. The ability of these different types of particles to form cloud droplets varies according to their size and also their exact composition, as the hygroscopic properties of these different constituents are very different. Sulfate and sea salt, for instance, readily absorb water whereas soot, organic carbon, and mineral particles do not. This is made even more complicated by the fact that many of the chemical species may be mixed within the particles (in particular the sulfate and organic carbon). Additionally, while some particles (such as soot and minerals) do not make very good CCN, they do act as ice nuclei in colder parts of the atmosphere.

=== Abundance ===
The number and type of CCNs can affect the precipitation amount, lifetimes, and radiative properties of clouds. Ultimately, this has an influence on climate change. Modeling research led by Marcia Baker revealed that sources and sinks are balanced by coagulation and coalescence which leads to stable levels of CCNs in the atmosphere. There is also speculation that solar variation may affect cloud properties via CCNs, and hence affect climate.

=== Airborne measurements ===
The airborne measurements of these individual mixed aerosols can form CCN at a Southern Great Plains (SGP) site when performed using a research aircraft.

== Applications ==
=== Cloud seeding ===
Cloud seeding is a process by which small particulates are added to the atmosphere to induce cloud formation and precipitation. This has been done by dispersing salts using aerial or ground-based methods. Other methods have been researched, like using laser pulses to excite molecules in the atmosphere, and more recently, in 2021, electric charge emission using drones. The effectiveness of these methods is not consistent. Many studies did not notice a statistically significant difference in precipitation while others have. Cloud seeding may also occur from natural processes such as forest fires, which release small particles into the atmosphere that can act as nuclei.

=== Marine cloud brightening ===
Marine cloud brightening is a climate engineering technique which involves the injection of small particles into clouds to enhance their reflectivity, or albedo. The motive behind this technique is to control the amount of sunlight allowed to reach ocean surfaces in hopes of lowering surface temperatures through radiative forcing. Many methods involve the creation of small droplets of seawater to deliver sea salt particles into overlying clouds.

Complications may arise when reactive chlorine and bromine from sea salt react with existing molecules in the atmosphere. They have been shown to reduce ozone in the atmosphere; the same effect reduces hydroxide which correlates to the increased longevity of methane, a greenhouse gas.

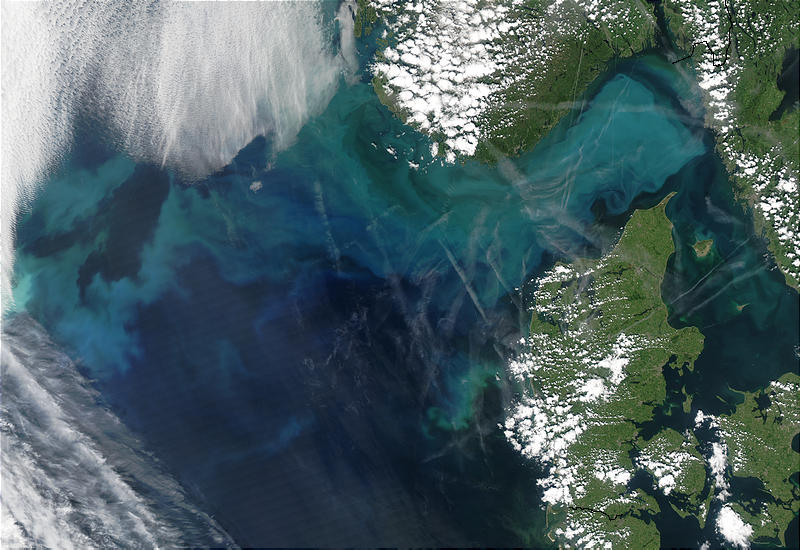
Phytoplankton bloom in the North Sea and the Skagerrak – NASA

== Relation with phytoplankton and climate ==
A 1987 article in Nature found that global climate may occur in a feedback loop due to the relationship between CCNs, the temperature regulating behaviors of clouds, and oceanic phytoplankton. This phenomenon has since been referred to as the CLAW hypothesis, after the authors of the original study. A common CCN over oceans is sulphate aerosols. These aerosols are formed from the dimethyl sulfide (DMS) produced by algae found in seawater. Large algal blooms, observed to have increased in areas such as the South China Sea, can contribute a substantial amount of DMS into their surrounding atmospheres, leading to increased cloud formation. As the activity of phytoplankton is temperature reliant, this negative-feedback loop can act as a form of climate regulation. The Revenge of Gaia, written by James Lovelock, an author of the 1987 study, proposes an alternative relationship between ocean temperatures and phytoplankton population size. This has been named the anti-CLAW hypothesis In this scenario, the stratification of oceans causes nutrient-rich cold water to become trapped under warmer water, where sunlight for photosynthesis is most abundant. This inhibits the growth of phytoplankton, resulting in the decrease in their population, and the sulfate CCNs they produce, with increasing temperature. This interaction thus lowers cloud albedo through decreasing CCN-induced cloud formations and increases the solar radiation allowed to reach ocean surfaces, resulting in a positive-feedback loop.

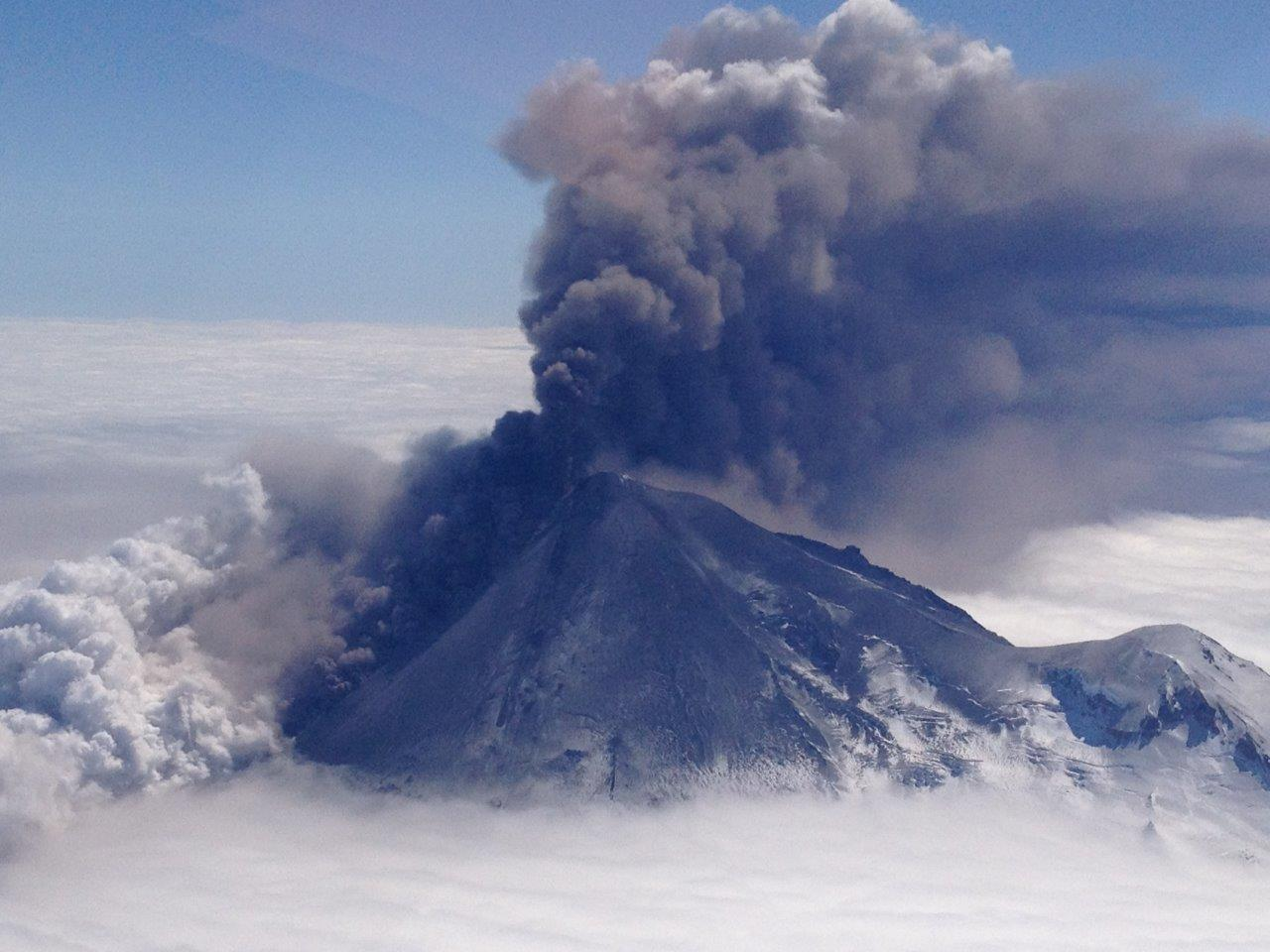
Volcanic ash and gas emissions from Alaska's Pavlof Volcano —NASA

== From volcanoes ==
Volcanoes emit a significant amount of microscopic gas and ash particles into the atmosphere when they erupt, which become atmospheric aerosols. By increasing the number of aerosol particles through gas-to-particle conversion processes, the contents of these eruptions can then affect the concentrations of potential cloud condensation nuclei (CCN) and ice nucleating particles (INP), which in turn affects cloud properties and leads to changes in local or regional climate.

Of these gases, sulfur dioxide, carbon dioxide, and water vapour are most commonly found in volcanic eruptions. While water vapour and carbon dioxide CCNs are naturally abundant in the atmosphere, the increase of sulfur dioxide CCNs can impact the climate by causing global cooling. Almost 9.2 Tg of sulfur dioxide (SO_{2}) is emitted from volcanoes annually. This sulphur dioxide undergoes a transformation into sulfuric acid, which quickly condenses in the stratosphere to produce fine sulphate aerosols. The Earth's lower atmosphere, or troposphere, cools as a result of the aerosols' increased capability to reflect solar radiation back into space.

== See also ==
- Bergeron process
- Contrail
- Evapotranspiration
- Global dimming
- Nucleation
- Seed crystal
- Water cycle
