= Supercooling =

Lowering the temperature of a liquid below its freezing point without it becoming a solid

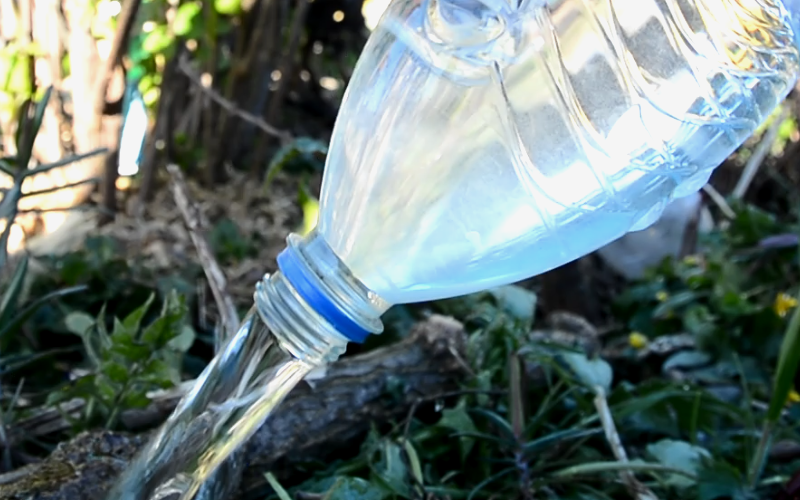
Supercooled water, still in liquid state

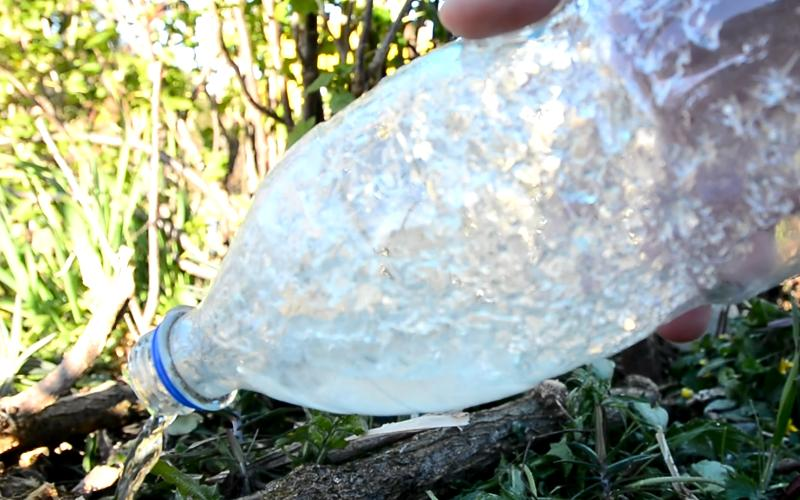
Start of solidification as a result of leaving the state of rest

Supercooling, also known as undercooling, is the process of lowering the temperature of a liquid below its freezing point without it becoming a solid. Per the established international definition, supercooling means "cooling a substance below the normal freezing point without solidification". While it can be achieved by different physical means, the postponed solidification is most often due to the absence of seed crystals or nuclei around which a crystal structure can form. The supercooling of water can be achieved without any special techniques other than chemical demineralization, down to −48.3 °C (−54.9 °F). Supercooled water can occur naturally, for example in the atmosphere, animals or plants.

This phenomenon was first described in 1724 by Daniel Gabriel Fahrenheit, while developing the Fahrenheit scale.

== Explanation ==
A liquid crossing its standard freezing point will crystallize in the presence of a seed crystal or nucleus around which a crystal structure can form creating a solid. Lacking any such nuclei, the liquid phase can be maintained all the way down to the temperature at which crystal homogeneous nucleation occurs.

Homogeneous nucleation can occur above the glass transition temperature, but if homogeneous nucleation has not occurred above that temperature, an amorphous (non-crystalline) solid will form.

Water normally freezes at 273.15 K (0.0 °C; 32 °F), but it can be "supercooled" at standard pressure down to its crystal homogeneous nucleation at almost 224.8 K (−48.3 °C; −55.0 °F). The process of supercooling requires water to be pure and free of nucleation sites, which can be achieved by processes like reverse osmosis or chemical demineralization, but the cooling itself does not require any specialised technique. If water is cooled at a rate on the order of 10^{6} K/s, the crystal nucleation can be avoided and water becomes a glass—that is, an amorphous (non-crystalline) solid. Its glass transition temperature is much colder and harder to determine, but studies estimate it at about 136 K (−137 °C; −215 °F). Glassy water can be heated up to approximately 150 K (−123 °C; −190 °F) without nucleation occurring. In the range of temperatures between 150 and 231 K (−123 and −42.2 °C; −190 and −43.9 °F), experiments find only crystal ice.

Droplets of supercooled water often exist in stratus and cumulus clouds. An aircraft flying through such a cloud sees an abrupt crystallization of these droplets, which can result in the formation of ice on the aircraft's wings or blockage of its instruments and probes, unless the aircraft is equipped with an appropriate ice protection system. Freezing rain is also caused by supercooled droplets.

The process opposite to supercooling, the melting of a solid above the freezing point, is much more difficult, and a solid will almost always melt at the same temperature for a given pressure. For this reason, it is the melting point which is typically identified, using melting point apparatus. Even when the subject of a paper is "freezing-point determination", the actual methodology is "the principle of observing the disappearance rather than the formation of ice". It is possible, at a given pressure, to superheat a liquid above its boiling point without it becoming gaseous.

Supercooling should not be confused with freezing-point depression. Supercooling is the cooling of a liquid below its freezing point without it becoming solid. Freezing point depression is when a solution can be cooled below the freezing point of the corresponding pure liquid due to the presence of the solute. An example of this is the freezing point depression that occurs when salt is added to pure water.

== Constitutional supercooling ==
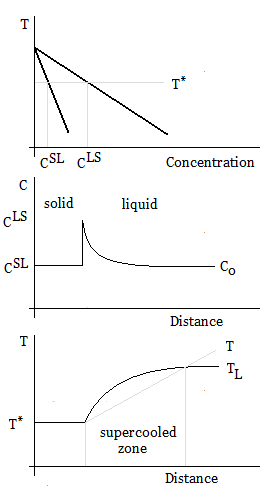
Constitutional supercooling – phase diagram, concentration, and temperature

Constitutional supercooling, which occurs during solidification, is due to compositional solid changes, and results in cooling a liquid below the freezing point ahead of the solid–liquid interface. When solidifying a liquid, the interface is often unstable, and the velocity of the solid–liquid interface must be small in order to avoid constitutional supercooling.

Constitutional supercooling is observed when the liquidus temperature gradient at the interface (the position x=0) is larger than the imposed temperature gradient:

$$\left.\frac{\partial T_L}{\partial x}\right|_{x=0} > \frac{\partial T}{\partial x}$$

The liquidus slope from the binary phase diagram is given by $m = \partial T_L / \partial C_L$, so the constitutional supercooling criterion for a binary alloy can be written in terms of the concentration gradient at the interface:

$$m \left.\frac{\partial C_L}{\partial x}\right|_{x=0} > \frac{\partial T}{\partial x}$$

The concentration gradient ahead of a planar interface is given by

$$\left.\frac{\partial C_L}{\partial x}\right|_{x=0} = -(C^{LS}-C^{SL})\frac{v}{D}$$

where $v$ is the interface velocity, $D$ the diffusion coefficient, and $C^{LS}$ and $C^{SL}$ are the compositions of the liquid and solid at the interface, respectively (i.e., $C^{LS}=C_L(x=0)$).

For the steady-state growth of a planar interface, the composition of the solid is equal to the nominal alloy composition, $C^{SL}=C_0$, and the partition coefficient, $k=C^{SL}/C^{LS}$, can be assumed constant. Therefore, the minimum thermal gradient necessary to create a stable solid front is given by

$$\frac{\partial T}{\partial x} = \frac{m C_0 (1-k) v}{kD}$$

For more information, see Chapter 3 of

== In animals ==
In order to survive extreme low temperatures in certain environments, some animals use the phenomenon of supercooling that allow them to remain unfrozen and avoid cell damage and death. There are many techniques that aid in maintaining a liquid state, such as the production of antifreeze proteins, or AFPs, which bind to ice crystals to prevent water molecules from binding and spreading the growth of ice. The winter flounder is one such fish that utilizes these proteins to survive in its frigid environment. The liver secretes noncolligative proteins into the bloodstream. Other animals use colligative antifreezes, which increase the concentration of solutes in their bodily fluids, thus lowering their freezing point. Fish that rely on supercooling for survival must also live well below the water surface, because if they came into contact with ice nuclei they would freeze immediately. Animals that undergo supercooling to survive must also remove ice-nucleating agents from their bodies because they act as a starting point for freezing. Supercooling is also a common feature in some insect, reptile, and other ectotherm species. The potato cyst nematode larva (Globodera rostochiensis) could survive inside their cysts in a supercooled state to temperatures as low as −38 °C (−36 °F), even with the cyst encased in ice.

As an animal gets further and further below its melting point, the chance of spontaneous freezing increases dramatically for its internal fluids, since this is a thermodynamically unstable state. The fluids eventually reach the supercooling point, which is the temperature where the supercooled solution freezes spontaneously due to being so far below its normal freezing point. Animals unintentionally undergo supercooling and are only able to decrease the odds of freezing once supercooled. Even though supercooling is essential for survival, there are many risks associated with it.

== In plants ==
Plants can also survive extreme cold conditions brought forth during the winter months. Many plant species located in northern climates can acclimate under these cold conditions by supercooling, thus these plants survive temperatures as low as −40 °C (−40 °F). Although this supercooling phenomenon is poorly understood, it has been recognized through infrared thermography. Ice nucleation occurs in certain plant organs and tissues, debatably beginning in the xylem tissue and spreading throughout the rest of the plant. Infrared thermography allows for droplets of water to be visualized as they crystalize in extracellular spaces.

Supercooling inhibits the formation of ice within the tissue by ice nucleation and allows the cells to maintain water in a liquid state and further allows the water within the cell to stay separate from extracellular ice. Cellular barriers such as lignin, suberin and the cuticle inhibit ice nucleators and force water into the supercooled tissue. The xylem and primary tissue of plants are very susceptible to cold temperatures because of the large proportion of water in the cell. Many boreal hardwood species in northern climates have the ability to prevent ice spreading into the shoots allowing the plant to tolerate the cold. Supercooling has been identified in the evergreen shrubs Rhododendron ferrugineum and Vaccinium vitis-idaea as well as Abies, Picea and Larix species. Freezing outside of the cell and within the cell wall does not affect the survival of the plant. However, the extracellular ice may lead to plant dehydration.

== In seawater ==
The presence of salt in seawater affects the freezing point. For that reason, it is possible for seawater to remain in the liquid state at temperatures below freezing point. This is "pseudo-supercooling" because the phenomenon is the result of freezing point lowering caused by the presence of salt, not supercooling. This condition is most commonly observed in the oceans around Antarctica where melting of the undersides of ice shelves at high-pressure results in liquid melt-water that can be below the freezing temperature. It is supposed that the water does not immediately refreeze due to a lack of nucleation sites. This provides a challenge to oceanographic instrumentation as ice crystals will readily form on the equipment, potentially affecting the data quality. The presence of extremely cold seawater will ultimately affect the growth of sea ice.

== Applications ==
One commercial application of supercooling is in refrigeration. Freezers can cool drinks to a supercooled level so that when they are opened, they form a slush. Another example is a product that can supercool the beverage in a conventional freezer. The Coca-Cola Company briefly marketed special vending machines containing Sprite in the UK, and Coke in Singapore, which stored the bottles in a supercooled state so that their content would turn to slush upon opening.

Supercooling was successfully applied to organ preservation at Massachusetts General Hospital/Harvard Medical School. Livers that were later transplanted into recipient animals were preserved by supercooling for up to 4 days, quadrupling the limits of what could be achieved by conventional liver preservation methods. The livers were supercooled to a temperature of −6 °C (21 °F) in a specialized solution that protected against freezing and injury from the cold temperature.

Another potential application is drug delivery. In 2015, researchers crystallized membranes at a specific time. Liquid-encapsulated drugs could be delivered to the site and, with a slight environmental change, the liquid rapidly changes into a crystalline form that releases the drug.

In 2016, a team at Iowa State University proposed a method for "soldering without heat" by using encapsulated droplets of supercooled liquid metal to repair heat sensitive electronic devices. In 2019, the same team demonstrated the use of supercooled metal to print solid metallic interconnects on surfaces ranging from polar (paper and Jello) to superhydrophobic (rose petals), with all the surfaces being lower modulus than the metal.

Eftekhari et al. proposed an empirical theory explaining that supercooling of ionic liquid crystals can build ordered channels for diffusion for energy storage applications. In this case, the electrolyte has a rigid structure comparable to a solid electrolyte, but the diffusion coefficient can be as large as in liquid electrolytes. Supercooling increases the medium viscosity, but keeps the directional channels open for diffusion.

In 2017, a lab at the University of Hawaiʻi at Mānoa demonstrated that a combination of pulsed electric fields and oscillating magnetic fields can prevent the sudden nucleation of ice crystals. Chicken meat was cooled to −6.5 °C (20.3 °F) in the presence of these fields, and it was subsequently shown that the unfrozen meat retained its quality without significant freezer burn. Following experiments were conducted with fish and beef, where similar preservation effects were observed.

== See also ==
- Amorphous solid
- Freezing rain
- Pumpable ice technology
- Subcooling
- Superheating
- Ultracold atom
- Viscous liquid
