= Bridge School (Michigan) =

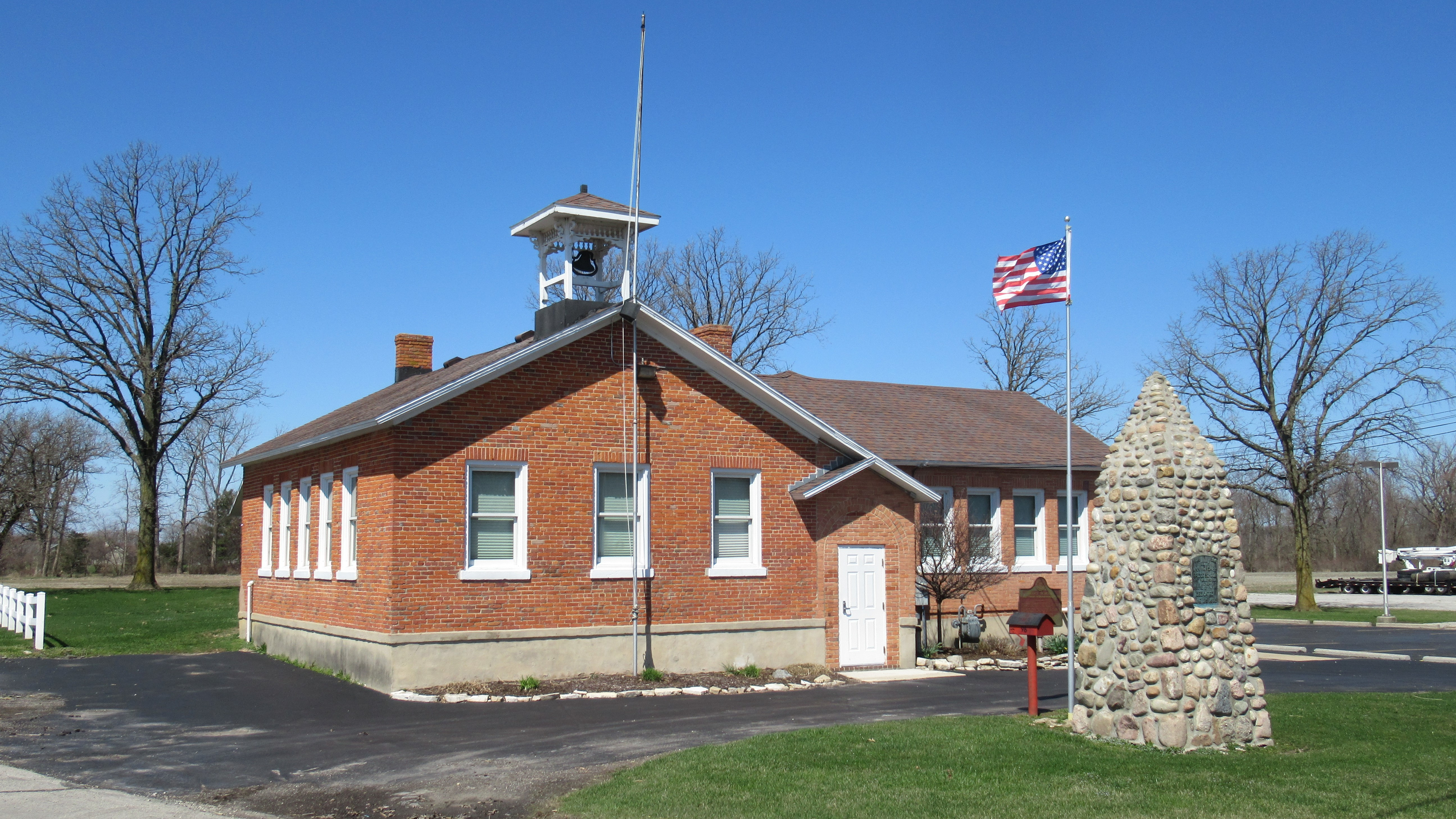

- Location within the state of Michigan
- 41°57′39″N 83°32′55″W
- Location: 96 Ida Maybee Road; Raisinville Township, Michigan

History
- Built: 1828; 1868 (current structure)

Michigan State Historic Site
- Designated: December 17, 1987

The Bridge School is a former school building located in rural Raisinville Township in the U.S. state of Michigan. It is recognized as the first public school in the Territory of Michigan when it was founded in 1828. The school district closed in 1946, and the building has served as Raisinville Township Hall since 1982. The Bridge School was listed as a Michigan State Historic Site on December 17, 1987.

== Description ==
The first structure known as the Bridge School was constructed in 1828 and rebuilt in 1832. It was a simple log cabin schoolhouse built using wood from walnut trees. The log cabin was replaced with the current brick structure in 1868. The structure is a one-story, end-gable, solid red-brick, vernacular building with a tin roof. It sits atop a limestone foundation. The schoolhouse originally contained two rooms. In 1910, a significantly large addition was added to the brick structure using the same architectural designs.

== Early history ==
The passage of the first public school law by the Michigan Territorial Legislative Council on April 12, 1827, made education a municipal responsibility and required local governments to organize their own school systems. Shortly after, Monroe County, which was one of only two formally organized counties in Michigan at the time alongside Wayne County, created its first school district and opened the Bridge School on April 17, 1828, with funding from the territorial government. Although the Bridge School holds the distinction of being the first public school founded in Michigan, it was not the first school in the region's history, as numerous subscription schools had opened earlier during the French and British colonial periods.

The Bridge School was centrally located within Monroe County, and its name came from the recently constructed Bruckner Bridge near the River Raisin, just north of the schoolhouse. The log structure was eventually replaced by a two-room brick schoolhouse in 1868. Several more rooms were added to the brick structure in 1910.

On the centennial anniversary of the Bridge School in 1928, an obelisk was erected in front of the building with stones that students and alumni brought for the celebration.

== Recent history ==
The Bridge School served as an educational facility for 118 years from 1828 to 1946. The building ceased operation as a school in 1946 and was completely shuttered in 1950. Students were absorbed into Dundee Community Schools in neighboring Dundee Township. Dundee Community Schools took ownership of the now-defunct Bridge School, but the structure remained vacant.

In 1956, the board of education for Dundee Community Schools donated the unused building to the Monroe County Historical Society. The property was later deeded to Raisinville Township in 1980. The township renovated the structure and converted it into their township hall in 1982, and it served as a polling place for the first time that year as well. The Bridge School was recognized as a Michigan State Historic Site on December 17, 1987. A historic marker detailing the school's history was erected by the Monroe County Historical Society. The structure continues to serve as the township hall for Raisinville Township. The hall is located at 96 Ida Maybee Road just north of M-50 (South Custer Road). Ida Maybee Road was once designated as part of M-130 when it was a state highway from 1929 to 1955.

== Images ==
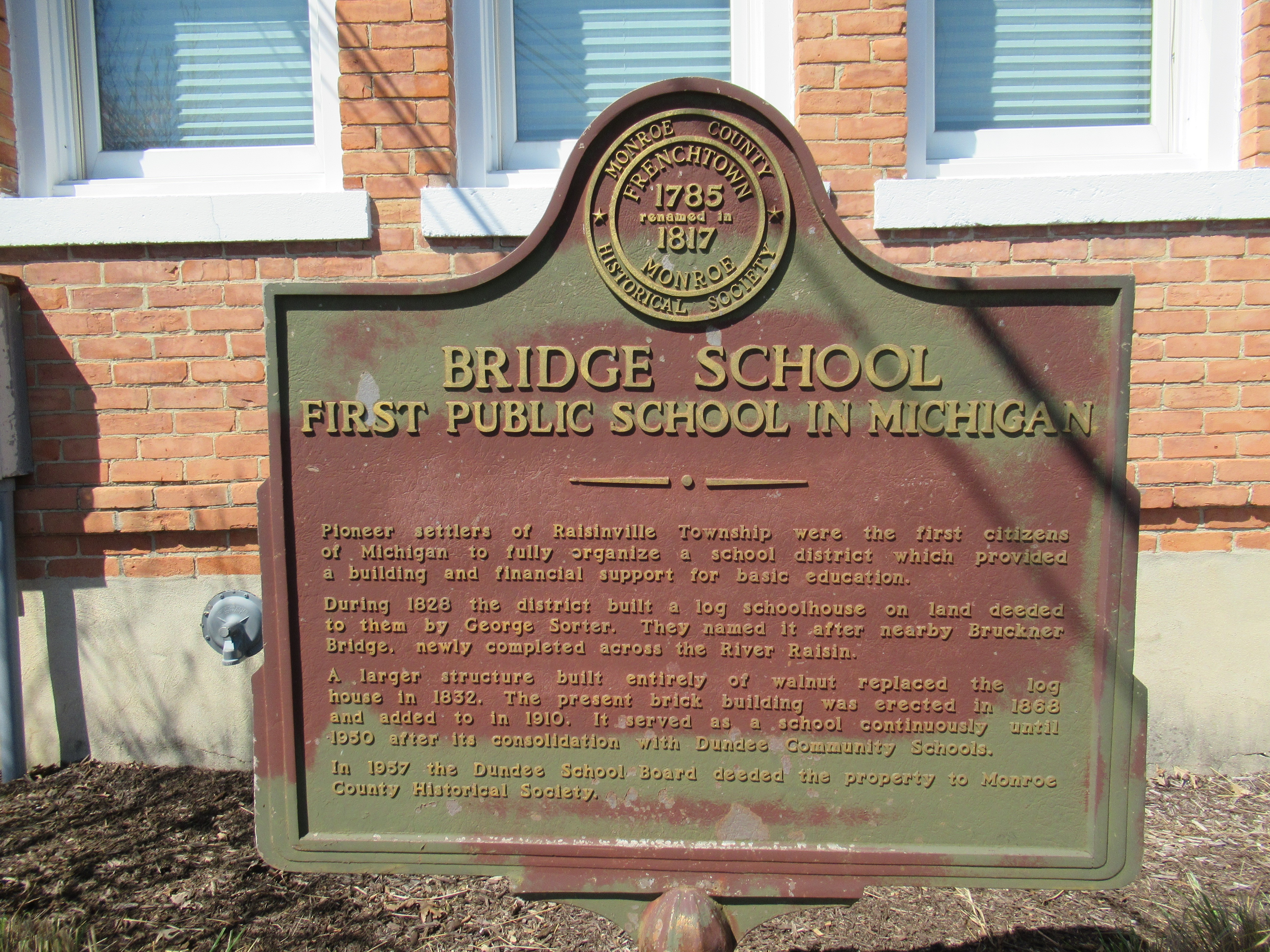
A county historic marker
recognizing the former school

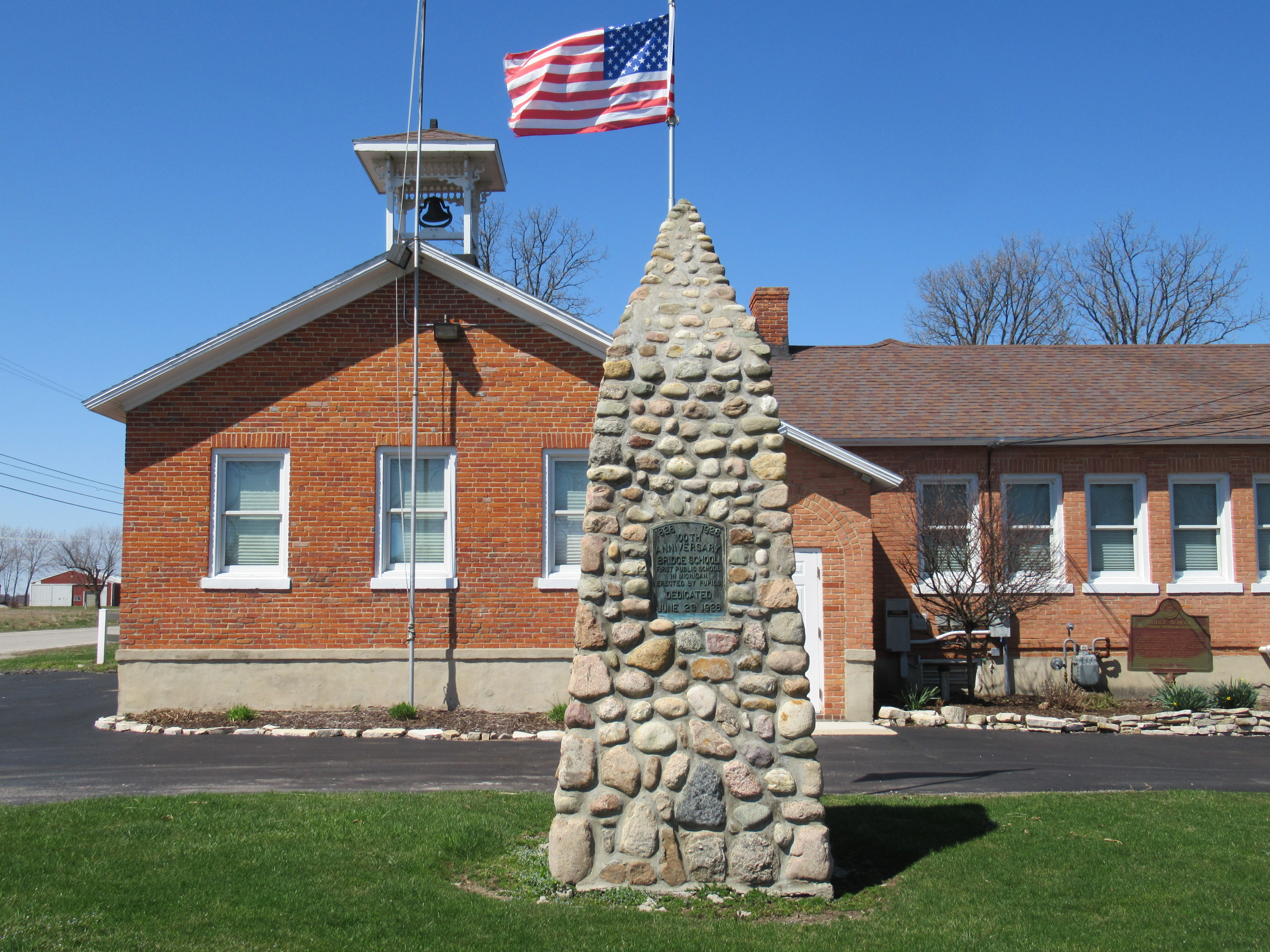
An obelisk, dedicated in 1928 to commemorate the school's centennial

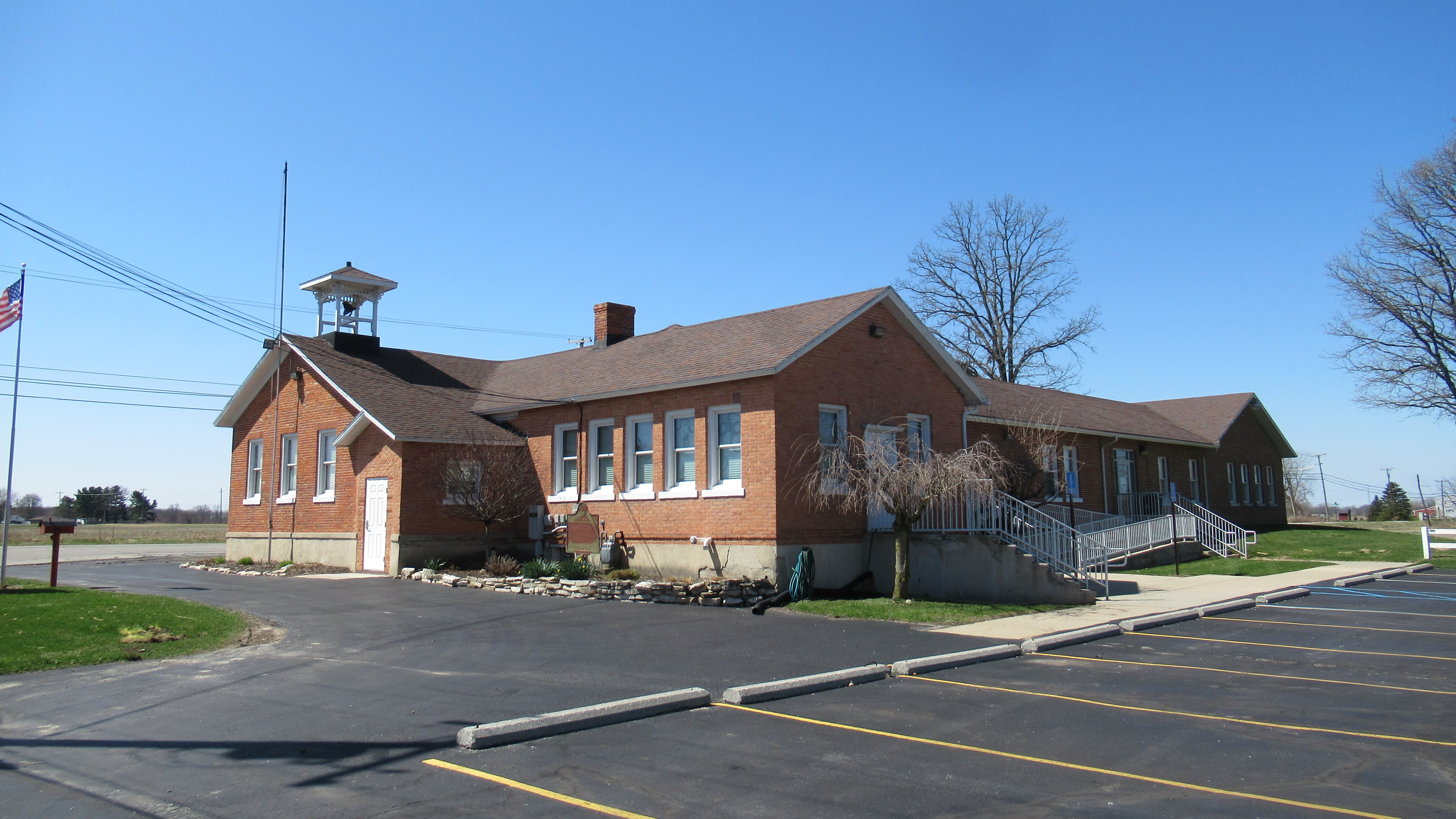
The side view showing the 1910
addition to the original structure
