= Raisinville Township, Michigan =

- Civil township
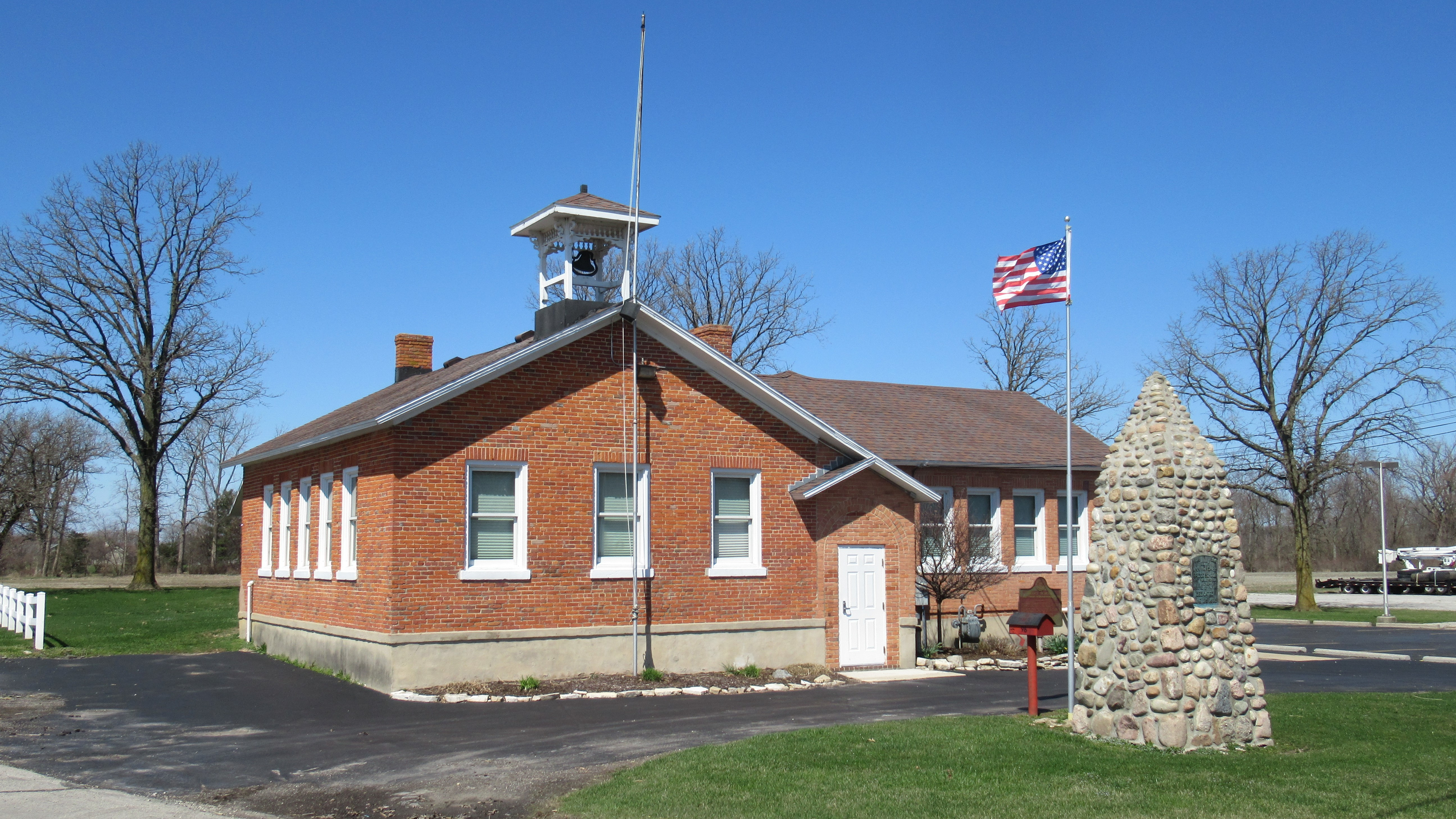
- Raisinville Township Hall

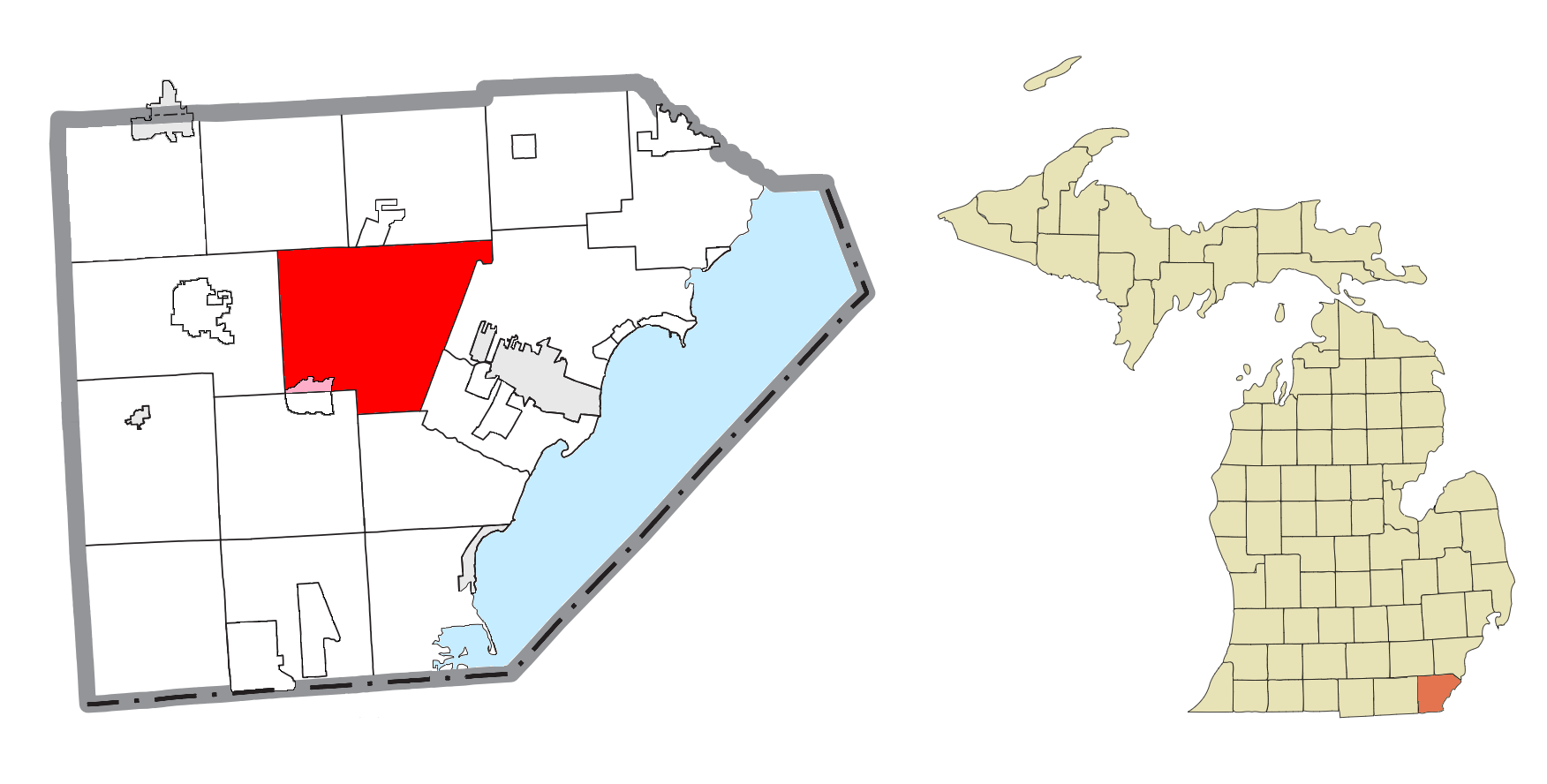
- Location within Monroe County and the state of Michigan

- Location within Michigan Location within the United States
- Coordinates: 41°56′49″N 83°31′48″W
- Country: United States
- State: Michigan
- County: Monroe
- Organized: 1823

Government
  - Supervisor: Gerald Blanchette
  - Clerk: Brenda Fetterly

Area
  - Total: 48.54 sq mi (125.72 km^{2})
  - Land: 48.14 sq mi (124.68 km^{2})
  - Water: 0.40 sq mi (1.04 km^{2})
- Elevation: 630 ft (192 m)

Population (2020)
  - Total: 5,903
  - Density: 122.6/sq mi (47.3/km^{2})
- Time zone: UTC-5 (Eastern (EST))
  - Summer (DST): UTC-4 (EDT)
- ZIP Code: 48161, 48162 (Monroe); 48131 (Dundee); 48140 (Ida); 48117 (Carleton)
- Area code: 734
- FIPS code: 26-115-66900
- GNIS feature ID: 1626951
- Website: www.raisinville.org

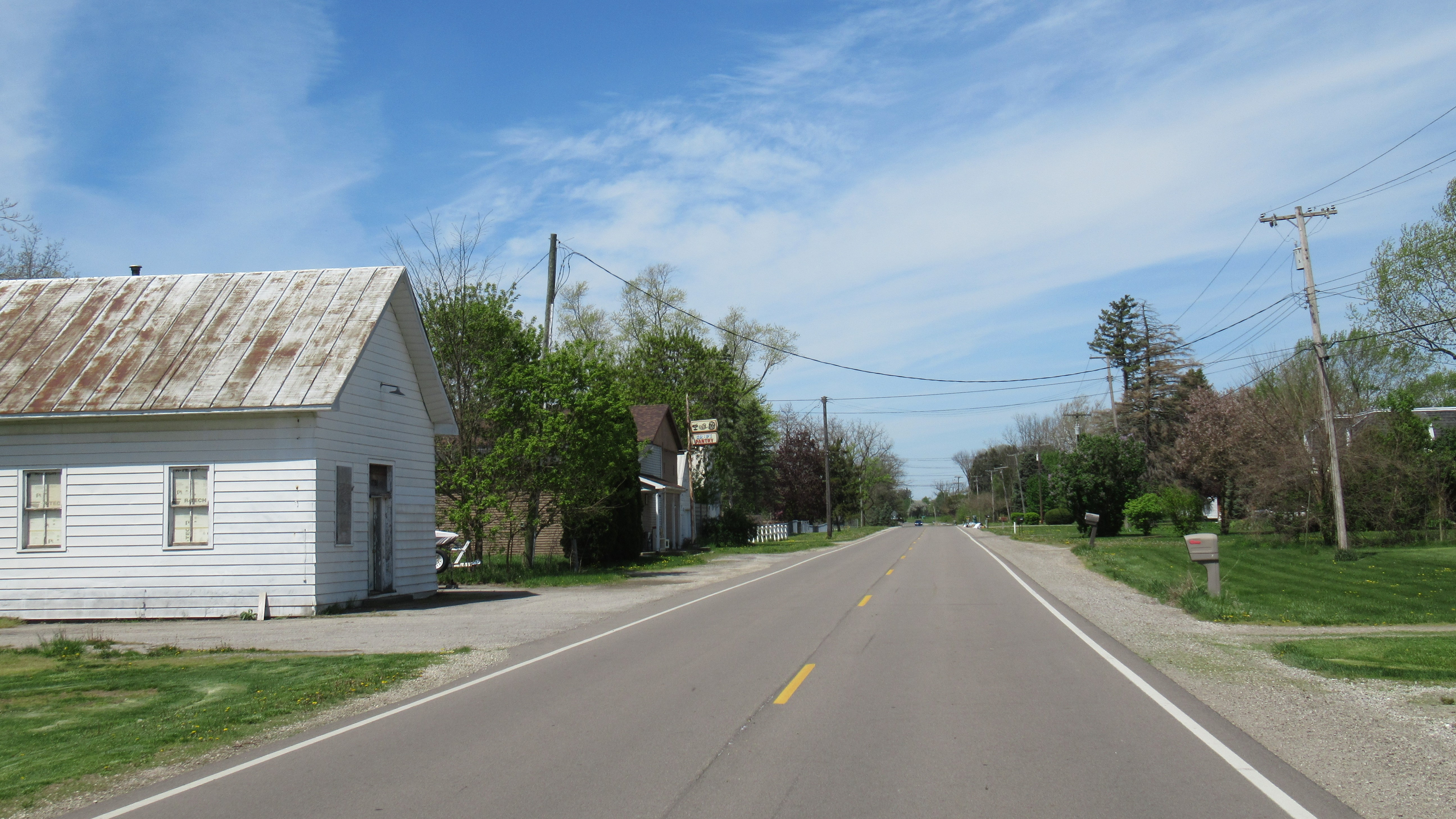
Community of Grape looking west along North Custer Road

Raisinville Township is a civil township of Monroe County in the U.S. state of Michigan. The population was 5,903 at the 2020 census.

== History ==
Raisinville Township was first organized in 1823 within Monroe County in the Michigan Territory. Riley Ingersoll, one of the area's first settlers, served as the first township supervisor. Several later townships within the county were organized from the township's original boundaries.

The Bridge School is recognized as the first public school district in the state of Michigan (then the Michigan Territory) when it opened in 1828. It operated until 1946 before being closed down and absorbed into Dundee Community Schools. The building was later donated to the township and began serving as the township hall in 1982. The Bridge School was listed as a Michigan State Historic Site on December 17, 1987.

On January 9, 1997, Comair Flight 3272 crashed into a corn field in Raisinville Township. The Embraer EMB 120 Brasilia aircraft, operated by COMAIR Airlines, Inc., experienced icing conditions and crashed during a rapid descent. All 26 passengers and three crewmembers died in the crash.

== Communities ==
- East Raisinville is a former settlement located in the eastern portion of the township along the Lake Shore and Michigan Southern Railway. A post office named "Atkinson" opened on May 22, 1829, and was renamed East Raisinville on January 20, 1838. The post office closed on November 24, 1868.
- Grape is an unincorporated community located in the central portion of the township along North Custer Road (formerly M-130) at 41°57′49″N 83°32′22″W. The community had its own post office from June 1, 1887, to October 15, 1906. The community was named after the township, as raisin is French for grape.
- Hamlin is a former community located along the railway line within the township. The community was named after then-vice president Hannibal Hamlin, and the community received a post office on March 28, 1862. The Hamlin post office was transferred to Raisinville on October 2, 1876.
- Ida is an unincorporated community and census-designated place on the southern boundary of the township at 41°54′39″N 83°34′25″W. Most of the community is located south of Ida West Road in Ida Township, while small development extends north of the township boundary. The Ida 48140 ZIP Code serves a small portion of Raisinville Township.
- North Raisinville is a former settlement located in the northern portion of the township. It was originally known as "Taylorsville" after Amos Taylor, who became the first postmaster on March 6, 1833. The post office was renamed to North Raisinville on January 20, 1838, and closed on March 19, 1879.
- Raisinville was the first settlement in the township when Colonel John Anderson came to the area in 1822, and Blanchard became the first permanent settler in 1823. The community and township were named after the River Raisin, and the township was organized that same year. The community was located about 2.5 miles (4.0 km) east of Dundee. The Raisinville post office opened in June 1825 but closed on March 20, 1828. It reopened under the name "West Raisinville" on November 28, 1832, but changed back to Raisinville on July 24, 1833. The name changed once again back to West Raisinville on January 20, 1838, until it closed on February 17, 1842. The Hamlin post office was transferred to Raisinville on October 2, 1876, and ultimately closed on October 15, 1906.
- Strasburg is an unincorporated community located at the intersection of West Dunbar Road and Strasburg Road in the southeast portion of the township at 41°54′51″N 83°30′09″W. It was first settled in 1828, as a location for lime kiln. A community eventually developed, and a post office was established on June 24, 1874, but soon discontinued on July 11, 1876. The Lake Shore & Michigan Southern Railroad built a line through the area in 1878, the post office was restored on February 12, 1879, until 1922.

== Geography ==
Raisinville is in central Monroe County, between Monroe, the county seat, to the southeast and Dundee to the west. According to the U.S. Census Bureau, the township has a total area of 48.54 square miles (125.72 km^{2}), of which 48.14 square miles (124.68 km^{2}) are land and 0.40 square miles (1.04 km^{2}), or 0.82%, are water.

The River Raisin flows through the center of the township, and Sandy Creek flows through the northeast corner.

=== Major highways ===
- M-50 (South Custer Road) runs west–east through the center of the township.
- M-130 (North Custer Road) was a designated state highway from 1929 to 1955.

== Education ==
Raisinville Township is served by three separate school districts. The northeastern portion of the township is served by Monroe Public Schools, in which Raisinville Elementary School is the only public school located within the township. The southern half of the township is served by Ida Public Schools, and the northwest corner of the township is served by Dundee Community Schools.

== Demographics ==
Historical population
Census	Pop.	Note	%±
1850	967		—
1860	1,448		49.7%
1870	1,793		23.8%
1880	2,035		13.5%
1890	1,830		−10.1%
1900	1,811		−1.0%
1910	1,693		−6.5%
1920	1,541		−9.0%
1930	1,840		19.4%
1940	1,990		8.2%
1950	2,225		11.8%
1960	3,277		47.3%
1970	4,009		22.3%
1980	4,797		19.7%
1990	4,634		−3.4%
2000	4,896		5.7%
2010	5,816		18.8%
2020	5,903		1.5%
U.S. Decennial Census

As of the census of 2000, there were 4,896 people, 1,691 households, and 1,423 families residing in the township. The population density was 101.6 inhabitants per square mile (39.2/km^{2}). There were 1,762 housing units at an average density of 36.6 per square mile (14.1/km^{2}). The racial makeup of the township was 97.94% White, 0.49% African American, 0.16% Native American, 0.25% Asian, 0.31% from other races, and 0.86% from two or more races. Hispanic or Latino of any race were 1.21% of the population.

There were 1,691 households, out of which 36.8% had children under the age of 18 living with them, 74.1% were married couples living together, 6.7% had a female householder with no husband present, and 15.8% were non-families. 13.5% of all households were made up of individuals, and 6.0% had someone living alone who was 65 years of age or older. The average household size was 2.88 and the average family size was 3.16.

In the township the population was spread out, with 26.6% under the age of 18, 8.0% from 18 to 24, 27.5% from 25 to 44, 27.7% from 45 to 64, and 10.3% who were 65 years of age or older. The median age was 38 years. For every 100 females, there were 102.8 males. For every 100 females age 18 and over, there were 101.0 males.

The median income for a household in the township was $62,734, and the median income for a family was $69,896. Males had a median income of $50,727 versus $29,459 for females. The per capita income for the township was $26,520. About 1.4% of families and 2.9% of the population were below the poverty line, including 1.1% of those under age 18 and 3.9% of those age 65 or over.
