= Ted Rath =

American football coach (born 1983)

New Orleans Saints
- Title: Director of sports science

Personal information
- Born: November 22, 1983 (age 42)
- Listed height: 6 ft 0 in (1.83 m)
- Listed weight: 232 lb (105 kg)

Career information
- Position: Linebacker
- High school: Dundee High School
- College: University of Toledo

Career history
- Crestwood High School (2006–2007) Assistant coach/ director of speed and strength training; Toledo (2007–2009) Graduate assistant (2007–2009) Assistant director of strength and conditioning (2009); Detroit Lions (2009–2015) Assistant strength and conditioning; Miami Dolphins (2016) Assistant strength and conditioning; Los Angeles Rams (2017–2019); Strength and conditioning (2017); Director of strength training and performance (2018–2019); Philadelphia Eagles (2020–2023) Director of sports performance; New Orleans Saints (2025–present) Director of sports science

Theodore Daniel Rath (born November 22, 1983) is an American football coach who currently serves as the director of sports science for the New Orleans Saints of the National Football League (NFL). Rath has served as a strength and sports performance coach for various teams in the National Football League (NFL). He has coached on the professional level since 2009.

== High school and college ==
Rath graduated from Dundee High School in Dundee, Michigan, where he was an honor roll student. He played football for the Vikings, and was named second-team all-league, all-county and all-region as a senior, as well as being named defensive MVP of the Monroe County All-Star game. He went on to play collegiately at the University of Toledo, and was a member of the Rockets' 2004 Mid-American Conference championship squad.

After graduating from Toledo, Rath spent one year at Crestwood High School in Dearborn Heights, Michigan, where he served as an assistant football coach and directed the school's speed and strength training. From 2007 to 2009, Rath returned to the University of Toledo as a graduate assistant, focusing on strength and conditioning for athletes in the college's athletic programs. In his final year there, he served as the assistant director of strength and conditioning.

== Professional career ==
=== Detroit Lions ===
In 2009, Rath was hired by the Detroit Lions as part of the staff of new head coach Jim Schwartz. He remained an assistant strength and conditioning coach throughout Schwartz's five years, and remained on the Lions' staff after Schwartz was fired under Jim Caldwell. While with the Lions, Rath helped start the annual Detroit Lions Strength and Conditioning Clinic in 2011, which was a forum for providing, sharing and exchanging information in the strength and conditioning community. He and other members of the Lions staff were dismissed by newly-hired team general manager Mike Quinn following the 2015 season. During his time with the Lions, the team qualified for the playoffs twice.

=== Miami Dolphins ===
Rath joined the Miami Dolphins as an assistant strength and conditioning coach for newly-hired head coach Adam Gase. In his only season with the Dolphins, the team made it to the playoffs for the first time in 8 seasons.

=== Los Angeles Rams ===
In 2017, new head coach Sean McVay hired Rath to be the head strength and conditioning coach for the Los Angeles Rams. After his first season, he was promoted and given the title of director of strength training and performance. During the Rams' 36–31 victory over the Seattle Seahawks on November 11, 2018, Rath was recorded by NFL Films shadowing McVay and sometimes pulling his head coach out of the way when referees or game action would come too close. Both McVay and Rath were interviewed for a profile piece called "The Art of the Get Back Coach," which was aired on NFL Films Presents in January 2019. The clip went viral and has been viewed more than 8 million times.

Rath helped the 2018 team reach the Super Bowl. The team was recognized as the healthiest team in the NFL and Rath was recognized as a contributing factor that lead to these results.

=== Philadelphia Eagles ===
On February 7, 2020, the Philadelphia Eagles announced the hiring of Rath as the team's director of sports performance. After his first season, Rath was promoted and given the title of vice president of player performance. Rath was a member of the head coach hiring committee in 2021 when the team hired Nick Sirianni. The team reached the Super Bowl following the 2022 season. Rath is credited with driving efforts that increased player availability and health that contributed to winning the conference. After the conclusion of the 2023 season, the Eagles and Rath parted ways.

=== New Orleans Saints ===
On February 19, 2025, the New Orleans Saints hired Rath to serve as the team's director of sports science under head coach Kellen Moore.

== Personal life ==
Rath is married and has three children. His first book became an Amazon best-seller. In https://www.amazon.com/Beyond-Comfort-Mastering-Mindset-Excellence/dp/1964811732 Beyond Comfort: Mastering a Growth Mindset with Excellence through Urgency Rath offers simple but actionable habits that will help you improve the outcomes in your personal and professional life.

In 2024 Rath partnered with The Daily Coach to become the first ever lead coach and facilitator for The Daily Coach Academy. This vetted community has diverse backgrounds in leadership roles across business and sports. Rath helps to plan curriculum and runs learning sessions. Each month the Daily Coach Academy guides learning through exclusive and curated materials.

Rath has been a featured keynote speaker both domestically and abroad. He has spoken at events spanning three continents.

On March 15, 2019, the Ventura County District Attorney announced that Rath was being charged with three counts of misdemeanor sexual battery, to which Rath's attorney issued a plea of not guilty. The charges resulted from an incident in Moorpark, California that occurred in June 2018 involving a female acquaintance. A statement was issued to the Associated Press by Rath's attorney, Vicki Podberesky, that read, "Mr. Rath takes these allegations very seriously...Ted is a man who has led a law-abiding life. He is a husband, a father and a dedicated family man. He has the utmost respect for women and would never intentionally act in a manner that was demeaning or otherwise inappropriate. We intend to defend this matter to the fullest extent possible in a court of law, and we believe that after there has been a full vetting of the facts of this case Mr. Rath will be shown to be not guilty of these charges." The case was adjudicated over the course of six days, during which former Rams defensive tackle Ndamukong Suh testified on Rath's behalf. On July 12, 2019, the jury found Rath not guilty on all three counts, and Rath resumed his role with the Rams. McVay commented on Rath's return, stating, "I think it was certainly a good learning experience for all of us, and for Ted especially."
