= M130 =

M130 may refer to:

- Mercedes-Benz M130 engine, a straight-6-cylinder engine

M-130 may refer to:

- M-130 highway (Michigan), a road in the United States of America
- Martin M-130, a seaplane
