= Icing (aeronautics) =

Formation of water ice on aircraft surfaces

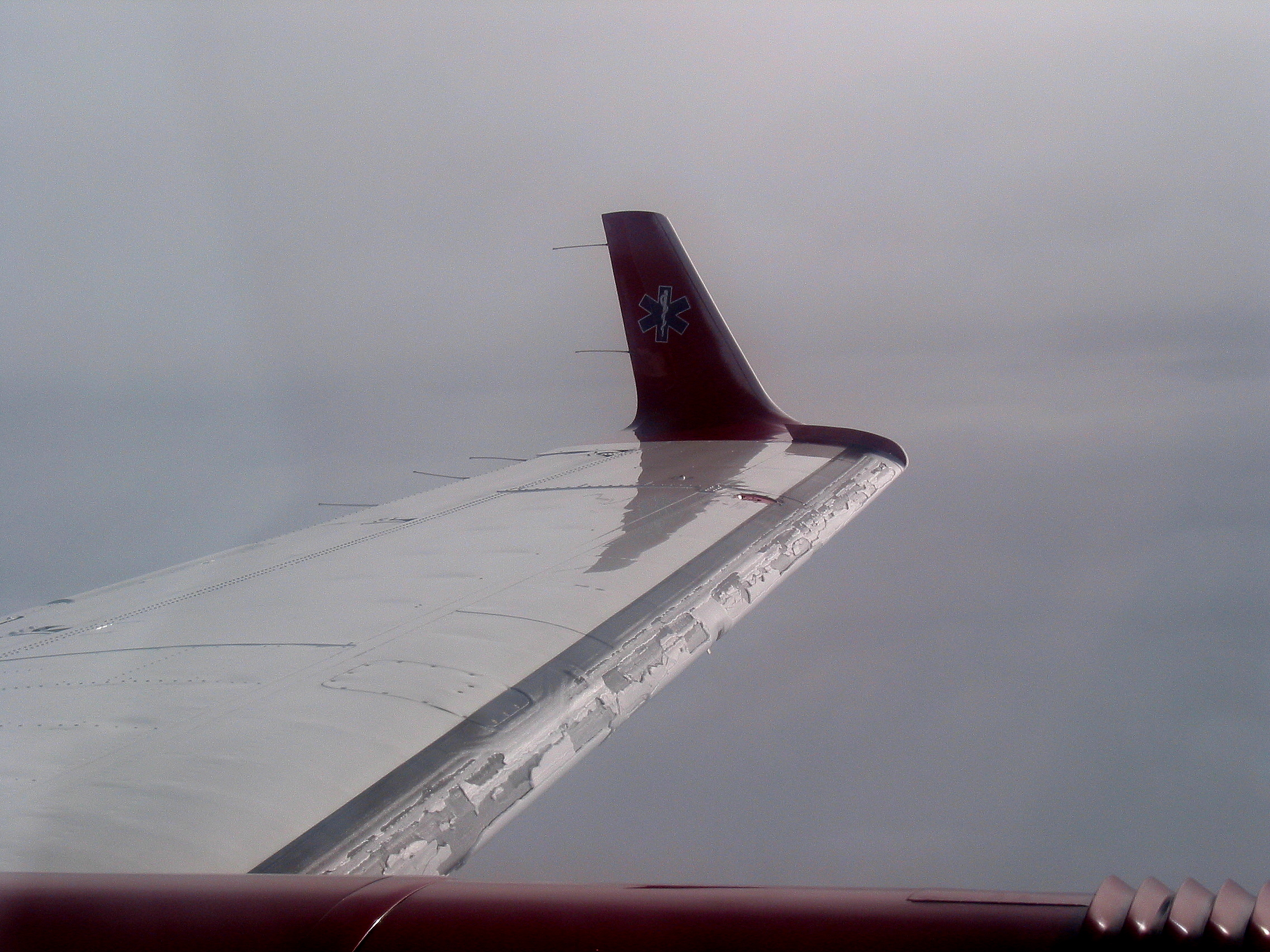
Ice accumulated and partially removed on the wing of a Beechcraft King Air

In aeronautics, icing is the formation of water ice on an aircraft. Icing has resulted in numerous fatal accidents in aviation history. Ice accretion and accumulation can affect the external surfaces of an aircraft – in which case it is referred to as airframe icing – or the engine, resulting in carburetor icing, air inlet icing or more generically engine icing. These phenomena may, but do not necessarily occur together.

Not all aircraft, especially general aviation aircraft, are certified for flight into known icing (FIKI) – that is flying into areas with icing conditions certain or likely to exist, based on pilot reports, observations, and forecasts. In order to be FIKI-certified, aircraft must be fitted with suitable ice protection systems to prevent accidents by icing.

== Definition ==
Icing conditions exist when the air contains droplets of supercooled water. They freeze on contact with a potential nucleation site, which in this case is the parts of the aircraft, causing icing. Icing conditions are characterized quantitatively by the average droplet size, the liquid water content and the air temperature. These parameters affect the extent, type and speed that characterize the formation of ice on an aircraft. Federal Aviation Regulations contain a definition of icing conditions that some aircraft are certified to fly into. So-called SLD, or supercooled large droplet, conditions are those that exceed that specification and represent a particular hazard to aircraft, which all aircraft must try to avoid.

Qualitatively, pilot reports indicate icing conditions in terms of their effect upon the aircraft, and will be dependent upon the preexisting capabilities of the aircraft. Different aircraft may report the same quantitative conditions as different levels of icing as a result. Ice detectors are often used to indicate the presence of icing conditions.

=== Types of structural ice ===
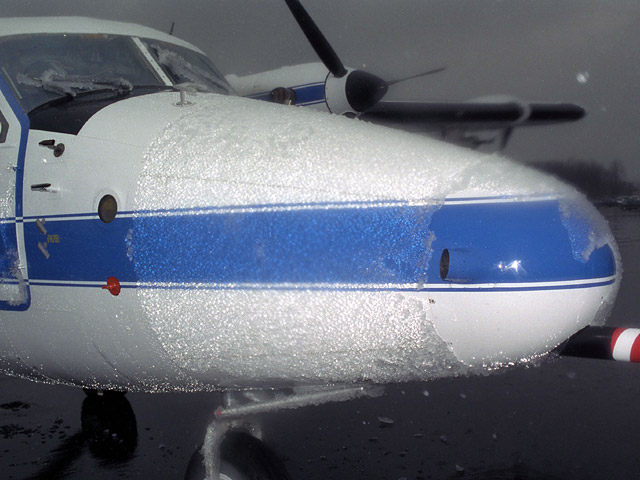
Supercooled large droplet (SLD) ice on a NASA Twin Otter research aircraft

- Clear ice is often clear and smooth. Supercooled water droplets, or freezing rain, strike a surface but do not freeze instantly. Often "horns" or protrusions are formed and project into the airflow, which smoothens it out. This form of ice is also called glaze.
- Rime ice is rough and opaque, formed by supercooled drops rapidly freezing on impact. Forming mostly along an airfoil's stagnation point, it generally conforms to the shape of the airfoil.
- Mixed ice is a combination of clear and rime ice, having both properties.
- Frost ice is the result of water freezing on unprotected surfaces while the aircraft is stationary, before flight even starts. This can be dangerous when flight is attempted because it disrupts an airfoil's boundary layer airflow causing a premature aerodynamic stall and, in some cases, dramatically increased drag making takeoff dangerous or impossible, which could lead to accidents prematurely.
- SLD ice refers to ice formed in supercooled large droplet (SLD) conditions. It is similar to clear ice, but because droplet size is large, it extends to unprotected parts of the aircraft and forms larger ice shapes, faster than normal icing conditions, which nearly all aircraft aren't sufficiently protected from. This was a factor in the crash of American Eagle Flight 4184.

=== Factors ===
The structural icing of an aircraft is largely determined by three factors: supercooled liquid water content, which decides how much water is available for icing; air temperature, with half of all reported icing occurring between −8 °C (18 °F) and −12 °C (10 °F); and droplet size, with small droplets influencing aircraft's leading edges and large droplets can impact further aft of the airfoil. Airspeed influence the icing too. In general, the faster the speed, the more ice accumulation. However, this is counteracted by airframe surface friction at higher airspeed, and as a result, structural icing is minimal when speed is above 575 kn (1,065 km/h; 662 mph). Additionally, the design of the aircraft will also influence the icing.

In stratiform clouds, icing is more mild. It generally form as rime or mixed icing and tends to be confined in a 3,000–4,000 ft (910–1,200 m) thick layer. In contrast, icing intensity level in cumuliform clouds may range from trace for small cumulus to severe for large ones in the form of clear or mixed icing in the upper levels and can extend to great heights.

== Effect ==
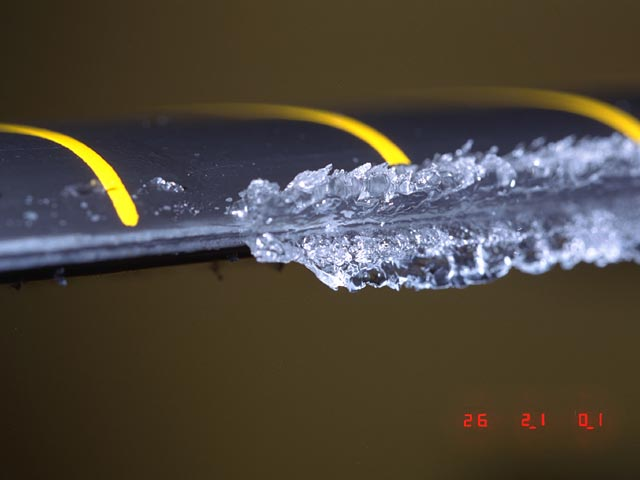
Ice protrusions on a helicopter rotor blade obtained in a wind tunnel at NASA Glenn Research Center

The wing will ordinarily stall at a lower angle of attack, and thus a higher airspeed, when contaminated with ice because of the significantly lowered lift coefficient and increased aerodynamic drag. Even small amounts of ice will have an effect, and if the ice is rough, it can be a large effect nonetheless. Thus an increase in approach speed is advisable if ice remains on the wings. How much of an increase depends on both the aircraft type and amount of ice. Stall characteristics of an aircraft with ice-contaminated wings will be degraded, and serious roll control problems are not unusual. The ice accretion may be asymmetric between the two wings which requires calibrating. Also, the outer part of a wing, which is ordinarily thinner and thus a better collector of ice, is likely to stall first.

=== Effect on unmanned aircraft ===
Unmanned aircraft are an emerging technology with a large variety of commercial and military applications. In-flight icing occurs during flight in supercooled clouds or freezing precipitation and is a potential hazard to all aircraft. In-flight icing on UAVs imposes a major limitation on the operational envelope.

Unmanned aircraft are more sensitive and susceptible to icing compared to manned aircraft. The main differences between UAVs and manned aircraft when it comes to icing are:

- Size and weight: Small aircraft accumulate ice faster, and more ice per unit area, compared to large aircraft. UAVs are typically smaller than manned aircraft and therefore more sensitive to icing. Furthermore, the added mass from ice accretions can have quick negative effects on UAVs with stringent weight restrictions.
- Flight velocity: High airspeeds lead to heating on the wings or propellers of the aircraft, which can counteract icing to some degree. Current UAVs generally fly at lower velocities than manned aircraft and will not benefit from the same heating effect. Therefore, icing on UAVs can occur at a broader range of temperatures than on manned aircraft.
- Laminar flow: The Reynolds number for UAVs is approximately an order of magnitude lower than that for manned aircraft. This leads to UAVs operating in flow regimes where laminar flow effects are more prevalent than turbulent flow effects. Because laminar flow is more easily disturbed than turbulent flow, the negative effects of icing are bigger.
- Type: Rotary-wing UAVs are typically more sensitive to icing than fixed-wing UAVs.

The parts of the UAV most exposed to icing are the airspeed sensor, the leading edge of aerodynamic surfaces, rotors, and propellers.

Icing on UAVs is a global phenomenon, and icing conditions at the operational altitude can occur year-round around the world. However, icing risks are particularly big in the sub arctics, Arctic and Antarctic. In large parts of the Nordics, for example, icing conditions are present from 35% to more than 80% of the time from September through May.

== Prevention and removal ==
De-icing an Embraer Legacy 450 prior to the flight

Several methods exist to reduce the dangers of icing. The first, and simplest, is to avoid icing conditions altogether, but for many flights this is not practical.

=== Pre-flight protection ===
If ice (or other contaminants) are present on an aircraft prior to takeoff, they must be removed from critical surfaces. Removal can take many forms:

- Mechanical means, which may be as simple as using a broom or brush to remove snow
- Application of deicing fluid or even hot water to remove ice, snow, etc.
- Use of infrared heating to melt and remove contaminants
- Putting the aircraft into a heated hangar until snow and ice have melted
- Positioning aircraft towards the Sun to maximize heating up of snow and ice covered surfaces. In practice this method is limited to thin contamination, by the time and weather conditions.

All of these methods remove existing contamination, but provide no practical protection in icing conditions. If icing conditions exist, or are expected before takeoff, then anti-icing fluids are used. These are thicker than deicing fluids and resist the effects of snow and rain for some time. They are intended to shear off the aircraft during takeoff and provide no inflight protection.

=== In-flight protection systems ===
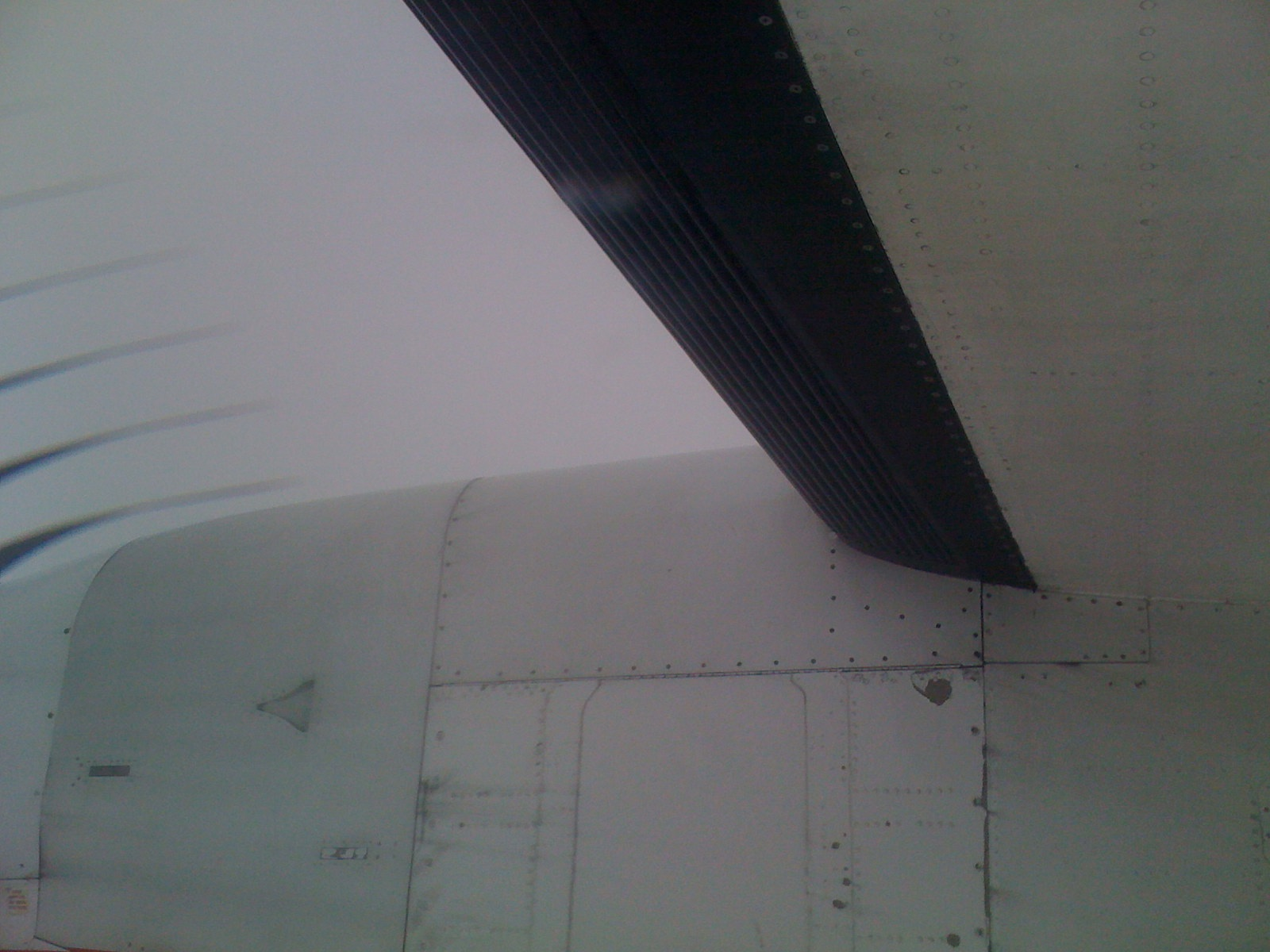
A deicing boot on the wing of a Dash 8 aircraft. The ridges are the result of the boot being inflated with air to crack and remove accumulated ice.

To protect an aircraft against icing in-flight, various forms of anti-icing or deicing are used:

- A common approach is to route engine "bleed air" into ducting along the leading edges of wings and tailplanes. The air heats the leading edge of the surface and this melts or evaporates ice on contact. On a turbine powered aircraft, air is extracted from the compressor section of the engine. If the aircraft is turbocharged piston powered, bleed air can be scavenged from the turbocharger.
- Some aircraft are equipped with pneumatic deicing boots that disperse ice build-up on the surface. These systems require less engine bleed air but are usually less effective than a heated surface.
- A few aircraft use a weeping wing system, which has hundreds of small holes in the leading edges and releases anti-icing fluid on demand to prevent the buildup of ice.
- Electrical heating is also used to protect aircraft and components (including propellers) against icing. The heating may be applied continuously (usually on small, critical, components, such as pitot static sensors and angle of attack vanes) or intermittently, giving an effect similar to the use of deicing boots.

In all these cases, usually only critical aircraft surfaces and components are protected. In particular, only the leading edge of a wing is usually protected.

Carburetor heat is applied to carbureted engines to prevent and clear icing. Fuel-injected engines are not susceptible to carburetor icing, but can suffer from blocked inlets. In these engines, an alternate air source is often available.

There is a difference between deicing and anti-icing. Deicing refers to the removal of ice from the airframe; anti-icing refers to the prevention of ice accumulating on the airframe.

== Related accidents and incidents ==
Date	Accident
15 October 1943	American Airlines Flight 63 (Flagship Missouri)
21 November 1973	Sólheimasandur US Navy C-117D crash
1 December 1974	Northwest Orient Airlines Flight 6231
4 December 1978	Rocky Mountain Airways Flight 217
13 January 1982	Air Florida Flight 90
12 December 1985	Arrow Air Flight 1285R
15 November 1987	Continental Airlines Flight 1713
10 March 1989	Air Ontario Flight 1363
26 December 1989	United Express Flight 2415
17 February 1991	Ryan International Airlines Flight 590
27 December 1991	Scandinavian Airlines System Flight 751
22 March 1992	USAir Flight 405
1 April 1993	Alan Kulwicki plane crash
31 October 1994	American Eagle Flight 4184
9 January 1997	Comair Flight 3272
27 February 2001	Loganair Flight 670
21 December 2002	TransAsia Airways Flight 791
21 November 2004	China Eastern Airlines Flight 5210
16 August 2005	West Caribbean Airways Flight 708
12 February 2009	Colgan Air Flight 3407
1 June 2009	Air France Flight 447
4 November 2010	Aero Caribbean Flight 883
9 January 2011	Iran Air Flight 277
18 May 2011	Sol Líneas Aéreas Flight 5428
24 July 2014	Air Algérie Flight 5017
11 February 2018	Saratov Airlines Flight 703
9 August 2024	Voepass Linhas Aéreas Flight 2283
1 November 2026	2026 Palm Beach County Learjet 60 crash (unconfirmed as of 2 November 2026)

== See also ==
- Accretion (meteorology)
- Category:Airliner accidents and incidents caused by ice
