= Comair Flight 3272 =

1997 aviation accident in Michigan

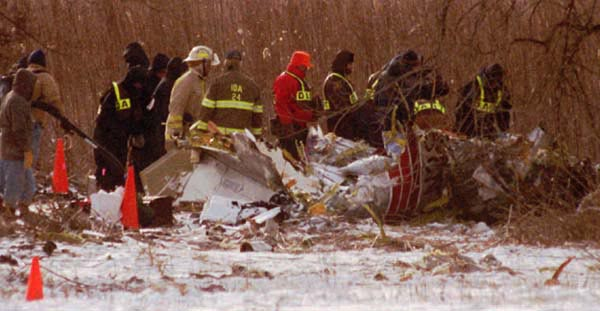
- Aircraft debris at the crash site

Accident
- Date: January 9, 1997
- Summary: Atmospheric icing leading to loss of control
- Site: Raisinville Township, near Dundee, Michigan, U.S.; 41°57′48.08″N 83°33′8.39″W

Aircraft
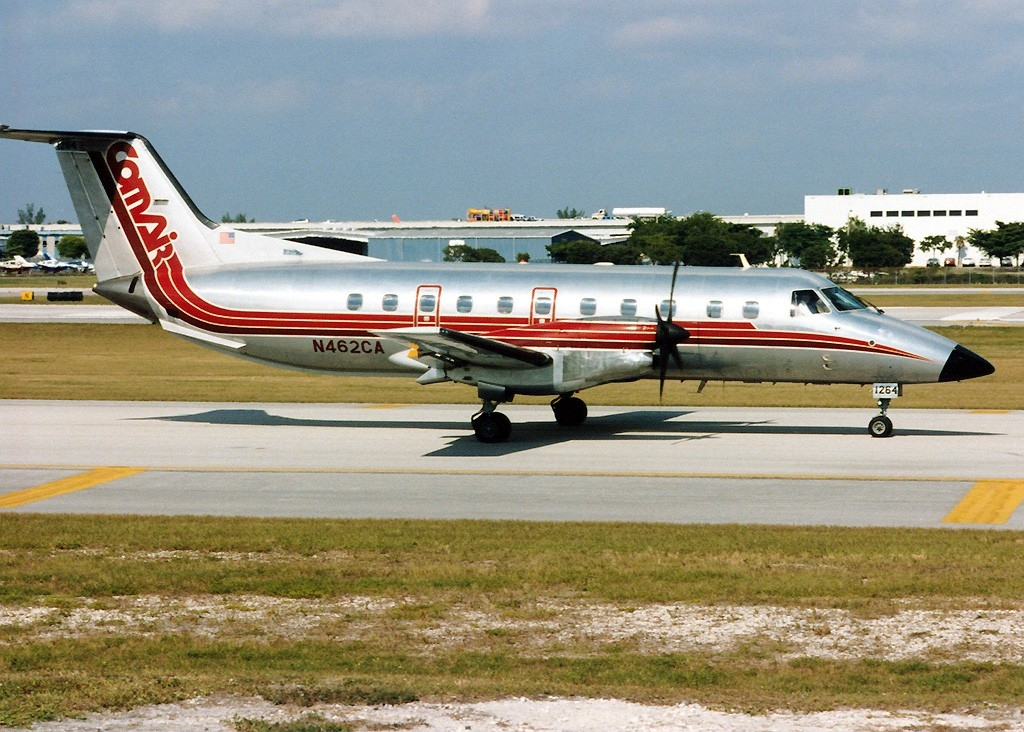
- A Comair Embraer EMB-120RT Brasilia, similar to the one involved in the accident
- Aircraft type: Embraer EMB-120RT Brasilia
- Operator: Comair on behalf of Delta Connection
- IATA flight No.: OH3272
- ICAO flight No.: COM3272
- Call sign: COMAIR 3272
- Registration: N265CA
- Flight origin: Cincinnati/Northern Kentucky International Airport
- Destination: Detroit Metropolitan Wayne County Airport
- Occupants: 29
- Passengers: 26
- Crew: 3
- Fatalities: 29
- Survivors: 0

Comair Flight 3272 was a scheduled domestic passenger flight operated by Comair from Cincinnati International Airport in Kentucky to Detroit Metropolitan Airport in Michigan. On January 9, 1997, at 15:54 EST, while on approach for landing, the Embraer EMB 120 Brasilia aircraft crashed nose-down 18 miles (29 km) southwest of Detroit Metropolitan Wayne County Airport, killing all 29 people on board.

The cause of the crash was determined to be inadequate and out-of-date flight crew procedures for icing conditions. Some of these originated with the Federal Aviation Administration's failure to specify suitable minimum airspeeds for icing conditions, while some were Comair procedure manual defects, including superseded instructions on the use of de-icing boots that did not follow the aircraft manufacturer's instructions.

== Aircraft ==
The aircraft involved was an Embraer EMB 120 Brasilia, MSN 120257, registered as N265CA, that was manufactured by Embraer in 1991. The aircraft logged 12,751 airframe hours and 12,735 takeoff and landing cycles and was equipped with two Pratt & Whitney Canada PW118 turboprops.

== Passengers and crew ==
There were 26 passengers and 3 crew members on this flight. The captain was Dann Carlsen, age 42, who was the pilot monitoring (PM). Carlsen had 5,329 flight hours, including 1,097 hours on the EMB-120. The first officer was Kenneth Reece, age 29, who was the pilot flying (PF) on Flight 3272. Reece had 2,582 flight hours, with 1,494 of them on the EMB-120. One of the passengers, Maureen DeMarco, was travelling to the funeral of her brother, Brian Scully, who had been killed the previous month on the crash of Airborne Express Flight 827.

== Accident ==
Flight 3272 took off from Cincinnati/Northern Kentucky International Airport at 14:53. Less than an hour later, the pilots began the approach to Detroit Metropolitan Wayne County Airport. The air traffic controller instructed the pilots to descend to 4,000 feet (1,220 m) and turn right on a heading of 180 degrees.

Comair Flight 3272 CVR recording

About 45 seconds later, the pilots were instructed to turn left onto a heading of 090 degrees to intercept the localizer. During the turn, Captain Carlsen made the statement "Yeah, looks like your low speed indicator," and asked First Officer Reece for increased power to the engines. Almost immediately, the aircraft abruptly stalled. It violently rolled 145 degrees to the left, to the right, and back to the left again. The pilots lost control, and Flight 3272 crashed into a rural field in Raisinville Township in Monroe County, killing all 29 aboard.

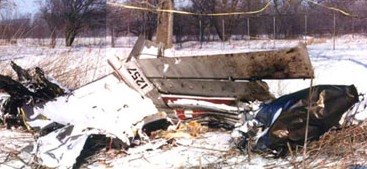
A section of the tail at the crash site

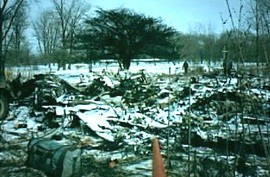
Scattered wreckage

== Aftermath ==
The National Transportation Safety Board very quickly noticed similarities between this accident and American Eagle Flight 4184. The NTSB determined that the probable cause was inadequate standards for icing operations while in flight, specifically the failure of the Federal Aviation Administration to establish adequate minimum airspeeds for icing conditions, leading to a loss of control when the airplane accumulated a thin, rough accretion of ice on its lifting surfaces.

A contributing factor was the crew's decision to operate in icing conditions while near the lower end of the flight envelope while the flaps were retracted. Comair had not established unambiguous minimum airspeed values for flap configurations and for flight in icing conditions. They also, against recommendation of the plane's manufacturer, failed to activate the deicing boots on the wings. This was because the Comair flight manual recommendation was in contravention of the manufacturers due to a concern over ice bridging, a concern held over from older planes that was no longer valid on newer planes like the EMB-120 Brasilia.

As the plane crash site is on private property, a memorial was built at the Roselawn Memorial Park in La Salle, Michigan, where unidentified remains of those killed in the crash are buried.

== Dramatization ==
The investigation into the crash was covered in "Deadly Myth", a 2017 episode of Mayday, a Canadian television series about air crashes.

== See also ==
- List of accidents and incidents involving commercial aircraft
- Aviation safety
