= Deicing boot =

Ice protection system installed on aircraft

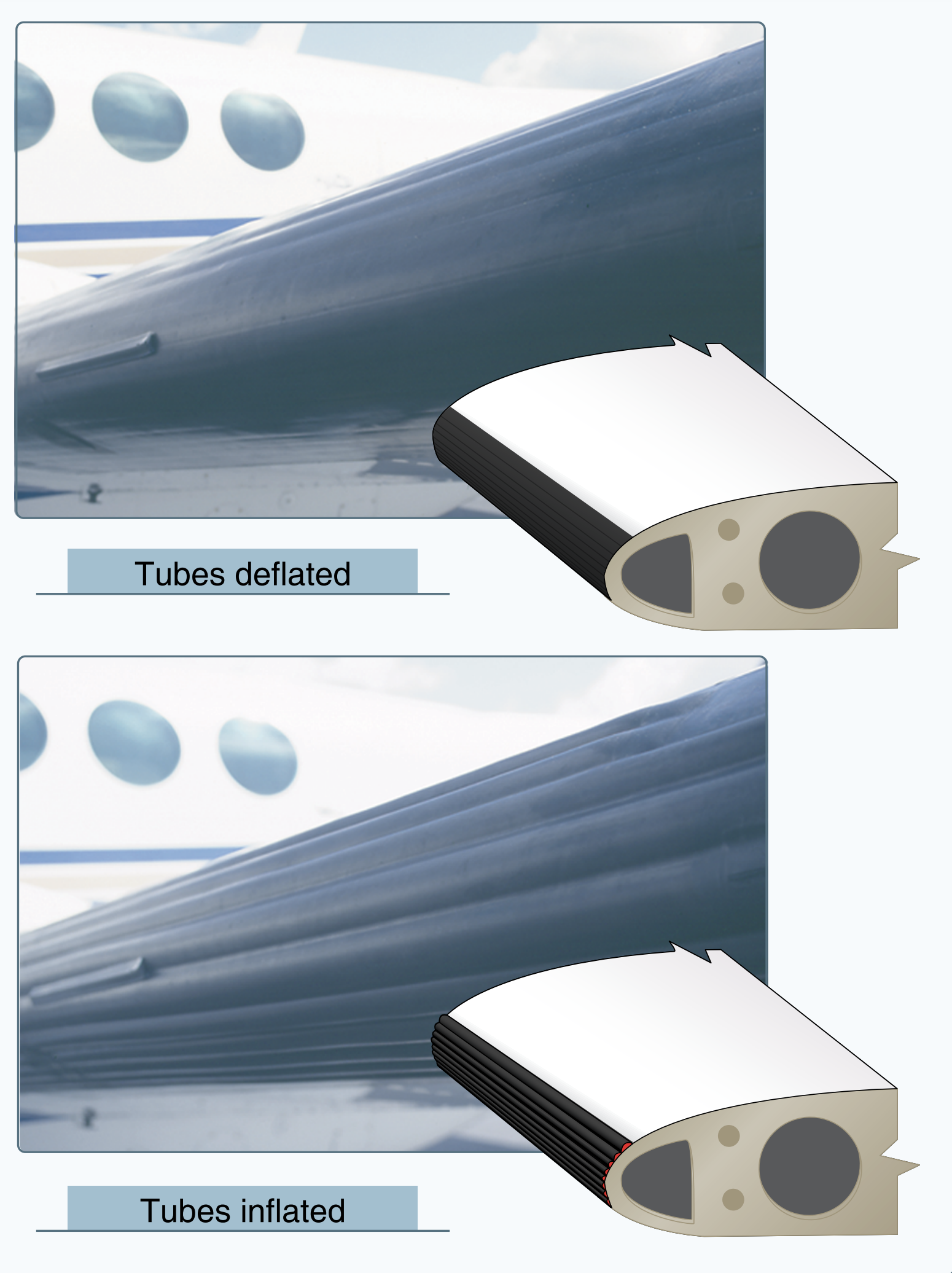
Operation of deicing boots

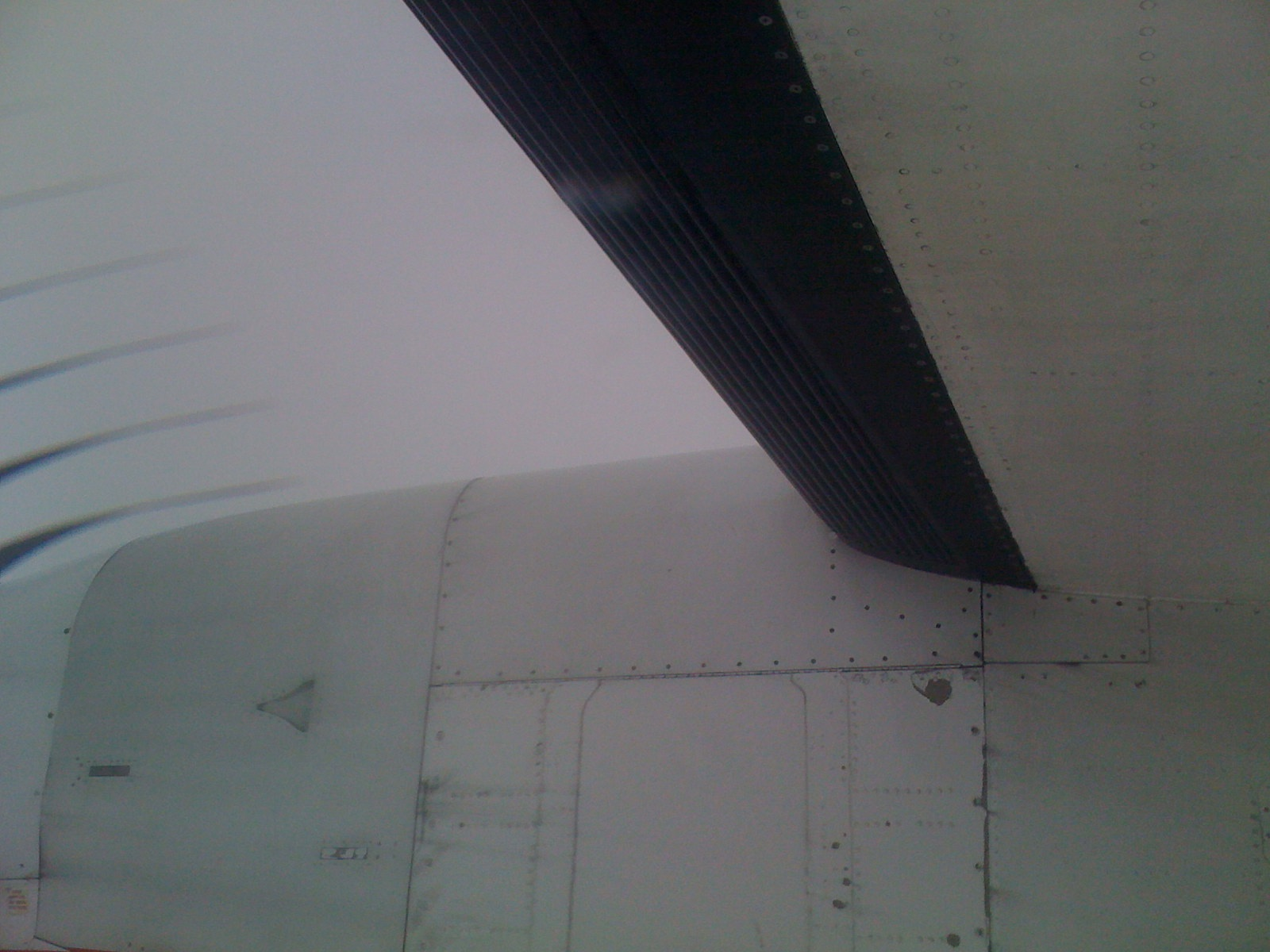
The black rubber deicing boot on the wing of a Bombardier Dash 8 Q400 passenger aircraft is inflated with air, producing ridges to crack and dislodge any accumulated ice.

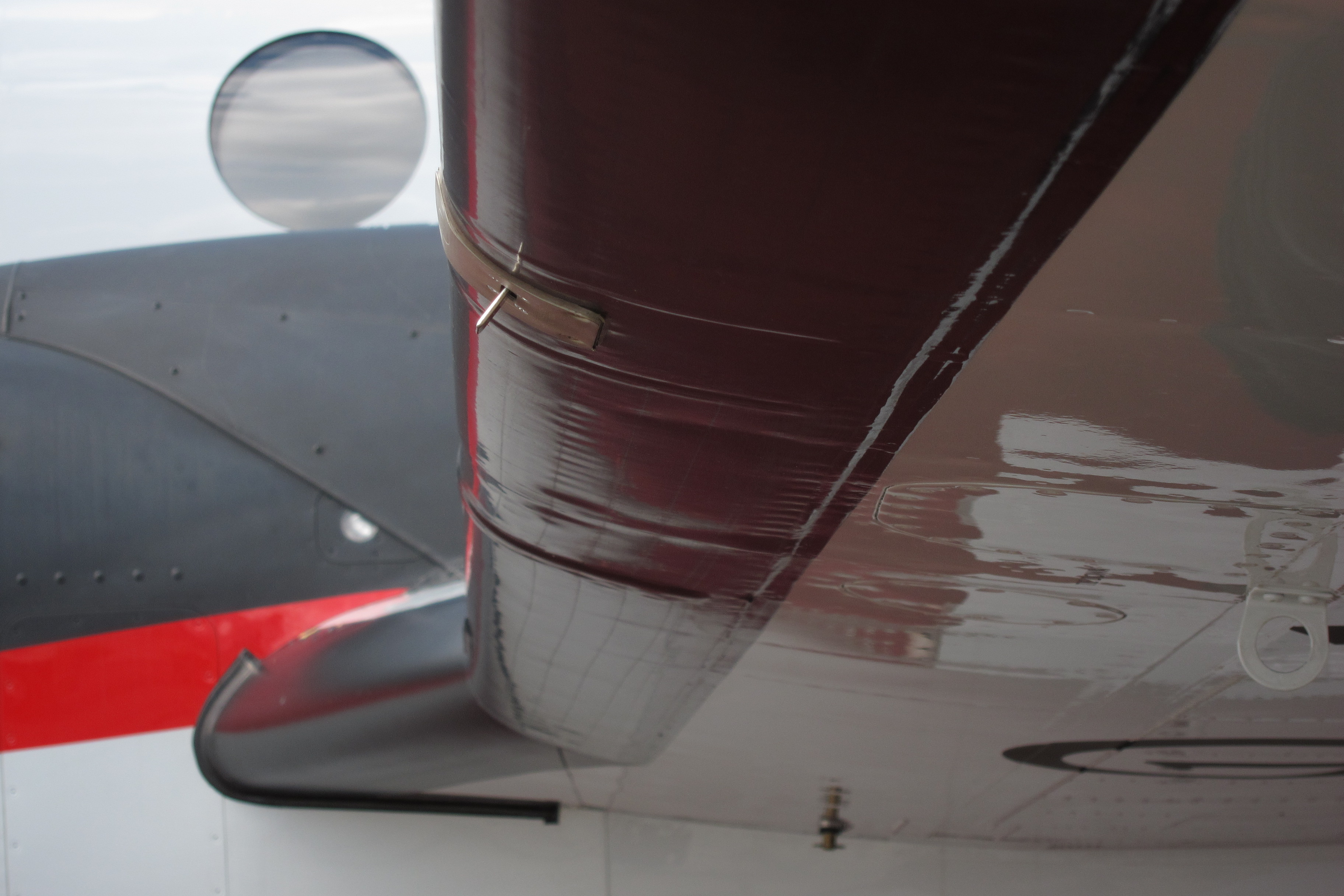
De-icing rubber boots on the wing leading edge of a Beechcraft 350

A deicing boot is a type of ice protection system installed on aircraft surfaces to permit a mechanical deicing in flight. Such boots are generally installed on the leading edges of wings and control surfaces (e.g. horizontal and vertical stabilizer) as these areas are most likely to accumulate ice which could severely affect the aircraft's performance.

== Design ==
A deicing boot consists of a thick rubber membrane that is installed over the surface to be deiced. As atmospheric icing occurs and ice builds up, a pneumatic system inflates the boot with compressed air. This expansion in size cracks any ice that has accumulated, and this ice is blown away into the airflow. The boots are then deflated to return the wing or surface to its optimal shape.

Boots require proper care. Holes in the boot may create air leaks that will decrease the effectiveness of the boots. As such, boots must be carefully inspected before each flight and any holes or cuts must be patched.

== History ==
Deicing boots were invented by the B.F. Goodrich Corporation in about 1929–1930 in Akron, Ohio. The work was begun by retired Ph.D chemist, William C. Geer. In its quest to develop deicing boots, the company built a large indoor facility in Akron to replicate bad weather and icing on aircraft wings.

== Alternatives ==
The use of deicing boots may enable an aircraft to be certified for flight into known icing conditions. However, they may not be sufficient to handle extremely severe icing, where ice can accumulate faster than the boots can shed it, or it accumulates on non-booted surfaces to the point where there is a dangerous loss of lift or control, or increase in weight.

Deicing boots are most commonly seen on medium-sized airliners and utility aircraft. Larger airliners and military jets tend to use heating systems within the wing, keeping it constantly warm and preventing ice from forming. Sources of heat include:

- Bleed air systems use high-temperature, compressed air from the engine compressor sections, and duct it towards the sections to be de-iced where it delivers its heat before being released into the airflow.
- Electrothermal systems pass electric current through resistive parts, usually the leading edges themselves. These systems require substantial electrical power and are generally used on large aircraft, such as the 787. Resistive deicing may also be applied to propeller and helicopter rotor blades.

== Ice bridging ==
'Ice bridging' is the theory that activating deicing boots early may lead to a condition where slushy ice is pushed into a hollow shell around the inflated boot, then freezes in place. This shell can then no longer be dislodged by any further operation of the boot. Bridging was described by the aviation writer Ernest Gann in his memoir Fate Is the Hunter.

The bridging theory is now disputed. In 2008 the NTSB issued an alert that pilots should, "activate boots as soon as the airplane enters icing conditions". Their claim was that bridging was "extremely rare, if it exists at all" and that there were no instances where it had led to an accident. Unwarranted fear of ice bridging contributed to the fatal crash of Comair Flight 3272.
