= M-130 (Michigan highway) =

Former state highway in Monroe County, Michigan, United States

M-130
- M-130 highlighted in red

Route information
- Maintained by MDOT
- Length: 9.095 mi (14.637 km)
- Existed: 1929–c. 1955

Major junctions
- West end: US 23 / M-50 in Raisinville Township
- East end: US 24 in Monroe

Location
- Country: United States
- State: Michigan
- Counties: Monroe

Highway system
- Michigan State Trunkline Highway System; Interstate; US; State; Byways
← M-129	→ US 131

M-130 was the designation of a former state trunkline highway in the southeastern corner of the US state of Michigan. It ran from a junction with US Highway 23/M-50 (US 23/M-50) northward across the River Raisin and then turned southeasterly along North Custer Road on the north side of the river to Monroe. The highway designation was commissioned in 1929 and used until 1955. M-130 had a spur route that was created in 1938 and lasted until the main highway was removed from the state highway system. Both highways are now under local control.

== Route description ==
Beginning at a junction with US 23/M-50 between Ida and Maybee, M-130 traveled northeasterly along Ida–Maybee Road across the River Raisin before turning southeast on North Custer Road. M-130 ran along the northern banks of the river passing. The highway terminated at US 24 in Monroe.

== History ==
M-130 was commissioned in 1929. At the time, US 23 followed Ida–Maybee Road, and M-130 followed North Custer Road from there to an intersection with US 24/US 25 (Telegraph Road) in Monroe. Later the next year, M-130 was extended southward from its western terminus when US 23 was rerouted to follow M-50. The highway was returned to local control in late 1955 or early 1956.

== Major intersections ==
The entire highway was in Monroe County.

Location	mi	km	Destinations	Notes
Raisinville Township	0.000	0.000	US 23 (South Custer Road) / M-50 – Ann Arbor, Toledo, Monroe	
Raisinville Township	1.617	2.602	Spur M-130 (North Custer Road)	Eastern terminus of spur
Monroe	9.095	14.637	US 24 (Telegraph Road) – Detroit, Toledo	
1.000 mi = 1.609 km; 1.000 km = 0.621 mi

== Spur route ==
Spur M-130
- Location: Raisinville Township
- Length: 1.138 mi (1.831 km)
- Existed: 1938–c. 1955

Spur M-130 was a spur route of M-130 which ran about 1.1 miles (1.8 km) along North Custer Road between Ida–Maybee and Muehleisen roads. Like the mainline M-130, the spur ran parallel to the River Raisin on the north banks of the river across from M-50. It was implemented in the middle of 1938, and returned to local control at the same time as the main highway in late 1955 or early 1956.
