= Dundee Community Schools =

School district in Michigan

Address
- 420 Ypsilanti Dundee, Monroe County, Michigan, 48131; United States
- Coordinates: 41°57′43″N 83°39′35″W

District information
- Type: Public
- Grades: Pre-Kindergarten-12
- Superintendent: Scott Leach
- Schools: 4
- Budget: $33,808,000 2022-2023 expenditures
- NCES District ID: 2612300

Students and staff
- Students: 1,752 (2024-2025)
- Teachers: 89.57 (on an FTE basis) (2024-2025)
- Staff: 203.31 FTE (2024-2025)
- Student–teacher ratio: 19.56 (2024-2025)
- District mascot: Viking
- Colors: Blue & white

Other information
- Website: www.dundeecommunityschools.org

Dundee Community Schools is a public school district in Monroe County, Michigan. It serves Dundee, part of Maybee, and parts of the townships of Dundee, Exeter London, Milan, and Raisinville.

== History ==
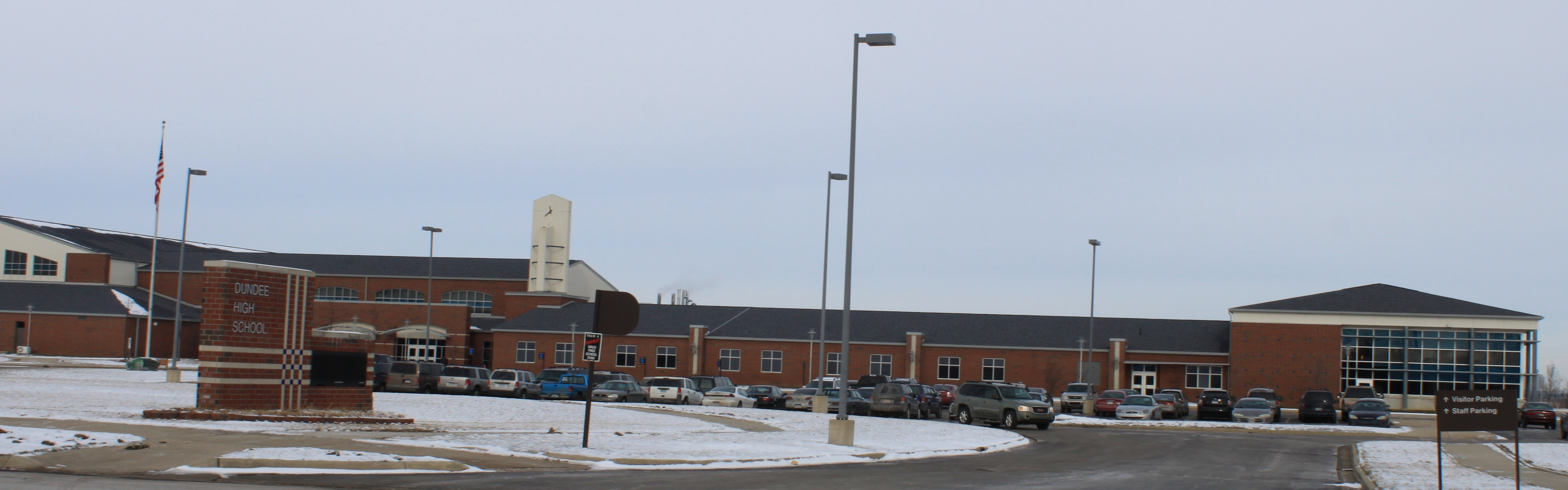
Dundee High School

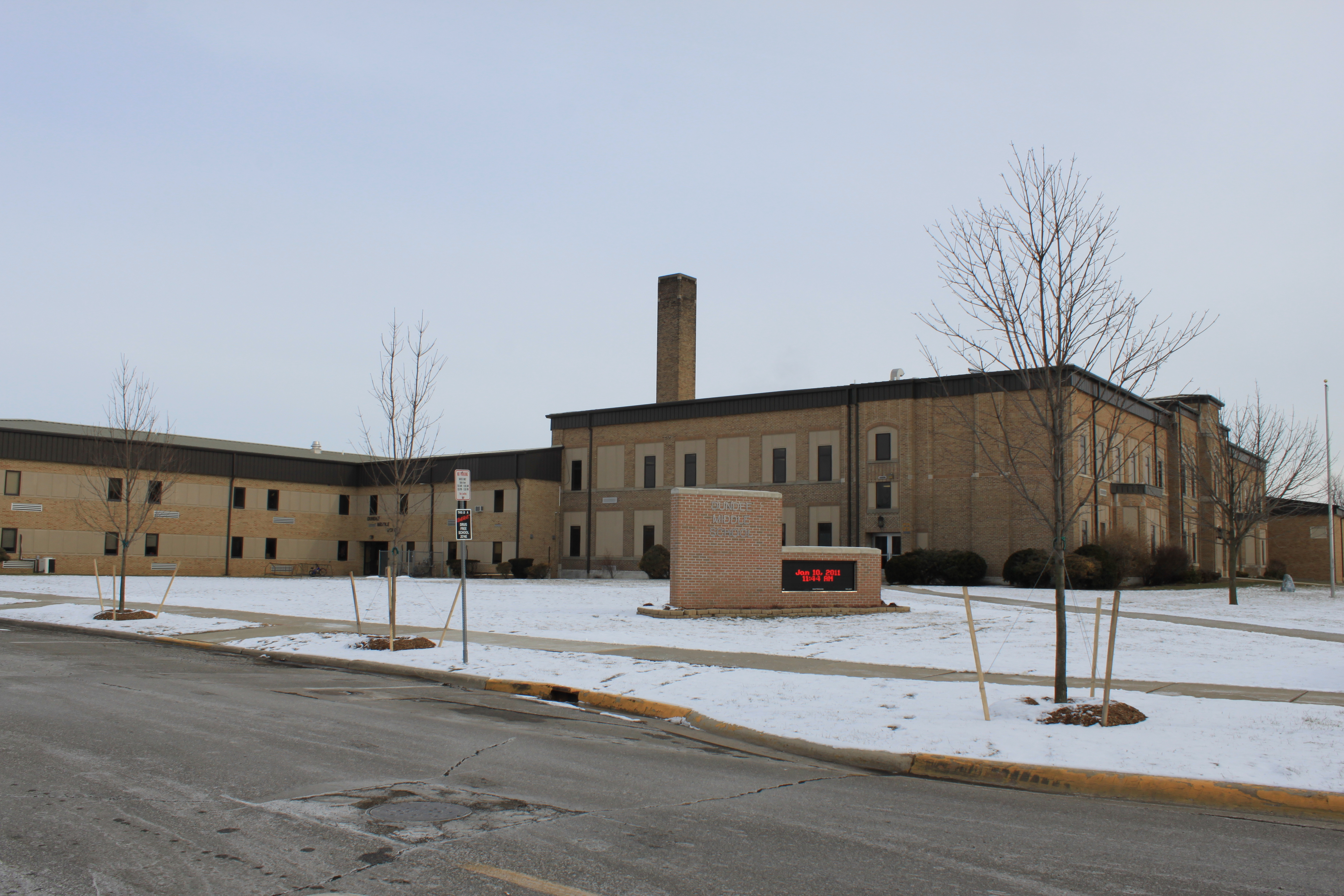
Dundee Middle School (former high school, until 2003)

Dundee's Union School building opened in fall 1884. On March 5, 1929, it burned down due to spontaneous combustion in the bin of coal used to heat the building. The district immediately set to replacing it. The rebuilt school served as the high school until the current Dundee High School opened in fall 2003. It then became the district's middle school.

== Schools ==
Schools in Dundee Community Schools district
School	Address	Notes
Dundee High School	130 Viking Drive, Dundee	Grades 9-12
Dundee Middle School	420 Ypsilanti Drive, Dundee	Grades 5-8
Dundee Elementary School	420 Ypsilanti Drive, Dundee	Grades PreK-4
Riverside Academy	445 Toledo Street Dundee	Grades 9-12. Alternative school.

=== Athletics ===
Dundee Schools are most known for their wrestling program. Dundee High School wrestling has been a top program in the state of Michigan since 1995, when they won the first of four consecutive Division 4 state wrestling championships, leading to a historic performance in 2000–2001, when the Vikings were said to be the best team in the state of Michigan in all divisions. In 2002–03 the Vikings moved into Division 3 with the growth of the school district, and continued the success they had in Division 4. The Dundee Vikings Wrestling team has won 14 MHSAA State Championships, winning states in 1995, 1996, 1997, 1998, 2001, 2007, 2013, 2014, 2016, 2018, 2019, 2020, 2021, and 2022. In addition to the team success, Dundee has also produced many individual state wrestling champions. Their head coach, Tim Roberts, was named the NWCA National High School Wrestling coach of the year in 2020.
