= TKS (disambiguation) =

TKS may refer to:

== Places ==
- Turks and Caicos Islands, the country's ISO 3166-1 alpha-3-code
- TKS, IATA code for Tokushima Airport, an airport serving Tokushima, Japan

== Vehicles and transportation ==
- TKS, Polish tankettes during the Second World War
- TKS spacecraft, Soviet spacecraft
- TKS Ice Protection system, fluid-based airborne ice protection system
- TKS (company), the company producing the TKS ice protection system

== Other uses ==
- 3,5,7-Trioxododecanoyl-CoA synthase, an enzyme
- Taijin kyofusho syndromes, a Japanese form of social phobia
- The TESS-Keck Survey, an exoplanet search project
- The Kryptonite Sparks, Romanian indie rock band

== See also ==
- TK (disambiguation), for the singular of TKs
