= Masoud Farzaneh =

Canadian electrical engineer

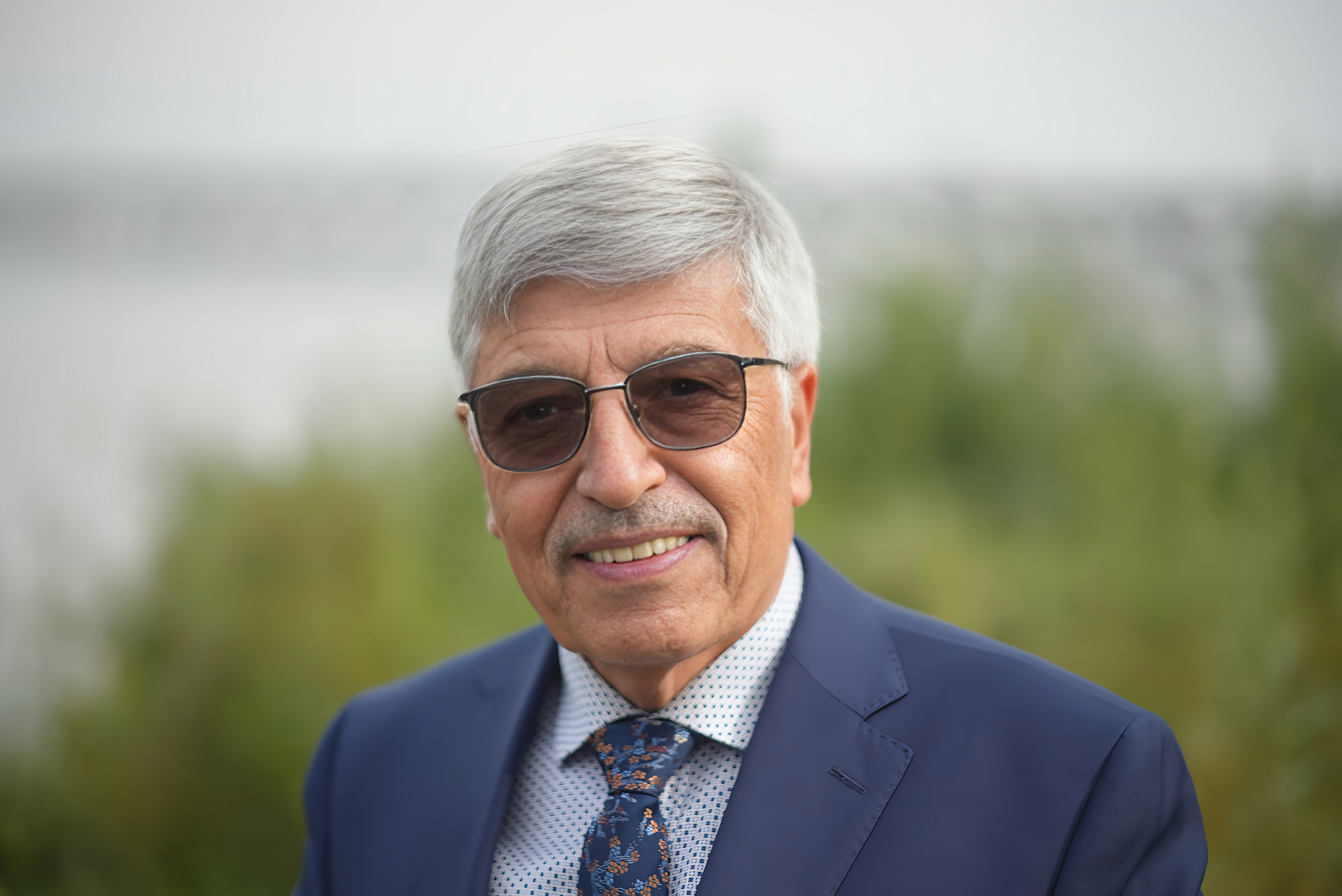
- Education: Amirkabir University of Technology (BEng); National Polytechnic Institute of Toulouse (MEng, PhD); Paul Sabatier University (MEng, PhD)
- Occupations: Electrical engineer, academic
- Website: www.masoudfarzaneh.ca

Masoud Farzaneh is an electrical engineer and professor emeritus at the Université du Québec à Chicoutimi (UQAC) known for his research on atmospheric icing and its effects on electrical power networks in cold climates.

== Education and research ==
Farzaneh graduated from Tehran Polytechnic in 1973. He obtained a master degree at National Polytechnic Institute of Toulouse and Université Paul Sabatier in France, where he also received a PhD in 1986.

Farzaneh is known for its pioneering research on high-voltage engineering. His research focused on: "impact of pollution and cold climate on overhead power network equipment; corona-induced vibration; partial and arc discharge on iced and polluted insulators; and de-icing techniques and self-cleaning and icephobic coatings for power networks."

He founded the International Research Centre on Atmospheric Icing and Engineering of Power Networks (CENGIVRE).

== Recognition ==
Farzaneh has been elected a fellow of multiple professional bodies, including the IEEE, IET, CIGRE, the Canadian Academy of Engineering, and the Royal Society of Canada. and a Life Fellow of the Institute of Electrical and Electronics Engineers (IEEE).

He has served as president of the IEEE Dielectrics and Electrical Insulation Society. In recognition of his contributions, UQAC established the Masoud Farzaneh Award.

== Selected publications ==
- Farzaneh, M. (ed.). Atmospheric Icing of Power Networks. Springer, 2008. ISBN 978-1-4020-8530-7
- Farzaneh, M.; Chisholm, W.A. Insulators for Icing and Polluted Environments. IEEE Press/Wiley, 2009.
