= Graupel =

Precipitation that forms when supercooled droplets of water freeze on a falling snowflake

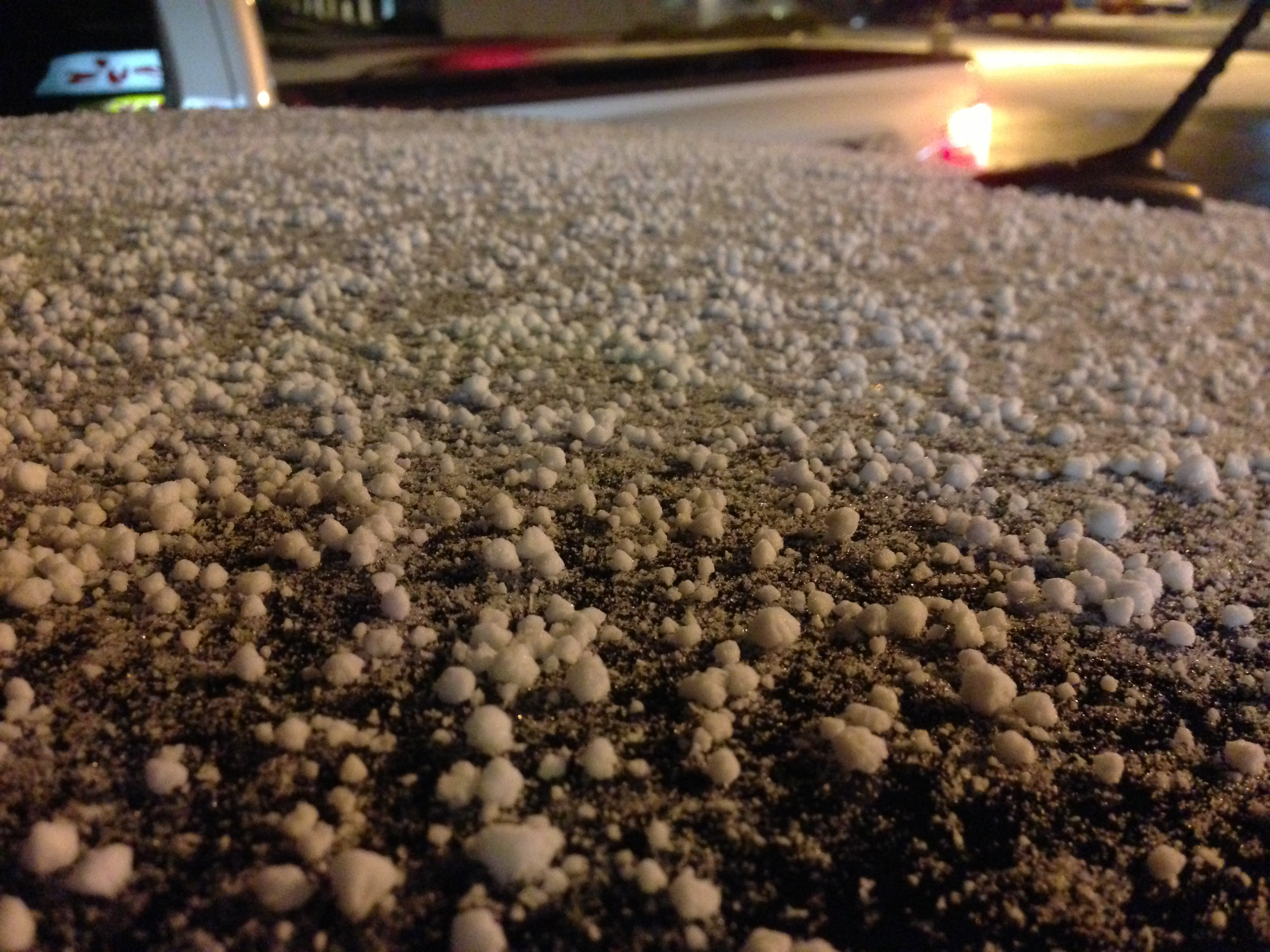
Graupel pellets in the morning, having fallen the previous day

Graupel (/ˈɡraʊpəl/; German: [ˈɡʁaʊpl̩]), also called soft hail, hominy snow, granular snow, snow pellets or popcorn snow, is precipitation that forms when supercooled water droplets in air are collected and freeze on falling snowflakes, forming 2–5 mm (0.08–0.20 in) balls of crisp, opaque rime.

Graupel is distinct from hail and ice pellets in both formation and appearance. However, both hail and graupel are common in thunderstorms with cumulonimbus clouds, though graupel also falls in winter storms, and at higher elevations as well. The METAR code for graupel is GS.

== Formation ==
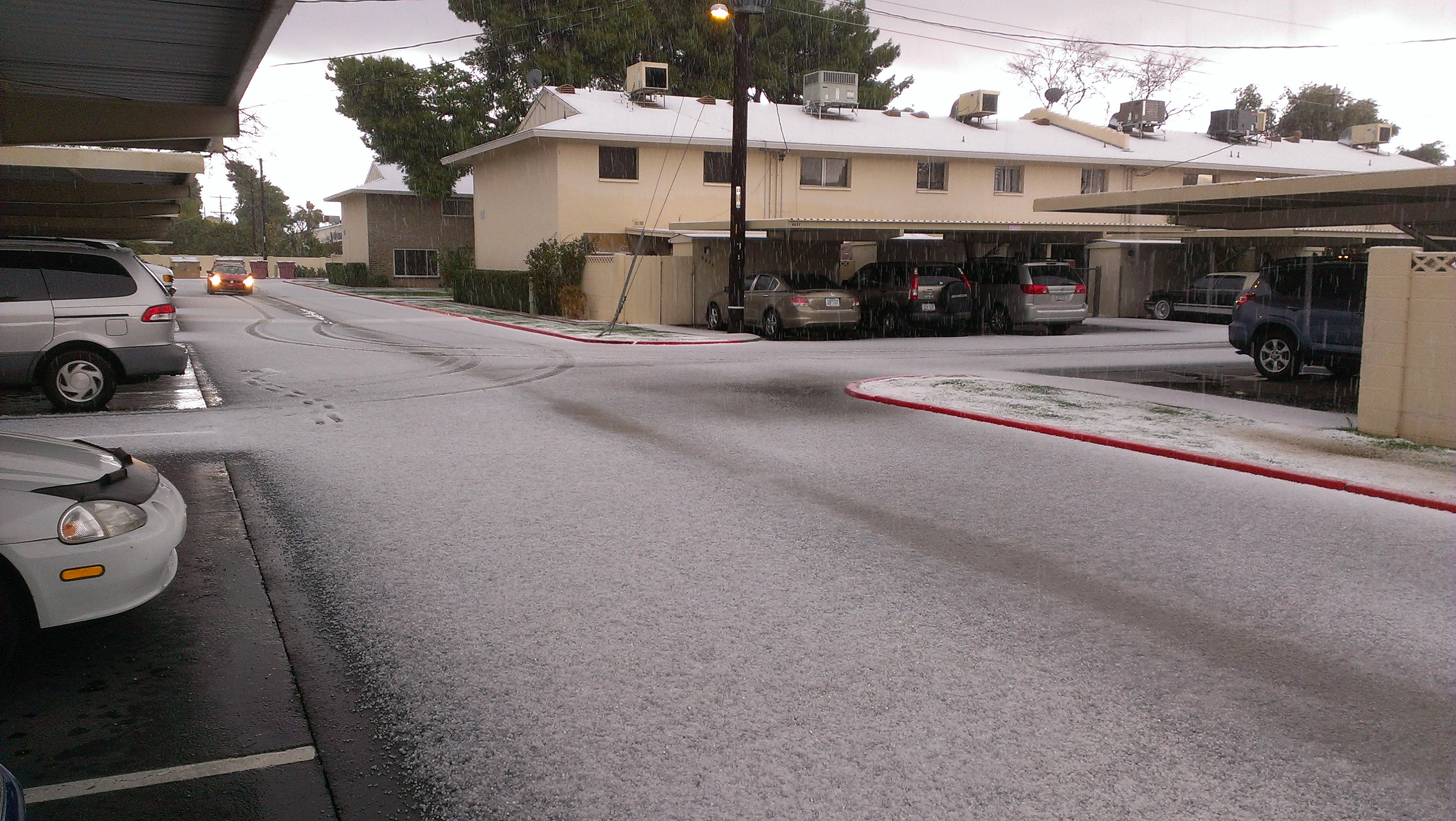
Falling graupel

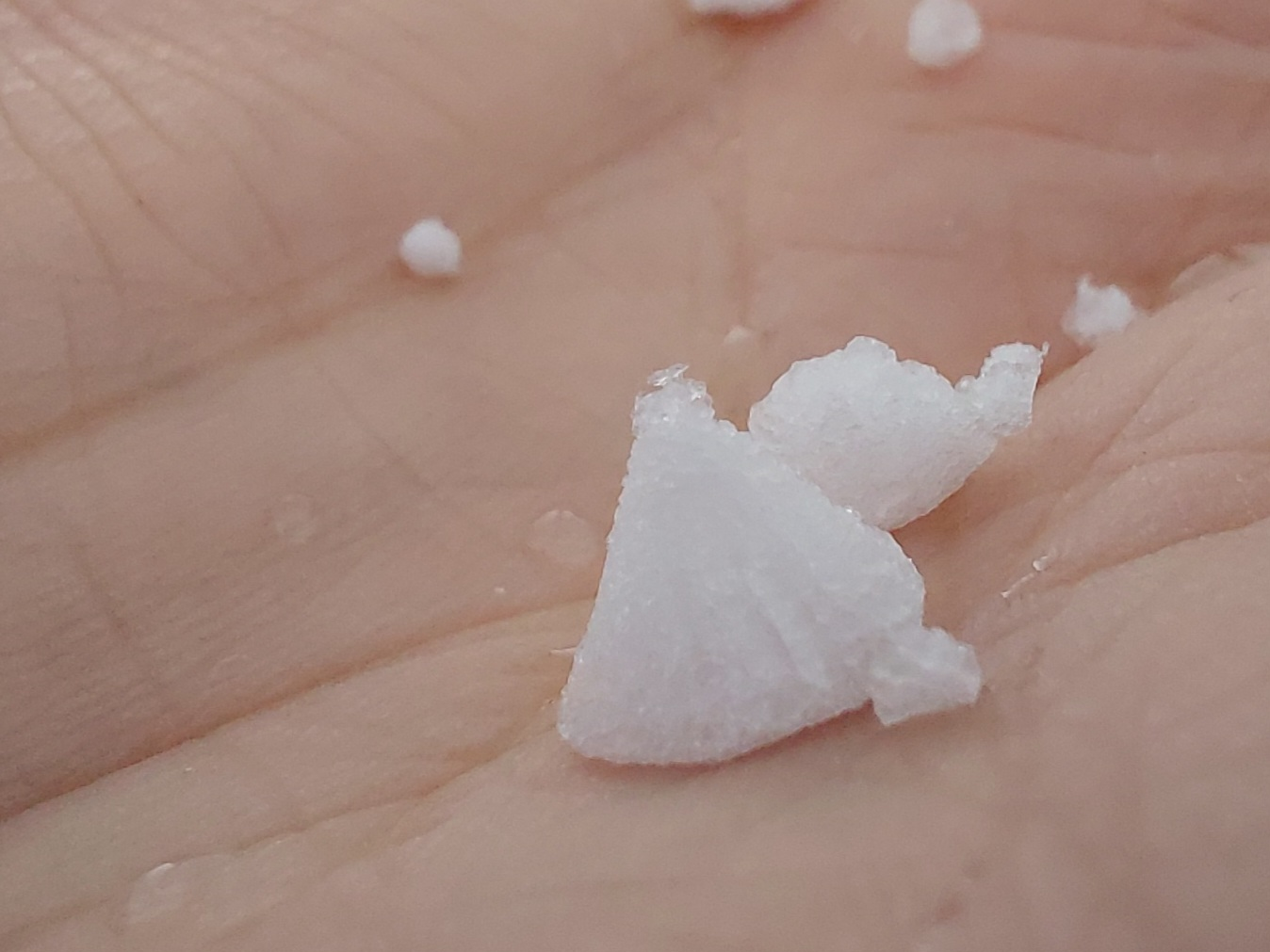
Conical graupel particle

Under some atmospheric conditions, snow crystals may encounter supercooled water droplets. These droplets, which have a diameter of about 10 μm (0.00039 in) on average, can exist in the liquid state at temperatures as low as −40 °C (−40 °F), far below the normal freezing point as long as it is above the homogeneous nucleation point of water. Contact between a snow crystal and the supercooled droplets results in freezing of the liquid droplets onto the surface of the crystal. This process of crystal growth is known as accretion. Crystals that exhibit frozen droplets on their surfaces are often referred to as rimed. When this process continues so that the shape of the original snow crystal is no longer identifiable and has become ball-like, the resulting crystal is referred to as graupel.

As graupel falls, it often deforms into a conical shape. This conical shape, in turn, determines which direction it falls and how far it travels as it falls. Small graupel particles with a base diameter less than 1 mm generally fall with the conical base down, but if the particle is between 1 mm and 3 mm persistent oscillations around the center of the conical base appear, and if larger than 3 mm the graupel particle will start to tumble. As its base diameter increases, a conical graupel particle generally falls further horizontally from where it initially fell.

Graupel was formerly referred to by meteorologists as "soft hail". Graupel is distinguishable from true hail in both the shape and strength of the pellet and, in some cases, the circumstances in which it falls. Ice from hail is formed in hard, relatively uniform layers and usually falls only during thunderstorms. Graupel forms fragile, soft, oblong crystals and falls in place of typical snowflakes in wintry mix situations, often in concert with ice pellets. However, graupel does also occur in thunderstorms. Graupel is also fragile enough that it will typically fall apart when pressed on.

== Microscopic structure ==
The frozen droplets on the surface of rimed crystals are difficult to see even when zoomed in, and the topography of a graupel particle is not easy to record with a light microscope because of the limited resolution and depth of field in the instrument.

However, observations of snow crystals with a low-temperature scanning electron microscope (LT-SEM) clearly show frozen cloud droplets measuring up to 50 μm (0.002 in) on the surface of the crystals. The rime has been observed on all four basic forms of snow crystals, including plates, dendrites, columns and needles. As the riming process continues, the mass of frozen, accumulated cloud droplets eventually obscures the form of the original snow crystal, thereby giving rise to graupel.

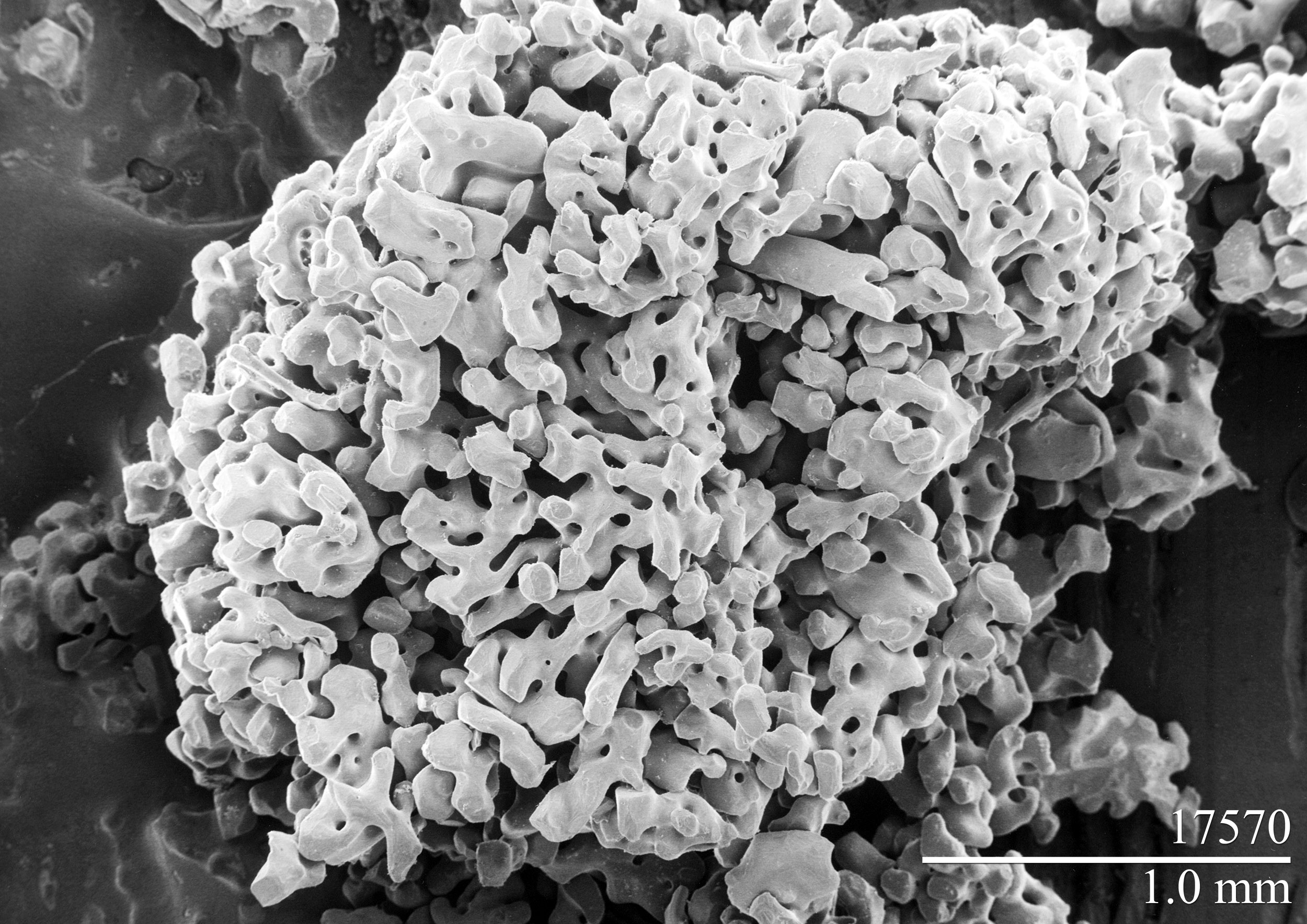
Graupel encasing and hiding a snow crystal from view

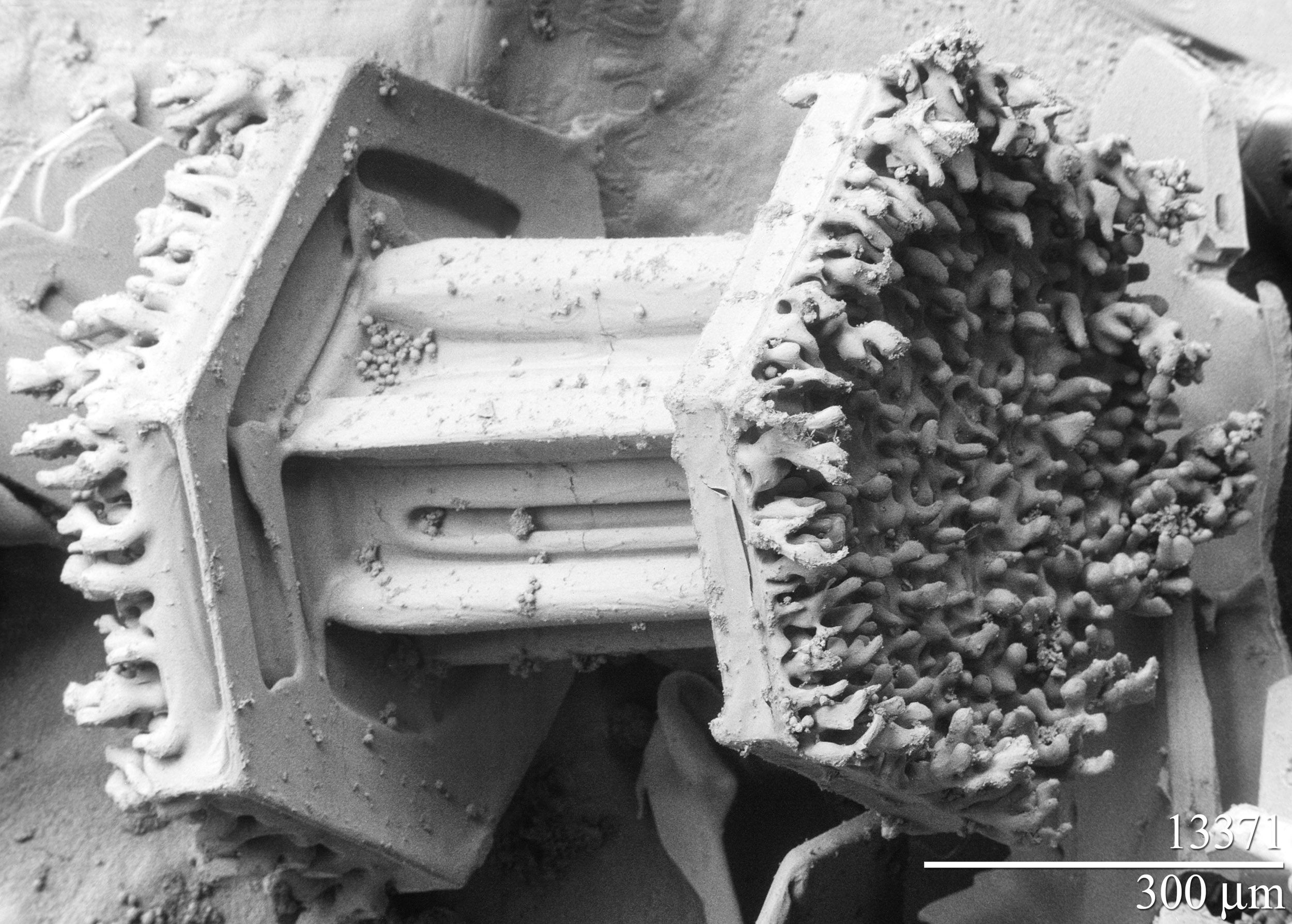
Rime on both ends of a columnar snow crystal

== Graupel and avalanches ==
Graupel commonly forms in high-altitude climates and is both denser and more granular than ordinary snow, due to its rimed exterior. Macroscopically, graupel resembles small beads of polystyrene. The combination of density and low viscosity makes fresh layers of graupel unstable on slopes, and layers of 20–30 cm (8–12 in) or higher present a high risk of dangerous slab avalanches. In addition, thinner layers of graupel falling at low temperatures can act as ball bearings below subsequent falls of more naturally stable snow, rendering them also liable to avalanche or otherwise making surfaces slippery. Graupel tends to compact and stabilise ("weld") approximately one or two days after falling, depending on the temperature and the properties of the graupel.

== Gallery ==
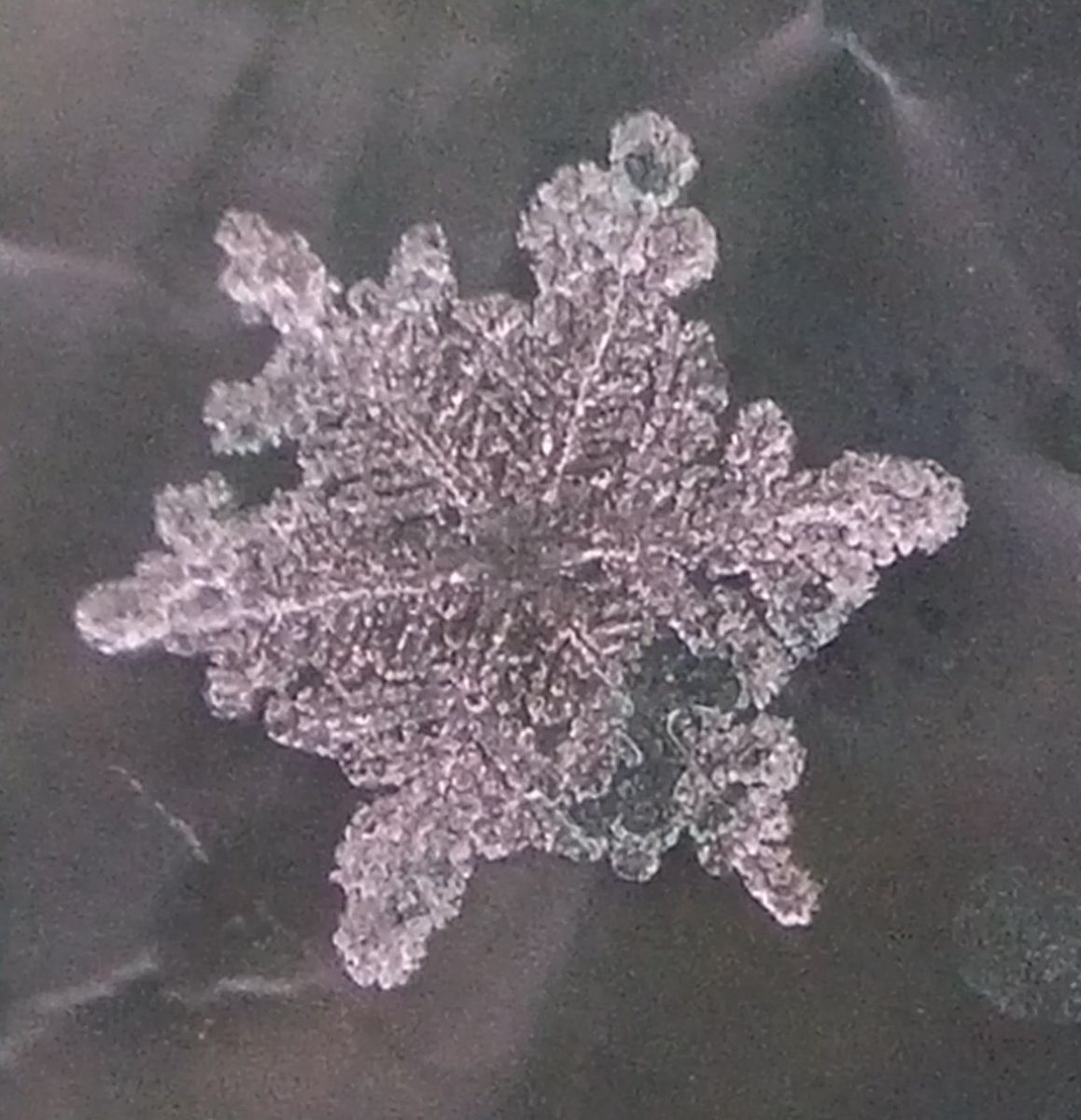
Snowflakes can turn into graupel.

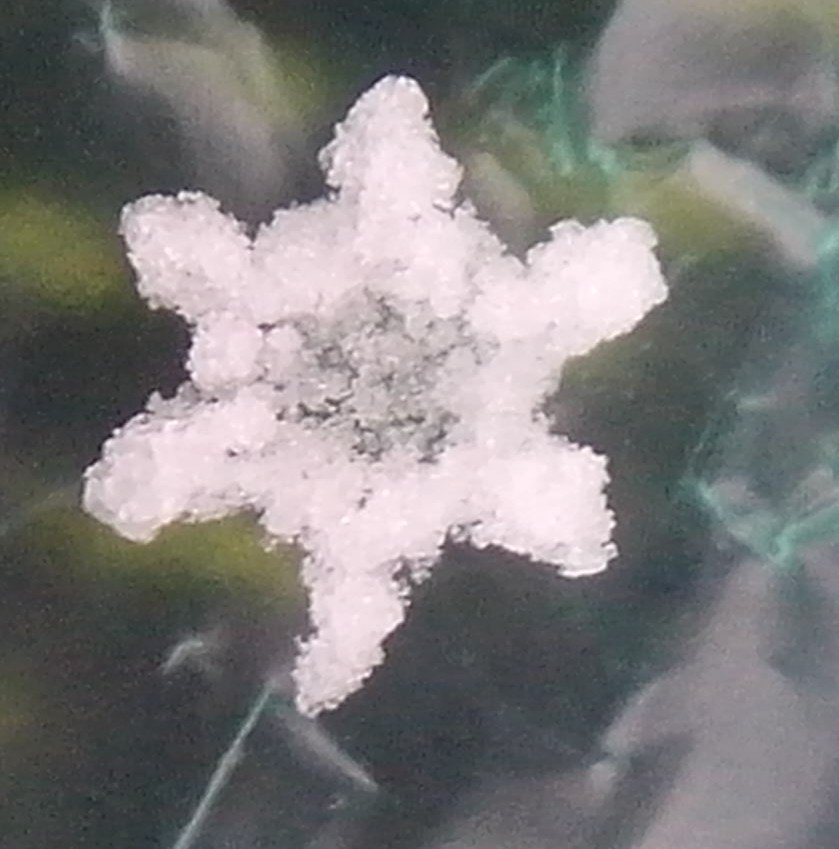
Almost graupel

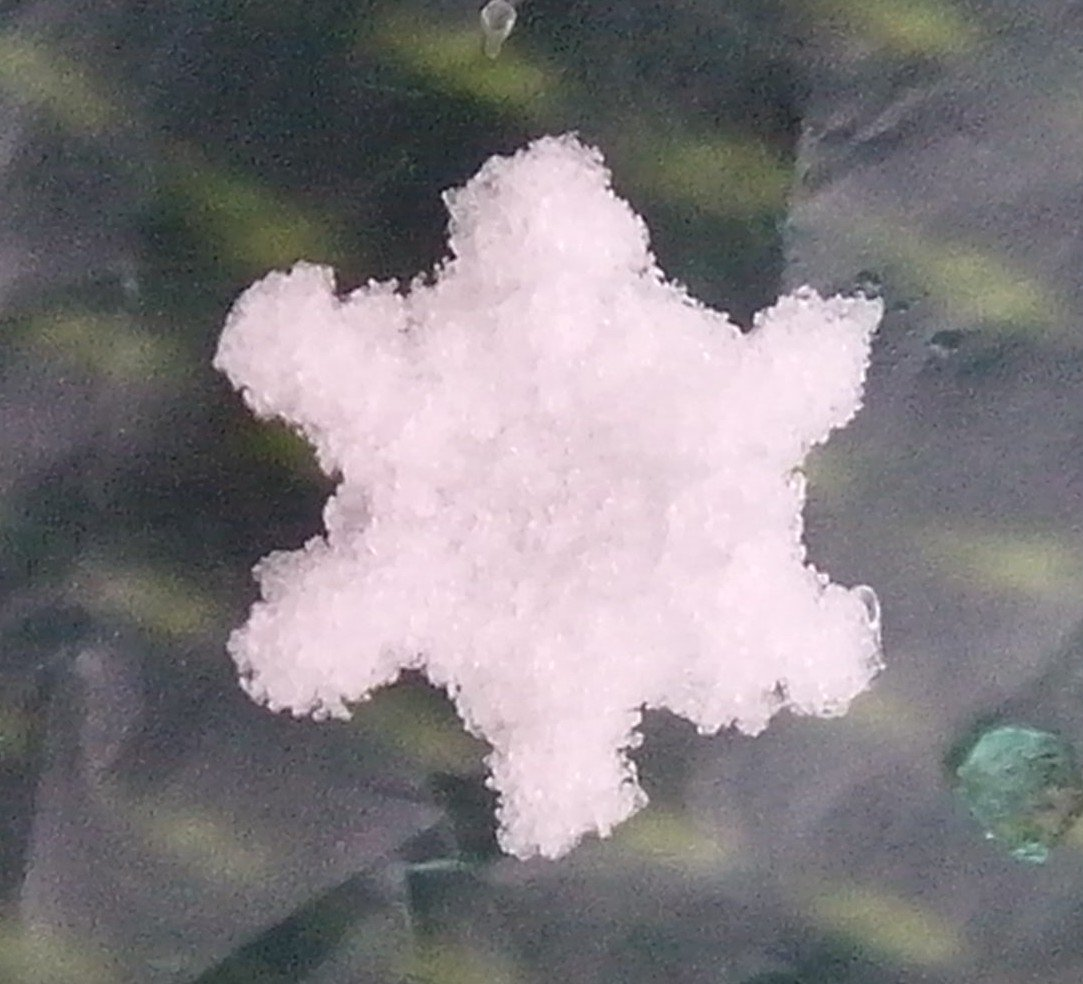
Graupel in shape of snowflake

== See also ==
- Freezing rain
- Rimed snow
- Sleet – term variously used for frozen precipitation
