= Accretion =

Accretion may refer to:

== Science ==
- Accretion (astrophysics), the formation of planets and other bodies by collection of material through gravity
- Accretion (meteorology), the process by which water vapor in clouds forms water droplets around nucleation sites
- Accretion (coastal management), the process where coastal sediments return to the visible portion of the beach following storm erosion
- Accretion (geology), the increase in size of a tectonic plate by addition of material along a convergent boundary

- Accretionary wedge

== Other uses ==
- Accretion (finance), predictable changes in the price of certain securities
