= Atmospheric icing =

Weather condition in which water droplets freeze onto objects they come in contact with

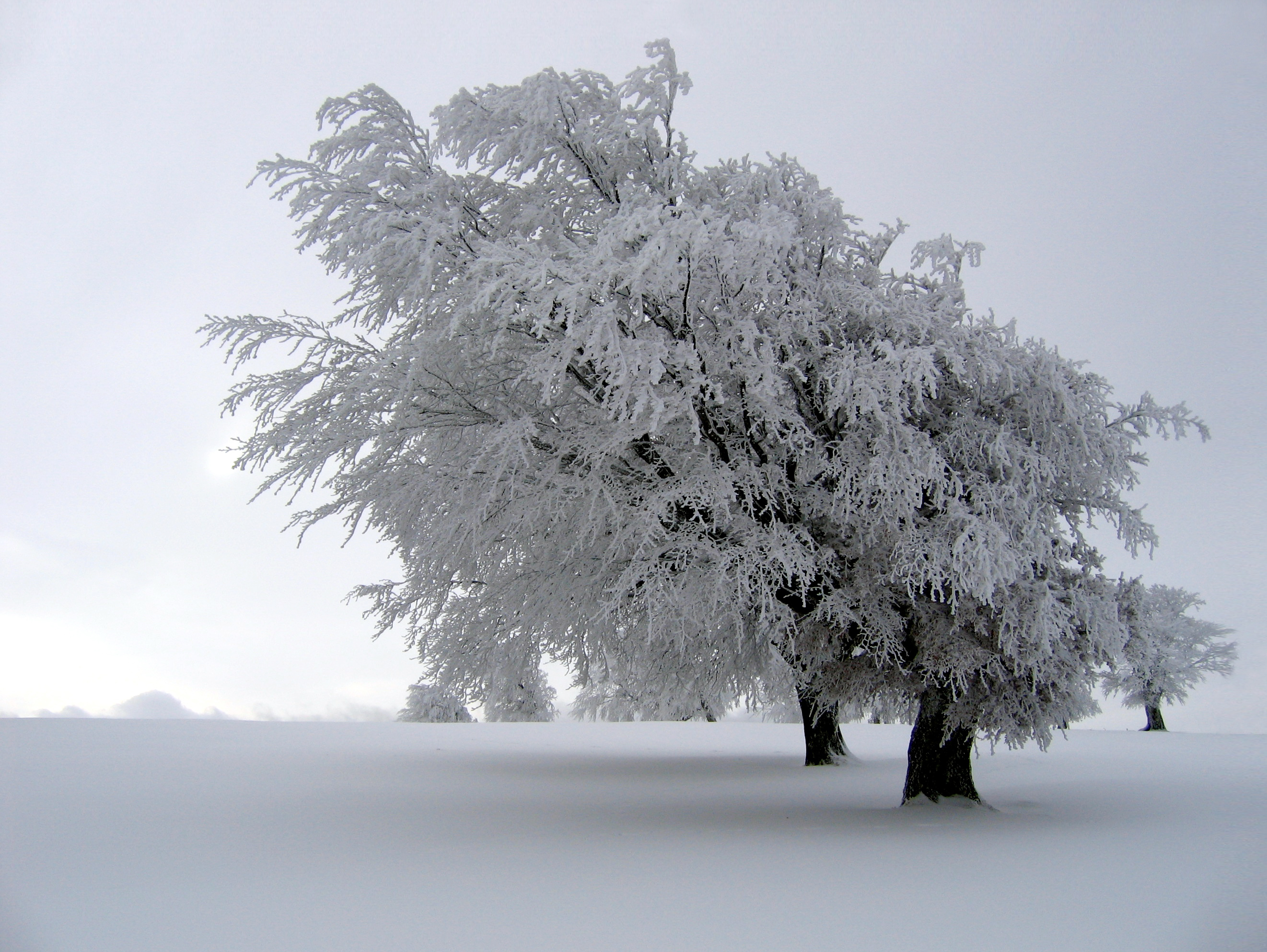
The effect of atmospheric icing on a tree in the Black Forest of Germany

Atmospheric icing occurs in the atmosphere when water droplets suspended in air freeze on objects they come in contact with. It is not the same as freezing rain, which is caused directly by precipitation.

Atmospheric icing occurs on aircraft, towers, wind turbines, boats, oil rigs, and trees. Unmanned aircraft are particularly sensitive to icing. In cold climates, particularly those at higher elevations, atmospheric icing is common in winter as elevated terrain interacts with supercooled clouds that can cause icing on contact. Ice loads are a major cause of catastrophic failures of overhead electrical power lines, as power lines can break under the weight of accumulated ice. Therefore, estimation of maximum potential ice load is crucial in the structural design of power line systems to withstand ice loads, and this can be done with numerical icing models and examples that include meteorological data.

== Formation ==
Water does not always freeze at 0 °C (32 °F). Water that persists in liquid state below this temperature is said to be supercooled, and supercooled water droplets cause icing on aircraft. Below −20 °C (−4 °F), icing is rare because clouds at these temperatures usually consist of ice particles rather than supercooled water droplets. Below −48 °C (−54 °F), supercooled water always freezes; therefore, icing is impossible under these circumstances.

== In aviation ==
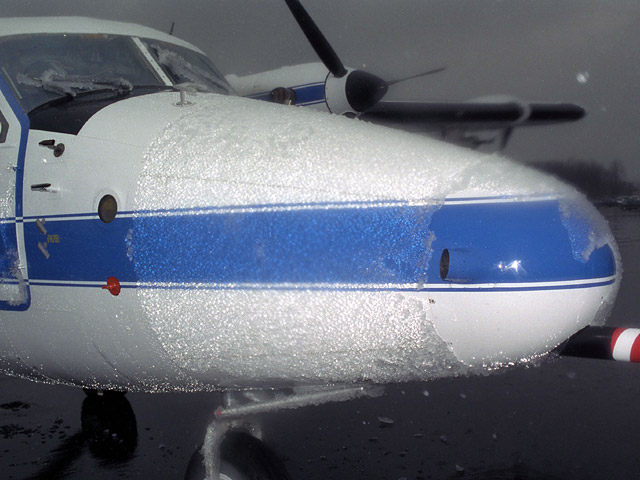
Ice contamination as a result of encountering supercooled large droplet (SLD) conditions

Icing conditions can be particularly dangerous to aircraft, as the built-up ice changes the aerodynamics of the flight surfaces and airframe and results in structural icing, which can increase the risk of a stall and potentially accidents.

There are three types of structural icing: rime icing, clear (or glaze) icing, and mixed icing. Rime ice is rough, milky, and opaque. It forms rapidly from small supercooled water droplets and is the most reported icing type. Colder temperatures, lower liquid water content, and small droplets favors the forming of rime icing. Clear ice is glossy, clear, or translucent. Compared to rime ice, clear ice forms relatively slowly and tends to appear with warmer temperatures, higher liquid water contents, and larger droplets. Mixed ice is a mixture of rime and clear ice.

The structural icing of an aircraft is largely determined by three factors: supercooled liquid water content, which decides how much water is available for icing; air temperature, with half of all reported icing occurring between −8 °C (18 °F) and −12 °C (10 °F); and droplet size, with small droplets influencing aircraft's leading edges and large droplets can impact further aft of the airfoil. Airspeed influence the icing too. In general, the faster the speed, the more ice accumulation. However, this is counteracted by airframe skin surface at higher airspeed, and as a result, structural icing is minimal when speed is above 575 kn (1,100 km/h; 660 mph). Additionally, the design of the aircraft will also influence the icing.

In stratiform clouds, icing is more mild. It generally form as rime or mixed icing and tends to be confined in a 3,000–4,000 ft (910–1,200 m) thick layer. In contrast, icing intensity level in cumuliform clouds may range from trace for small cumulus to severe for large ones in the form of clear or mixed icing in the upper levels and can extend to great heights.

To ensure flight safety, on-board ice protection systems have been developed on aircraft intended to fly through these conditions.

== See also ==
- Condensation
- Frost
- Hard rime
- Soft rime
- Icing (nautical)
