= Rain and snow mixed =

Form of precipitation consisting of rain and melting snow

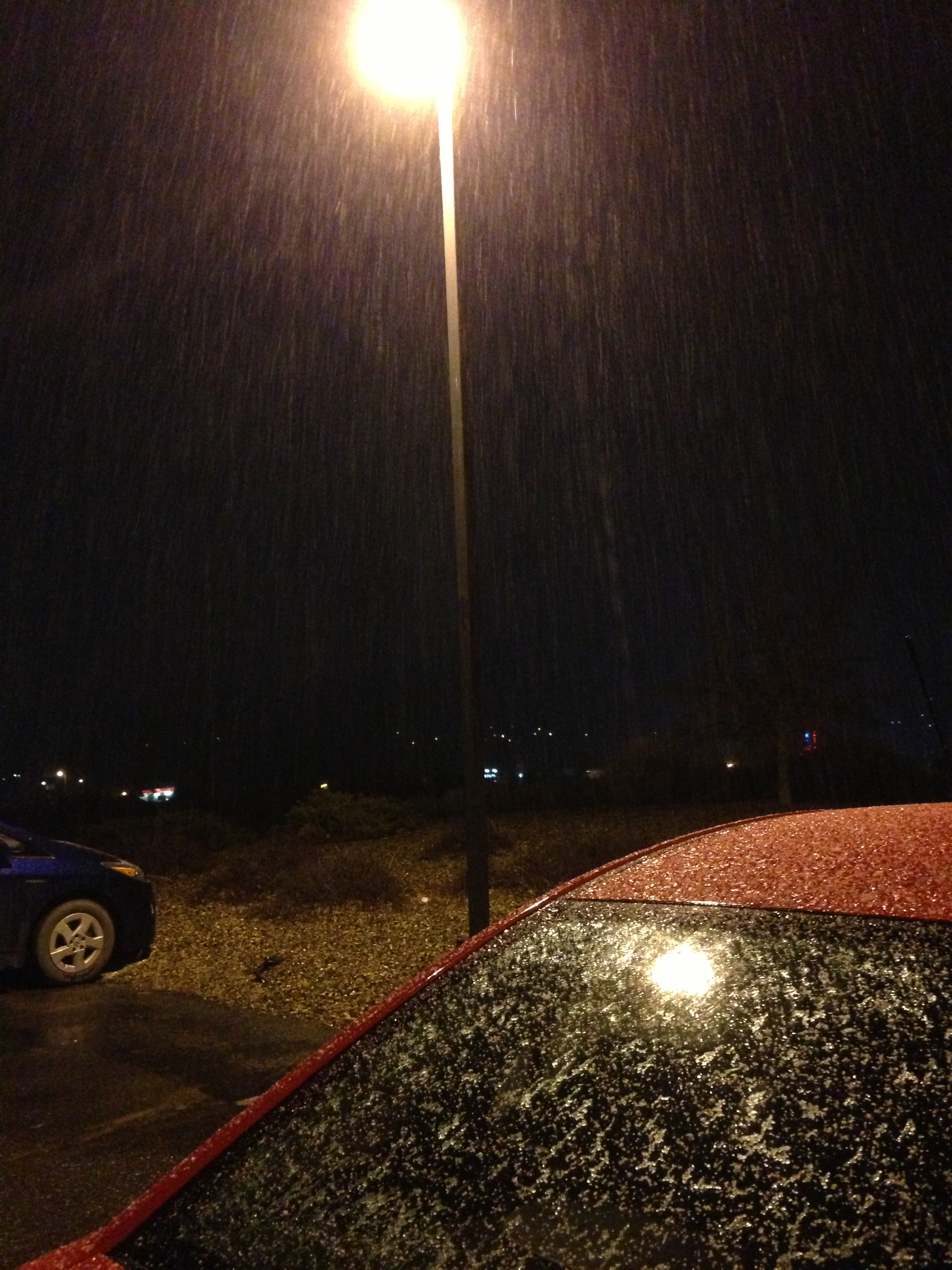

Rain and snow mixed (American English) or sleet (Commonwealth English) is precipitation composed of a mixture of rain and partially melted snow. Unlike ice pellets, which are hard, and freezing rain, which is fluid until striking an object where it fully freezes, this precipitation is soft and translucent, but it contains some traces of ice crystals from partially fused snowflakes, also called slush. In any one location, it usually occurs briefly as a transition phase from rain to snow or vice-versa, but hits the surface before fully transforming. Its METAR code is RASN or SNRA.

== Terminology ==
This precipitation type is commonly known as sleet in most Commonwealth countries. However, the United States National Weather Service uses the term sleet to refer to ice pellets instead.

== Formation ==
This precipitation occurs when the temperature in the lowest part of the atmosphere is slightly above the freezing point of water (0 °C or 32 °F). The depth of low-level warm air (below the freezing level) needed to melt snow falling from above to rain varies from about 230–460 m (750–1,500 ft) and depends on the mass of the flakes and the lapse rate of the melting layer. Rain and snow typically mix when the melting layer depth falls between these values as rain starts forming when in that range.

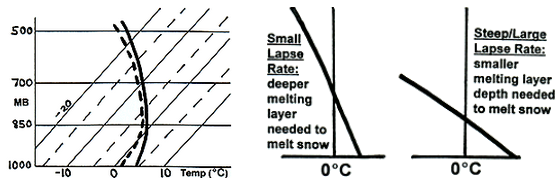
Rain-snow-mix soundings; left diagram shows typical skew-T appearance, while right diagram shows variations which result in mixtures of rain and snow

== "Wintry showers" or "wintry mixes" ==
Wintry showers is a somewhat informal meteorological term, used primarily in the United Kingdom, to refer to various mixtures of rain, graupel and snow at once. Though there is no "official" definition of the term, in the United Kingdom it is not used when there is any significant accumulation of snow on the ground. It is often used when the temperature of the ground surface is above 0 °C (32 °F), preventing snow from accumulating even if the air temperature near the surface is slightly below 0 °C (32 °F); but even then, the falling precipitation must generally have something else other than exclusively snow.

In the United States, wintry mix generally refers to a mixture of freezing rain, ice pellets, and snow. In contrast to the usage in the United Kingdom, in the United States it is usually used when both air and ground temperatures are below 0 °C (32 °F). Additionally, it is generally used when some surface accumulation of ice and snow is expected to occur. During winter, a wide area can be affected by the multiple mixed precipitation types typical of a wintry mix during a single winter storm, as counterclockwise winds around a storm system bring warm air northwards ahead of the system, and then bring cold air back southwards behind it. Most often, it is the region ahead of the approaching storm system which sees the wintry mix, as warm air moves northward and above retreating cold air in a warm front, causing snow to change into ice pellets, freezing rain and finally rain. The reverse transition can occur behind the departing low-pressure system, though it is more common for precipitation to freeze directly from rain to snow, or for it to stop before a transition back.

== See also ==
- Freezing rain
- Ice pellets
- Sleet (disambiguation)
- Slush
- Winter weather
