= Accretion (meteorology) =

Accumulation of frozen water as precipitation

Accretion is defined as the gradual collection of something over time. In meteorology or atmospheric science it is the process of accumulation of frozen water as precipitation over time as it descends through the atmosphere, in particular when an ice crystal or snowflake hits a supercooled liquid droplet, which then freeze together, increasing the size of the water particle. The collection of these particles eventually forms snow or hail in clouds and depending on lower atmosphere temperatures may become rain, sleet, or graupel. Accretion is the basis for cloud formation and can also be seen as water accumulates on the particulate matter and form jet contrails. This is because water vapor in the air requires condensation nuclei to form large droplets of solid or liquid water.

== See also ==
- Icing (aeronautics)
