= TK =

TK may refer to:

== People ==
- Tarantadong Kalbo (born 1985), Filipino comic strip cartoonist
- Tony Kanaan (born 1974), Brazilian racing driver
- Theodore K. Lawless (1892–1971), American dermatologist and philanthropist
- TK Cooper, English professional wrestler
- T. K. Oommen (born 1937), Indian sociologist, author, and professor

== Places ==
- Tehsil or taluk, an administrative division in several South Asian countries
- Daegu–Gyeongbuk or Taegu-Kyŏngbuk, two administrative regions in South Korea
- Tokelau's ISO 3166-1 country code

== Arts and media ==
=== Music ===
- TK (Peruvian rock band)
- TK Records, a record label
- Tetsuya Komuro (born 1958), also known as TK, Japanese musician and producer
- Toru Kitajima (born 1982), also known as TK from Ling Tosite Sigure, Japanese musician

=== Television ===
- Takeru "T.K." Takaishi, a character from Digimon anime
- TK, a character in Angel Beats!

=== Other media ===
- TK, an identification prefix for Imperial stormtroopers in the classic era of the Star Wars universe
- TK, the protagonist of the game Driver: Parallel Lines
- "Tk'tk'tk", a science-fiction short story by David D. Levine
- Tidens Krav, a newspaper published in Kristiansund, Norway
- Tom Kent (active 1970s–2000s), American radio DJ

== Businesses ==
- ThyssenKrupp, a German industrial conglomerate
- Techniker Krankenkasse, a German public health insurance
- Turkish Airlines (IATA code TK)
- TK Maxx, the European arm of TJ Maxx
- TK Lemonade, an Irish soft drink brand owned by Britvic

== Science and technology ==
- .tk, the Internet top-level domain for Tokelau
- Tk (software), a GUI toolkit
- Telecine, a process of transferring motion picture film to video
- Thymidine kinase, a protein
- Transketolase, an enzyme in the pentose phosphate pathway and in the Calvin cycle
- Type 94 tankette, a vehicle of the Imperial Japanese Army
- Korovin pistol, a Russian semi-automatic pistol

== Other uses ==
- Bangladeshi taka, a currency
- Takate kote, a form of Box tie in Japanese bondage
- Telekinesis, an alleged psychic ability
- To come (publishing), commonly abbreviated as "TK"
- Traditional knowledge
- Turkmen language ISO 639-1 language code
- Transitional kindergarten, part of the California public school system
- Ταχυδρομικός Κώδικας, Postal codes in Greece

== See also ==
- KT (disambiguation)
- T (disambiguation)
- K (disambiguation)
- TKS (disambiguation)
