= Sleet =

Sleet is a regionally variant term for some meteorological phenomena:

- Ice pellets, pellets of ice composed of frozen raindrops or refrozen melted snowflakes (United States)
- Rain and snow mixed, snow that partially melts as it falls (United Kingdom, Ireland, Canada, and most Commonwealth countries)
- Glaze (ice), a smooth coating of ice formed on objects by freezing rain.

== People with the surname ==
- David Sleet
- Don Sleet
- Gregory M. Sleet
- Jessie Sleet Scales
- Moneta Sleet Jr.

== Places ==
- Sleet Cone, a volcanic cone in British Columbia, Canada
