= Ice protection system =

System to limit ice on aircraft surfaces

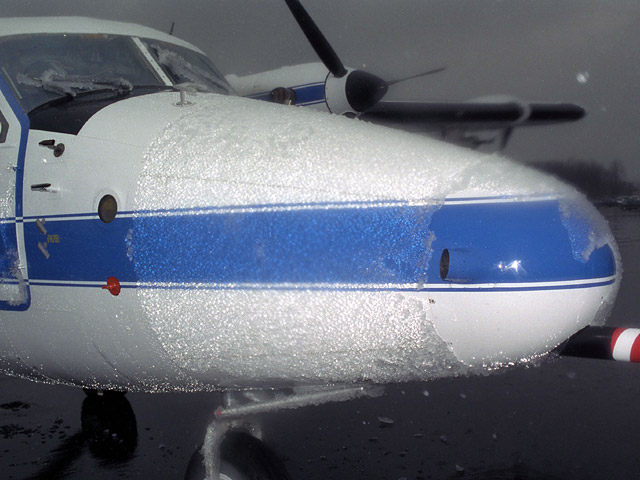
Supercooled large droplet (SLD) ice on a NASA Twin Otter research aircraft

In aeronautics, ice protection systems keep atmospheric moisture from accumulating on aircraft surfaces, such as wings, propellers, rotor blades, engine intakes, and environmental control intakes. Ice buildup can change the shape of airfoils and flight control surfaces, degrading control and handling characteristics as well as performance. An anti-icing, de-icing, or ice protection system either prevents formation of ice, or enables the aircraft to shed the ice before it becomes dangerous.

== Effects of icing ==
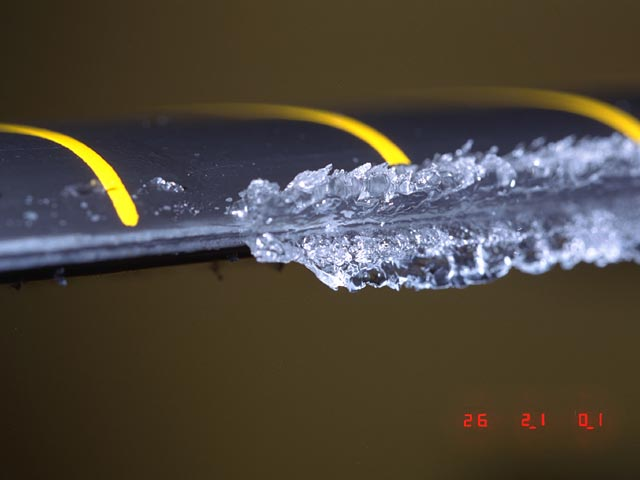
Ice accumulation on a rotor blade in a wind tunnel

Aircraft icing increases weight and drag, decreases lift, and can decrease thrust. Ice reduces engine power by blocking air intakes. When ice builds up by freezing upon impact or freezing as runoff, it changes the aerodynamics of the surface by modifying the shape and the smoothness of the surface which increases drag, and decreases wing lift or propeller thrust. Both a decrease in lift on the wing due to an altered airfoil shape, and the increase in weight from the ice load will usually result having to fly at a greater angle of attack to compensate for lost lift to maintain altitude. This increases fuel consumption and further reduces speed, making a stall more likely to occur, causing the aircraft to lose altitude.

Ice accumulates on helicopter rotor blades and aircraft propellers causing weight and aerodynamic imbalances that are amplified due to their rotation.

Anti-ice systems installed on jet engines or turboprops help prevent airflow problems and avert the risk of serious internal engine damage from ingested ice. These concerns are most acute with turboprops, which more often have sharp turns in the intake path where ice tends to accumulate.

== System types ==
=== Pneumatic deicing boots ===
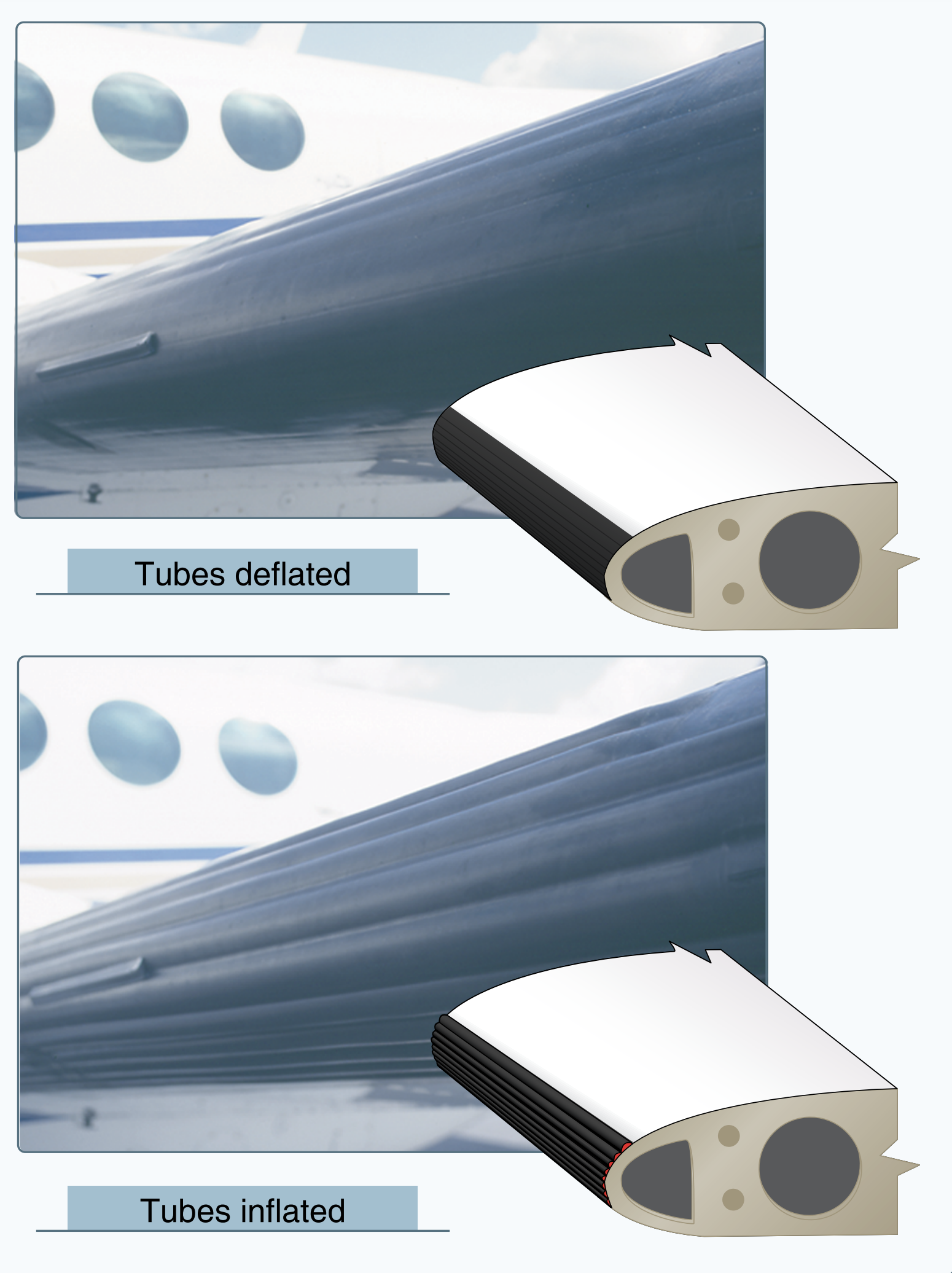
When ice builds up on the leading edge, an engine-driven pneumatic pump inflates the rubber boots.

The pneumatic boot is usually made of layers of rubber or other elastomers, with one or more air chambers between the layers. If multiple chambers are used, they are typically shaped as stripes aligned with the long direction of the boot. It is typically placed on the leading edge of an aircraft's wings and stabilizers. The chambers are rapidly inflated and deflated, either simultaneously, or in a pattern of specific chambers only. The rapid change in shape of the boot is designed to break the adhesive force between the ice and the rubber, and allow the ice to be carried away by the air flowing past the wing. However, the ice must fall away cleanly from the trailing sections of the surface, or it could re-freeze behind the protected area. Re-freezing of ice in this manner was a contributing factor to the crash of American Eagle Flight 4184.

Older pneumatic boots were thought to be subject to ice bridging. Slush could be pushed out of reach of the inflatable sections of the boot before hardening. This was resolved by speeding up the inflation/deflation cycle, and by alternating the timing of adjacent cells. Testing and case studies performed in the 1990s have demonstrated that ice bridging is not a significant concern with modern boot designs.

Pneumatic boots are appropriate for low and medium speed aircraft, without leading edge lift devices such as slats, so this system is most commonly found on smaller turboprop aircraft such as the Saab 340 and Embraer EMB 120 Brasilia. Pneumatic de-icing boots are sometimes found on other types, especially older aircraft. These are rarely used on modern jet aircraft. They were invented by B.F. Goodrich in 1923.

=== Fluid deicing ===
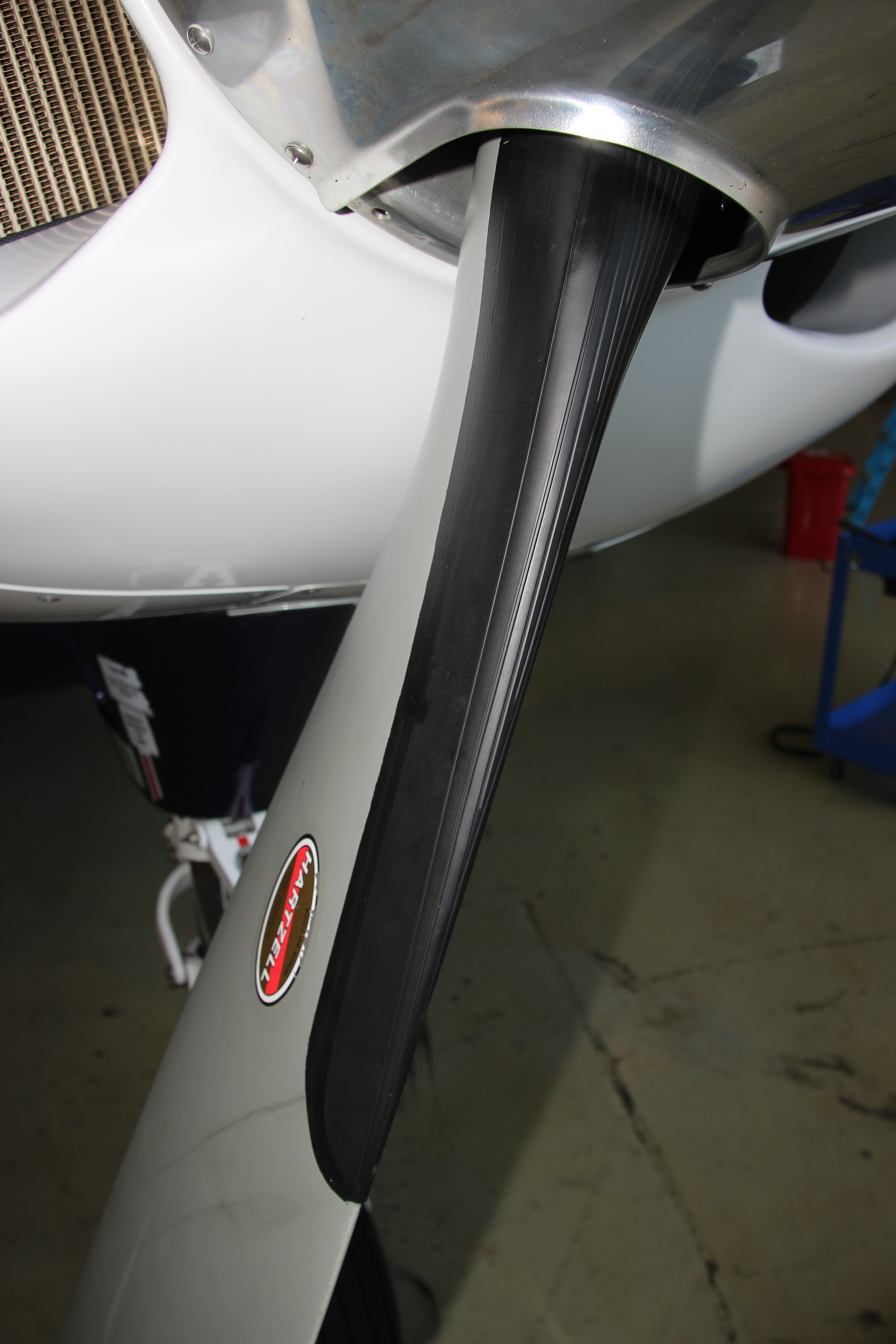
Propeller blade with fluid deicing system – glycol is sprayed from hub outward to cover blades

Sometimes called a weeping wing, running wet, or evaporative system, these systems use a deicing fluid, typically based on ethylene glycol or isopropyl alcohol, to prevent ice forming and to break up accumulated ice on critical surfaces of an aircraft. One or two electrically-driven pumps send the fluid to proportioning units that divide the flow between areas to be protected. A second pump is used for redundancy, especially for aircraft certified for flight into known icing conditions, with additional mechanical pumps for the windshield. Fluid is forced through holes in panels on the leading edges of the wings, horizontal stabilizers, fairings, struts, engine inlets, and from a slinger-ring on the propeller and the windshield sprayer. These panels have 1/400 inch (0.064 mm) diameter holes drilled in them, with 800 holes per square inch (120/cm^{2}). The system is self cleaning, and the fluid helps clean the aircraft, before it is blown away by the slipstream. The system was initially used during World War II by the British, having been developed by Tecalemit-Kilfrost-Sheepbridge Stokes (TKS).

Advantages of fluid systems are mechanical simplicity and minimal airflow disruption from the minuscule holes; this made the systems popular in older business jets. Disadvantages are greater maintenance requirements than pneumatic boots, the weight of potentially unneeded fluid aboard the aircraft, the finite supply of fluid when it is needed, and the unpredictable need to refill the fluid, which complicates en route stops.

=== Bleed air ===
Bleed air systems are used by most large aircraft with jet engines or turboprops. Hot air is "bled" off one or more engines' compressor sections into tubes routed through wings, tail surfaces, and engine inlets. Spent air is exhausted through holes in the wings' undersides.

A disadvantage of these systems is that supplying an adequate amount of bleed air can negatively affect engine performance. Higher-than-normal power settings are often required during cruise or descent, particularly with one or more inoperative engines. More significantly, use of bleed air affects engine temperature limits and often necessitates reduced power settings during climb, which may cause a substantial loss of climb performance with particularly critical consequences if an engine were to fail. This latter concern has resulted in bleed air systems being uncommon in small turbine aircraft, although they have been successfully implemented on some small aircraft such as the Cessna CitationJet.

=== Electro-thermal ===
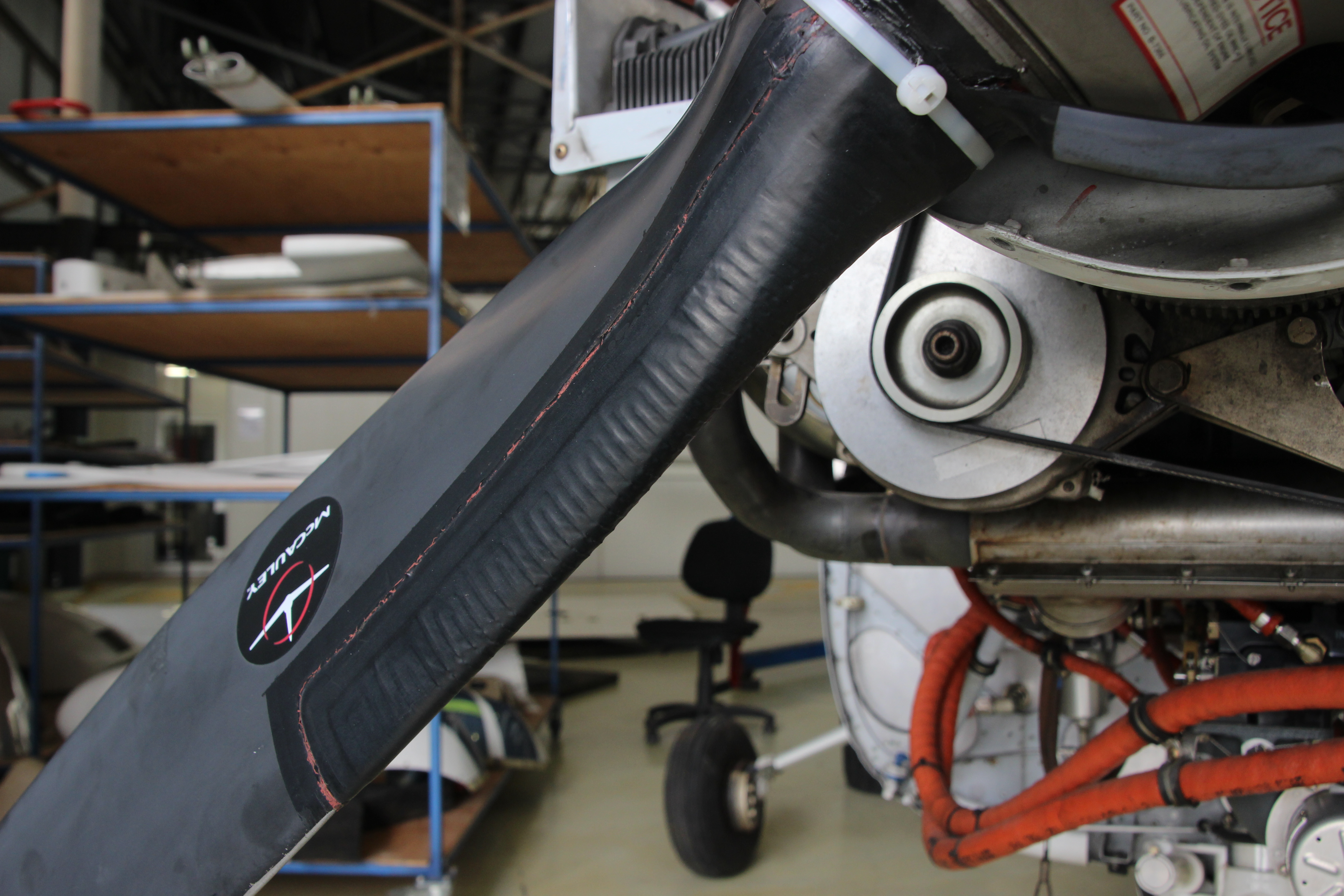
Detail of propeller with electro-thermal deicing system

Electro-thermal systems use heating coils (much like a low output stove element) buried in the airframe structure to generate heat when a current is applied. The heat can be generated continuously, or intermittently.

The Boeing 787 Dreamliner uses electro-thermal ice protection. In this case the heating coils are embedded within the composite wing structure. Boeing claims the system uses half the energy of engine fed bleed-air systems, and reduces drag and noise.

Etched foil heating coils can be bonded to the inside of metal aircraft skins to lower power use compared to embedded circuits as they operate at higher power densities. For general aviation, ThermaWing uses a flexible, electrically conductive, graphite foil attached to a wing's leading edge. Electric heaters heat the foil which melts ice.

Small wires or other conductive materials can be embedded in the windscreen to heat the windscreen. Pilots can turn on the electric heater to provide sufficient heat to prevent the formation of ice on the windscreen. However, windscreen electric heaters may only be used in flight, as they can overheat the windscreen. They can also cause compass deviation errors by as much as 40°.

One proposal used carbon nanotubes formed into thin filaments which are spun into a 10 micron-thick film. The film is a poor electrical conductor, due to gaps between the nanotubes. Instead, current causes a rapid rise in temperature, heating up twice as fast as nichrome, the heating element of choice for in-flight de-icing, while using half the energy at one ten-thousandth the weight. Sufficient material to cover the wings of a 747 weighs 80 g (2.8 oz) and costs roughly 1% of nichrome. Aerogel heaters have also been suggested, which could be left on continuously at low power.

=== Electro-mechanical ===
Electro-mechanical expulsion deicing systems (EMEDS) use a percussive force initiated by actuators inside the structure which induce a shock wave in the surface to be cleared. Hybrid systems have also been developed that combine the EMEDS with heating elements, where a heater prevents ice accumulation on the leading edge of the airfoil and the EMED system removes accumulations aft of the heated portion of the airfoil.

=== Passive (icephobic coatings) ===
Passive systems employ icephobic surfaces. Icephobicity is analogous to hydrophobicity and describes a material property that is resistant to icing. The term is not well defined but generally includes three properties: low adhesion between ice and the surface, prevention of ice formation, and a repellent effect on supercooled droplets. Icephobicity requires special material properties but is not identical to hydrophobicity.

To minimize accretion, researchers are seeking icephobic materials. Candidates include carbon nanotubes and slippery liquid infused porous surfaces (SLIPS) which repel water when it forms into ice.

== See also ==
- Atmospheric icing
- Icing conditions
- List of aircraft icing accidents and incidents

== Bibliography ==
- Pilot Guide: Flight in Icing Conditions (PDF). Federal Aviation Administration (Report). 8 October 2015. AC 91-74B.
- Szurovy, Geza (1999). Cessna Citation Jets. Osceola, Wisconsin: MBI Publishing Company. ISBN 0-7603-0785-7.
