= Rimed snow =

Snowflakes coated in frozen water droplets

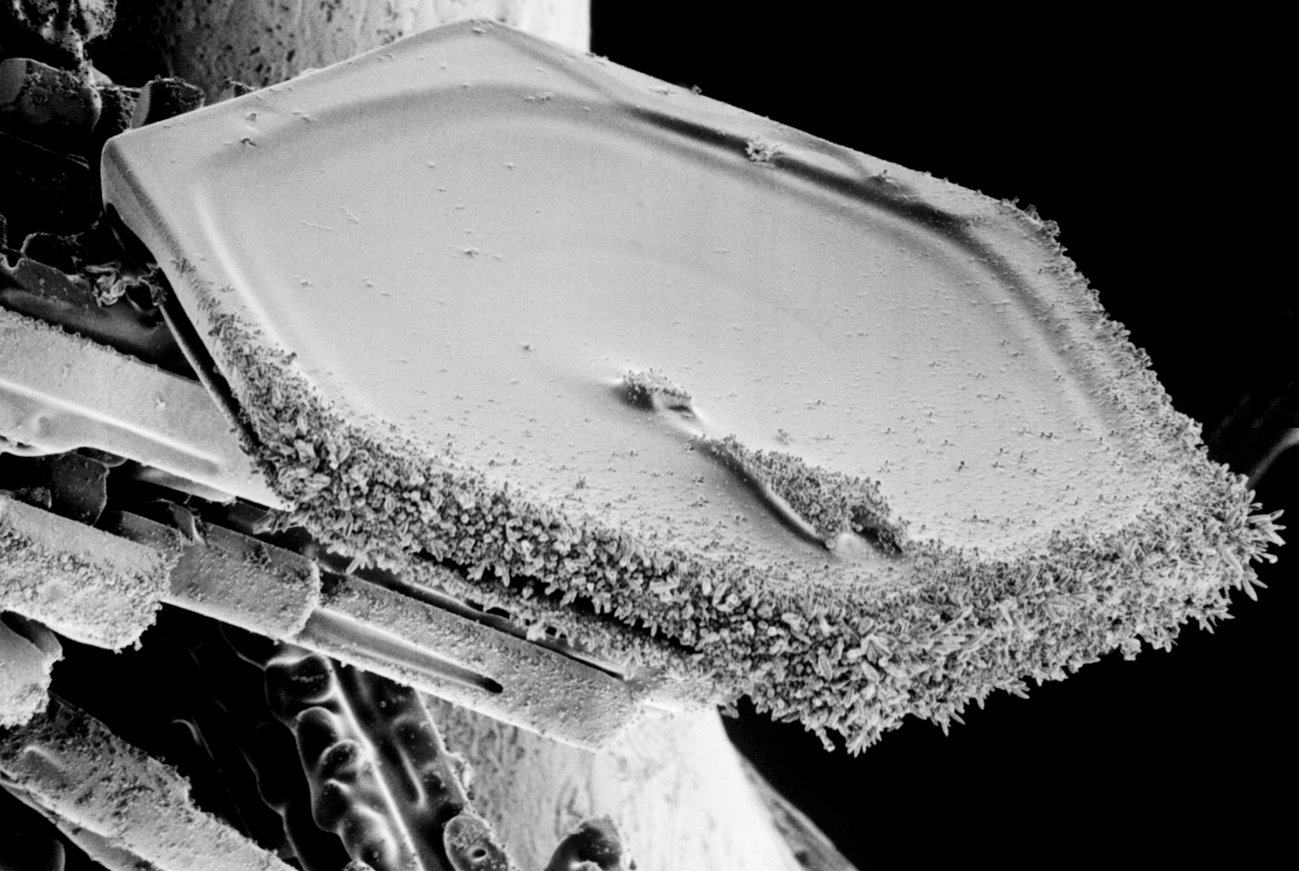
Image of rimed snowflake taken with an electron microscope

Rimed snow refers to snowflakes that are partially or completely coated in tiny frozen water droplets called 'rime'. Rime forms on a snowflake when it passes through a super-cooled cloud. Snowflakes that are heavily rimed typically produce very heavy and wet snow, with snow to liquid ratios in the 5:1 (i.e. five inches of snow per inch of rain) to 9:1 range.

Rimed snow has been found to provide greater initial stability for a snow layer. However, it also allows thicker, and therefore less stable, snow layers to build up. It could be argued that these cancel each other out.

There has been research into the effect of rimed snow on avalanches.

== See also ==
- Graupel
