= Ice pellets =

Precipitation consisting of small, translucent balls of ice

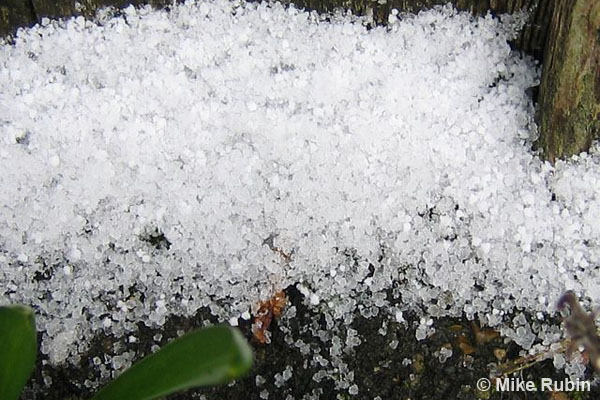

Ice pellets (Commonwealth English) or sleet (American English) is a form of precipitation consisting of small, hard, translucent balls of ice. Ice pellets are different from graupel ("soft hail"), which is made of frosty white opaque rime; and from a mixture of rain and snow, which is a slushy liquid or semisolid. Ice pellets often bounce when they hit the ground or other solid objects, and make a higher-pitched "tap" when striking objects like jackets, windshields, and dried leaves, compared to the dull splat of liquid raindrops. Pellets generally do not freeze into other solid masses unless mixed with freezing rain. The METAR code for ice pellets is PL (PE before November 1998).

== Terminology ==
Ice pellets are known as sleet in the United States, the official term used by the U.S. National Weather Service. However, the term sleet refers to a mixture of rain and snow in most Commonwealth countries instead, including Canada. Because of this, Environment Canada never uses the term sleet, and uses the terms "ice pellets" or "wet snow" instead of sleet.

== Formation ==
Temperature profile for ice pellet formation

Ice pellets form when a layer of above-freezing air is located between 1,500 and 3,000 meters (5,000 and 10,000 ft) above the ground, with sub-freezing air both above and below it. This causes the partial or complete melting of any snowflakes falling through the warm layer (the French term for sleet, neige fondue, literally means "melted snow" because of this). As they fall back into the sub-freezing layer closer to the surface, they re-freeze into ice pellets. However, if the sub-freezing layer beneath the warm layer is too small, the precipitation will not have time to re-freeze before hitting the surface, so it will become freezing rain and freeze on the surface instead. A temperature profile showing a warm layer above the ground is most likely to be found in advance of a warm front during the cold season, but can occasionally be found behind a passing cold front, and often with a stationary front.

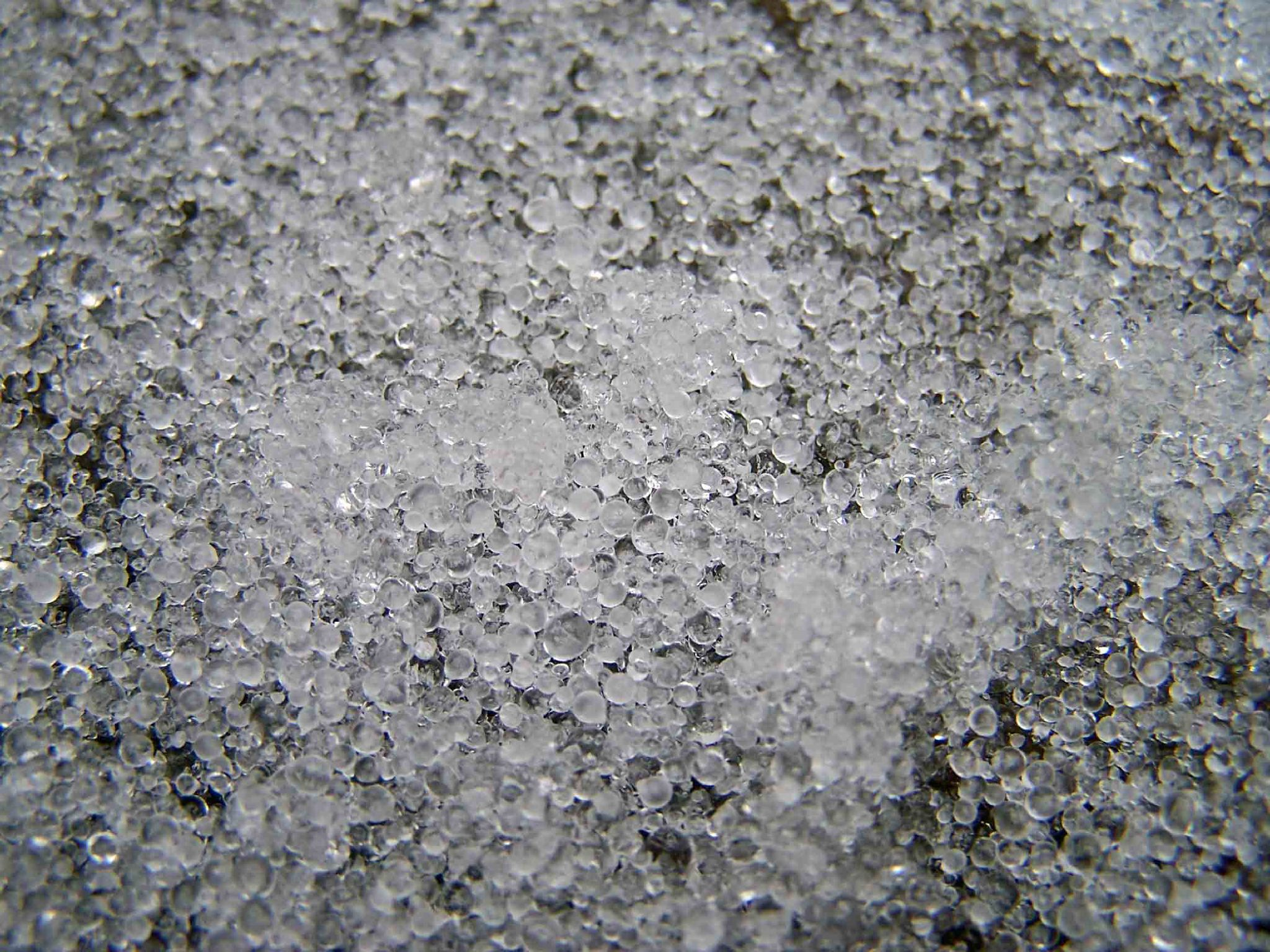
An accumulation of ice pellets

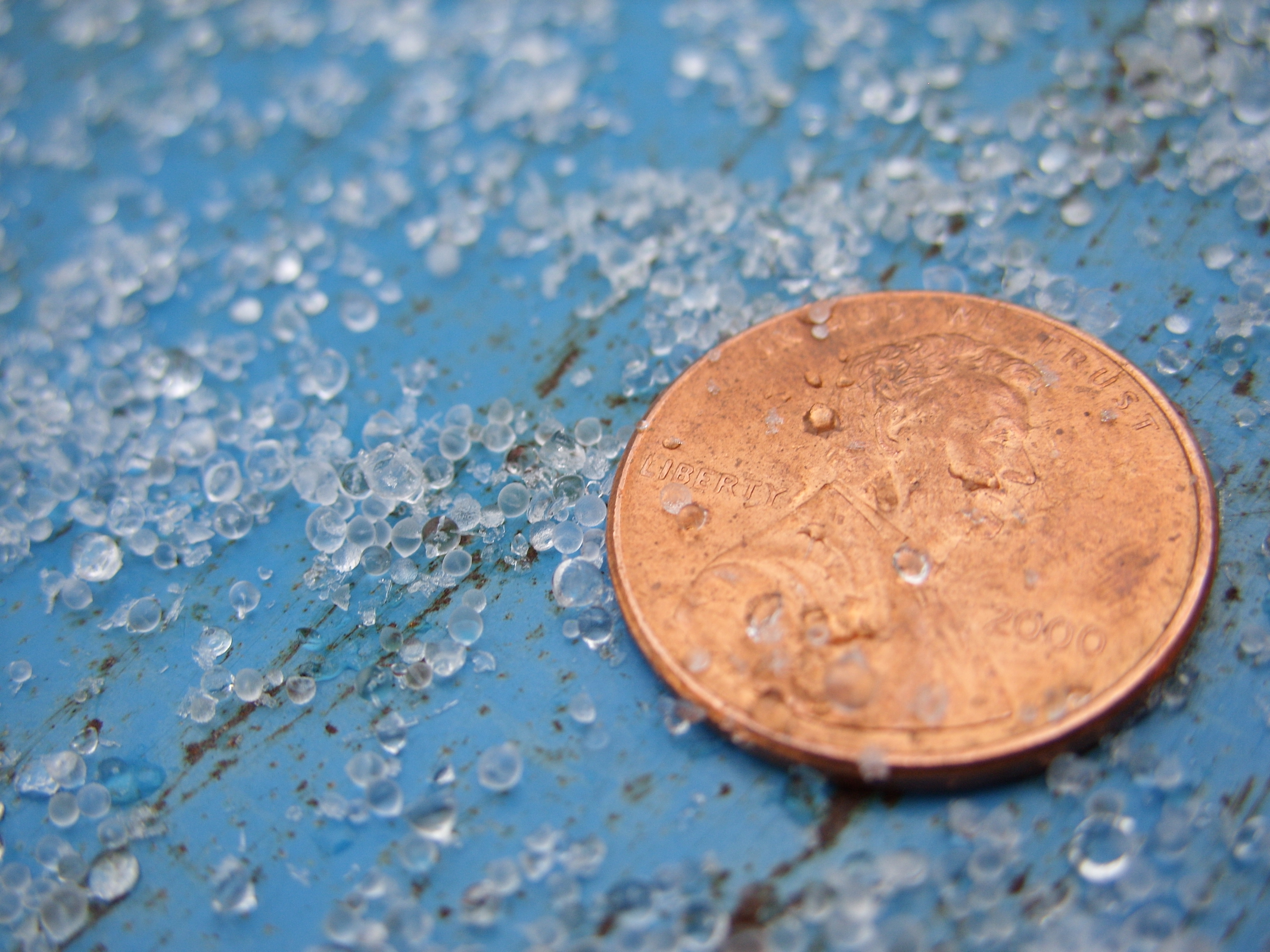
Ice pellets next to a U.S. penny (19.05 mm diameter) for scale

== Effects ==
In most parts of the world, ice pellets only occur for brief periods and do not accumulate a significant and troublesome amount. However, across the eastern United States and southeastern Canada, warm air flowing north from the Gulf of Mexico ahead of a strong synoptic-scale storm system can overrun cold, dense air at the surface for many hundreds of miles for an extended period of time. In these areas, ice pellet accumulations of 2–5 cm (0.8–2.0 in) are not unheard of. The effects of a significant accumulation of ice pellets are not unlike an accumulation of snow. One significant difference however is that for the same volume of snow, an equal volume of ice pellets is significantly heavier and thus more difficult to clear away. Additionally, a volume of ice pellets takes significantly longer to melt compared to an equal volume of fresh snowfall due to less surface area.

== See also ==
- Freezing rain
- Graupel
- Hail
- Sleet (disambiguation)
