= Thermawing =

Aircraft ice protection system

The ThermaWing ice protection system uses a flexible, electrically conductive, graphite foil attached to a wing's leading edge. Once activated the foil heats quickly, melting and then shedding any ice.

== Background ==
In 1998 NASA Glenn initiated the research and development of the Thermawing system for general aviation. Supported by the NASA SBIR (Small Business Innovative Research) program Kelly Aerospace Thermal Systems put the system into production. The FAA has certified the heater element configuration.

The original launch of the system was on Columbia Aircraft Manufacturing (now Cessna) 350 and 400 airframes. ThermaWing (formerly EVADE) employs 6 heaters, 3 heater control modules, one main electronic controller and one 7500 watt alternator.

== Operation ==
The outer layer of the laminate is made of heat-conducting polyvinyl chloride. It offers the durability of a fluoropolymer. A zoned heater system is controlled by a solid-state processor. The leading edge (the "impingement" area) is kept warm, continually melting ice as it begins to form. The area just aft, the shedding zone, is normally kept below freezing, causing the streaming water to freeze and collect as ice. During a de-ice cycle the voltage is increased, raising the temperature of this aft shedding zone, melting the ice bond and shedding the ice via aerodynamic force. Once power is removed from the heater, the shedding zone immediately refreezes and resumes collecting ice until the next de-ice cycle. This system takes as little as 1 second per surface and only 33 seconds to deice the entire aircraft using a 60-second cycle.

Once armed, the system is digitally controlled with automatic shedding cycles activating at 41 °F.

As of August 2024, the ThermaWing section of the Kelly Aerospace website is no longer active, and availability is uncertain.

== See also ==
- Icing conditions
- Ice protection
