= Stratiform =

Stratiform may refer to:

- Any of the stratus family of clouds (fog, stratus clouds, altostratus clouds, cirrostratus clouds, nimbostratus clouds) and the precipitation coming from them.
- Any occurrence of layered strata (see stratigraphic unit).
