= Rime ice =

Granular whitish deposit of ice formed by freezing fog

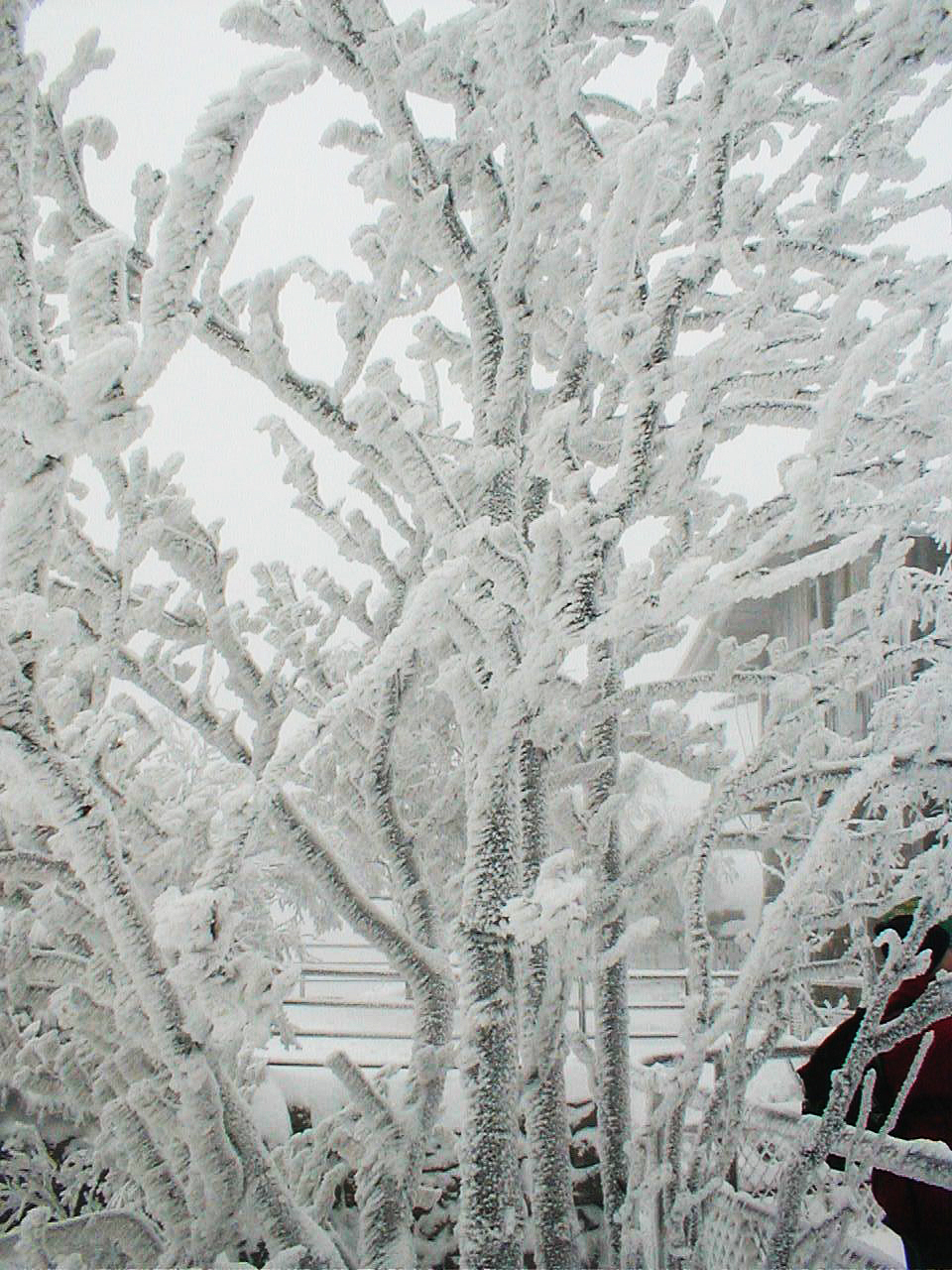
Hard rime on a tree

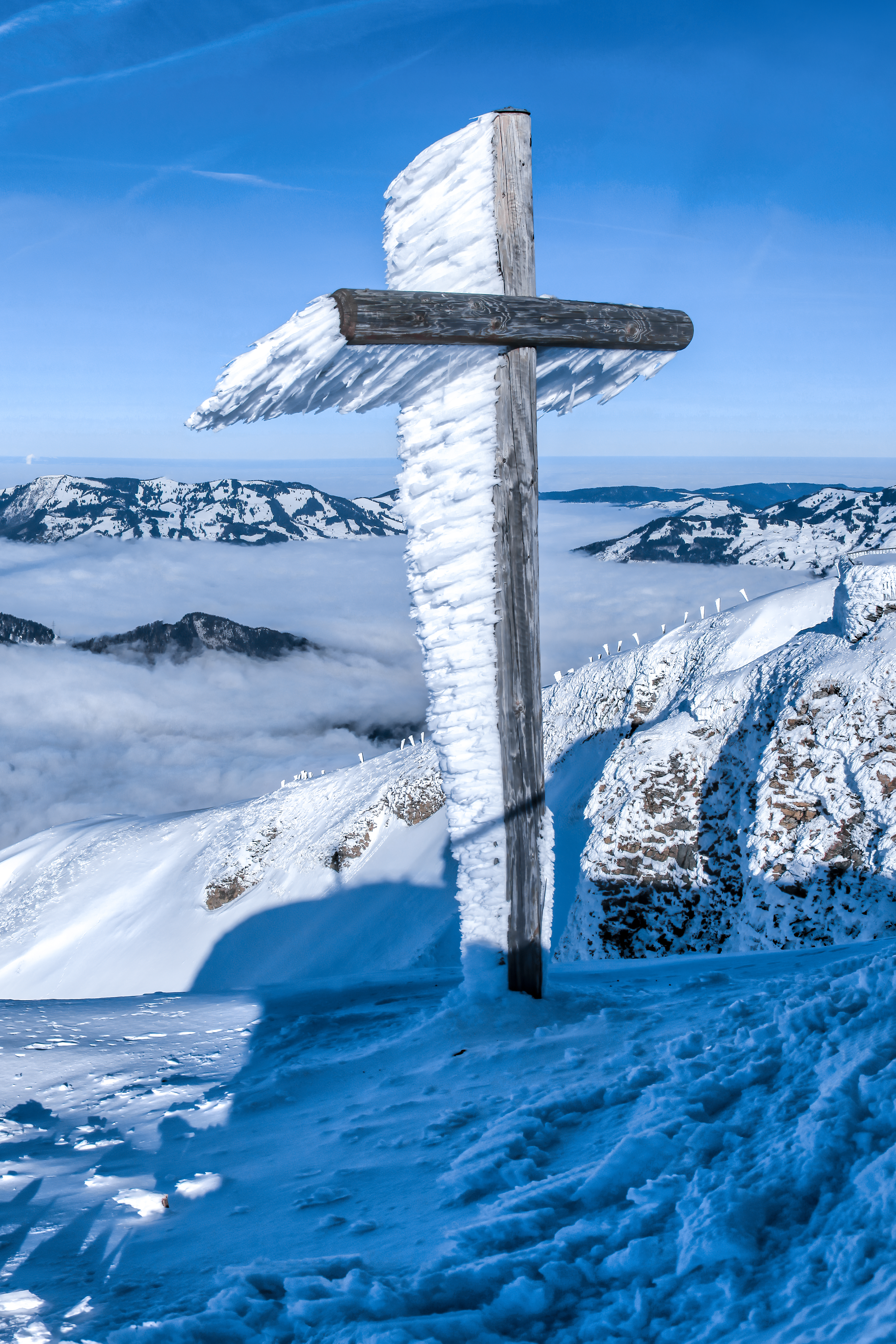
Wind blown rime ice formed on the summit cross of the Fronalpstock

Rime ice is a solid form of atmospheric deposition, a certain kind of ice created when supercooled water droplets freeze onto surfaces. In the atmosphere, there are three basic types of rime ice:

- Soft rime forms when supercooled water freezes under calm wind conditions. It is milky and crystalline, like sugar, and similar to hoar frost.
- Hard rime forms by rapid freezing of supercooled water under at least moderate wind conditions. The droplets freeze more or less individually, leaving air gaps.
- Clear ice forms by slow freezing of supercooled water. Clear ice is typically transparent and homogeneous. Its amorphous and dense structure makes it adhesive.

Soft and hard rime are less dense than clear ice and less adhesive, thus generally causing less damage. Glaze ice is similar in appearance to clear ice, but results from a completely different process, occurring during freezing rain or drizzle.

Rime ice also forms when ice forms on the surface of an aircraft, particularly on the leading edges and control surfaces when it flies through a cloud made of supercooled water liquid droplets. Rime ice is the least dense, milky ice is intermediately dense and clear ice is the most dense. All forms of ice can spoil lift and may have a catastrophic effect on an airborne aircraft. These hazardous effects are due to the ice's ability to disrupt airflow, increase weight, and add drag. Ice forming on propellers or engine inlets are especially dangerous as it can cause severe vibration and/or damage if ingested. The METAR code for rime/mist is BR.

== Hard rime ==
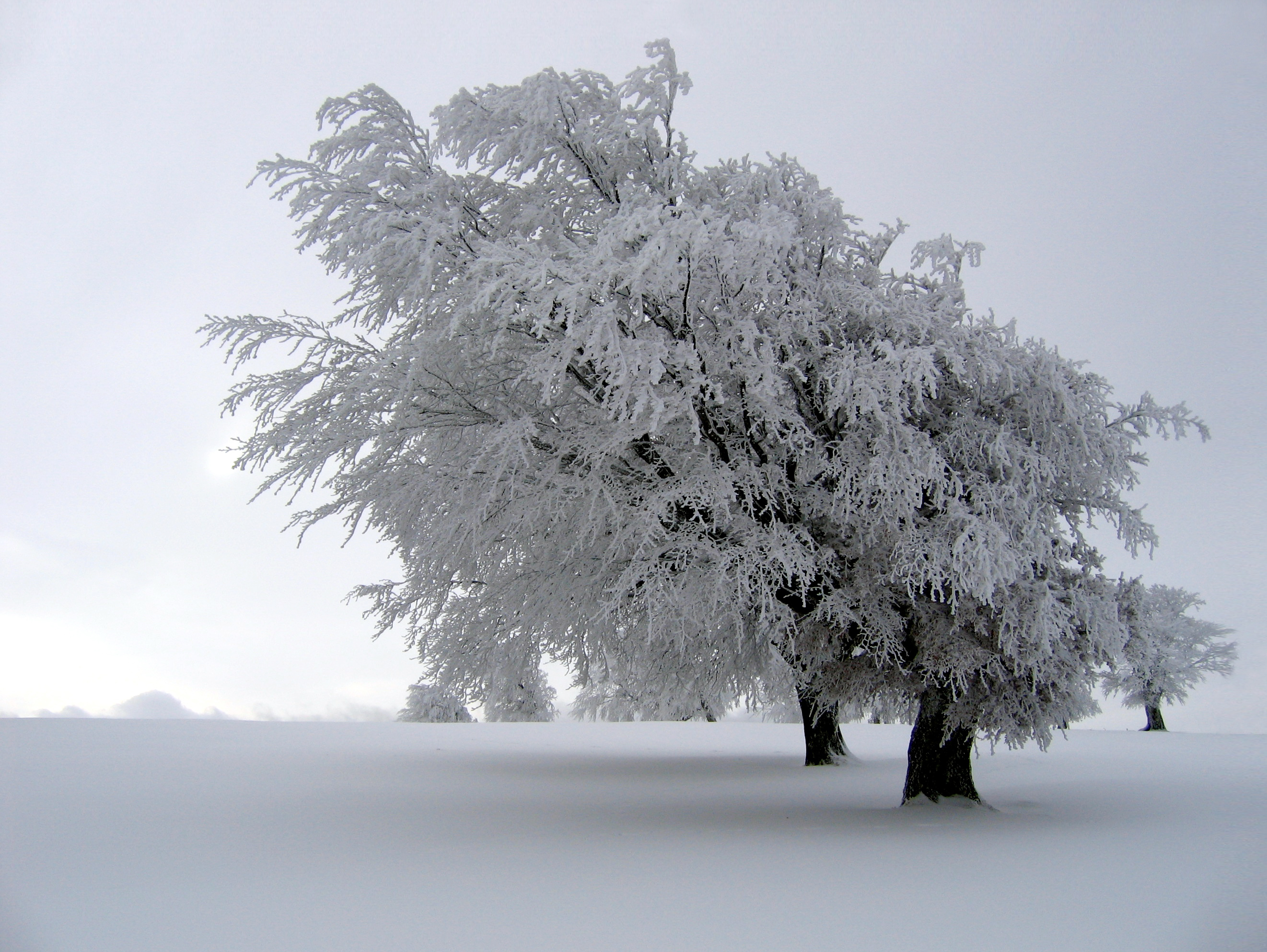
Hard rime on trees in the Black Forest of Germany

Hard rime is a white ice that forms when the water droplets in fog freeze to the outer surfaces of objects. It is often seen on trees atop mountains and ridges in winter, when low-hanging clouds cause freezing fog. This fog freezes to the windward (wind-facing) side of tree branches, buildings, or any other solid objects, usually with high wind velocities and air temperatures between −2 and −10 °C (28 and 14 °F).

=== Characteristics ===
Hard rime formations are more difficult to remove. They have a comb-like appearance, with the streaks of material parallel to that of the direction of the wind. This is unlike soft rime, which looks feathery or spiky, or clear ice, which looks homogeneous and transparent.

Scientists at meteorologically extreme places, such as Mount Washington in New Hampshire, often have to break huge chunks of hard rime off weather equipment in order to keep anemometers and other measuring instruments operating.

=== Formation on snow crystals ===
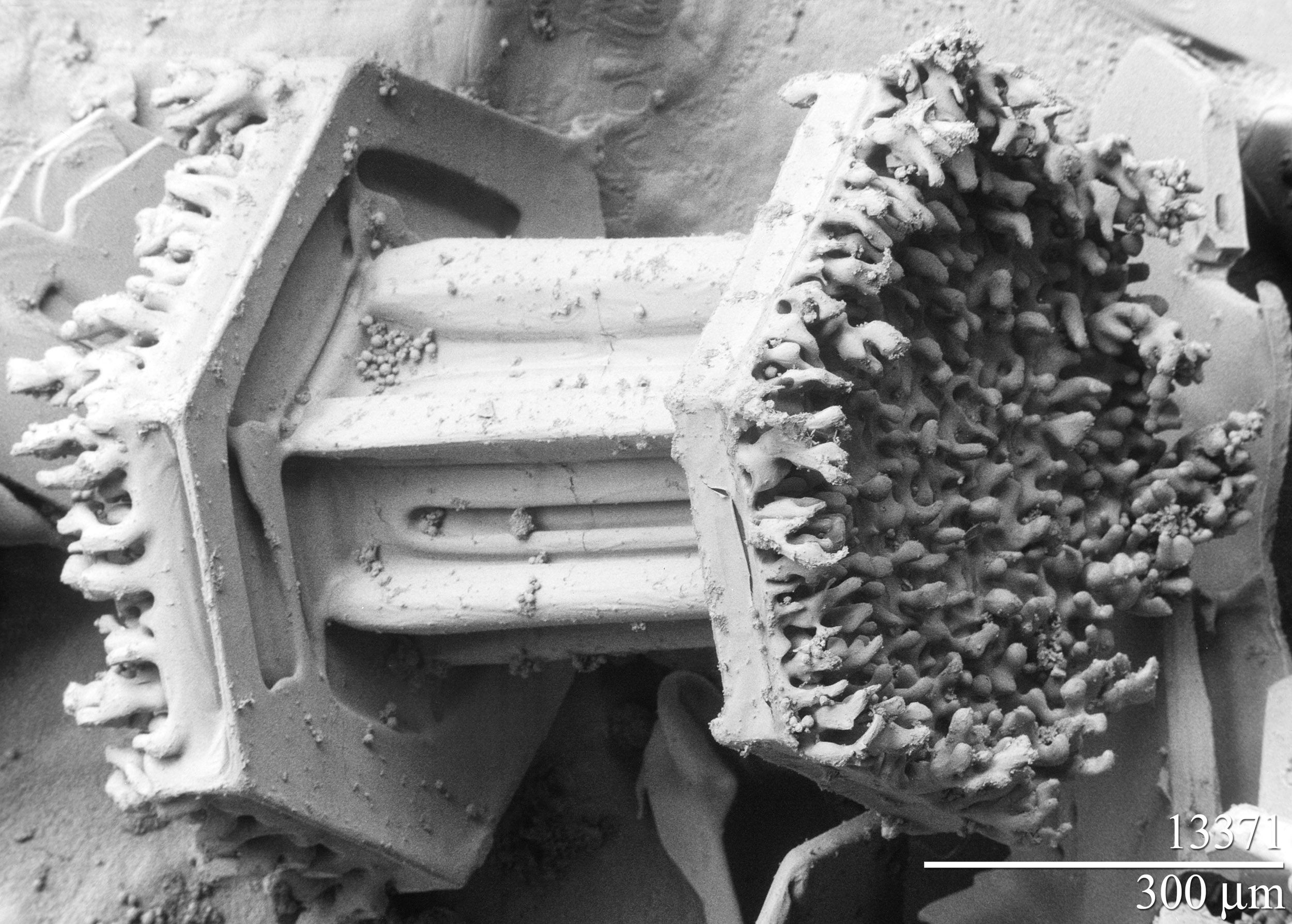
Electron microscope image of rime ice on both ends of a "capped column" snowflake

Under some specific atmospheric conditions, forming and descending snow crystals may encounter and pass via atmospheric supercooled cloud droplets. These droplets, which have a diameter of about 10 μm, can exist in an unfrozen state down to temperatures near −40 °C (−40 °F). Contact between the snow crystal and the supercooled droplets results in the freezing of the liquid droplets onto the surface of the crystals. This process of crystal growth is known as accretion. Crystals that exhibit frozen droplets on their surfaces are referred to as rimed. When this process continues to the point that the shape of the original snow crystal is no longer identifiable, the resulting crystal is referred to as graupel.

The frozen droplets on the surface of rimed crystals are hard to resolve and the topography of a graupel particle is not easy to record with a visible-wavelength microscope because of the limited resolution and depth of field in the instrument. However, observations of snow crystals with a low-temperature scanning electron microscope (LT-SEM) clearly show cloud droplets measuring up to 50 μm on the surface of the crystals. The rime has been observed on all four basic forms of snow crystals, including plates, dendrites, columns and needles. As the riming process continues the mass of frozen, accumulated cloud droplets obscures the identity of the original snow crystal, giving rise to a graupel particle.

== Soft rime ==
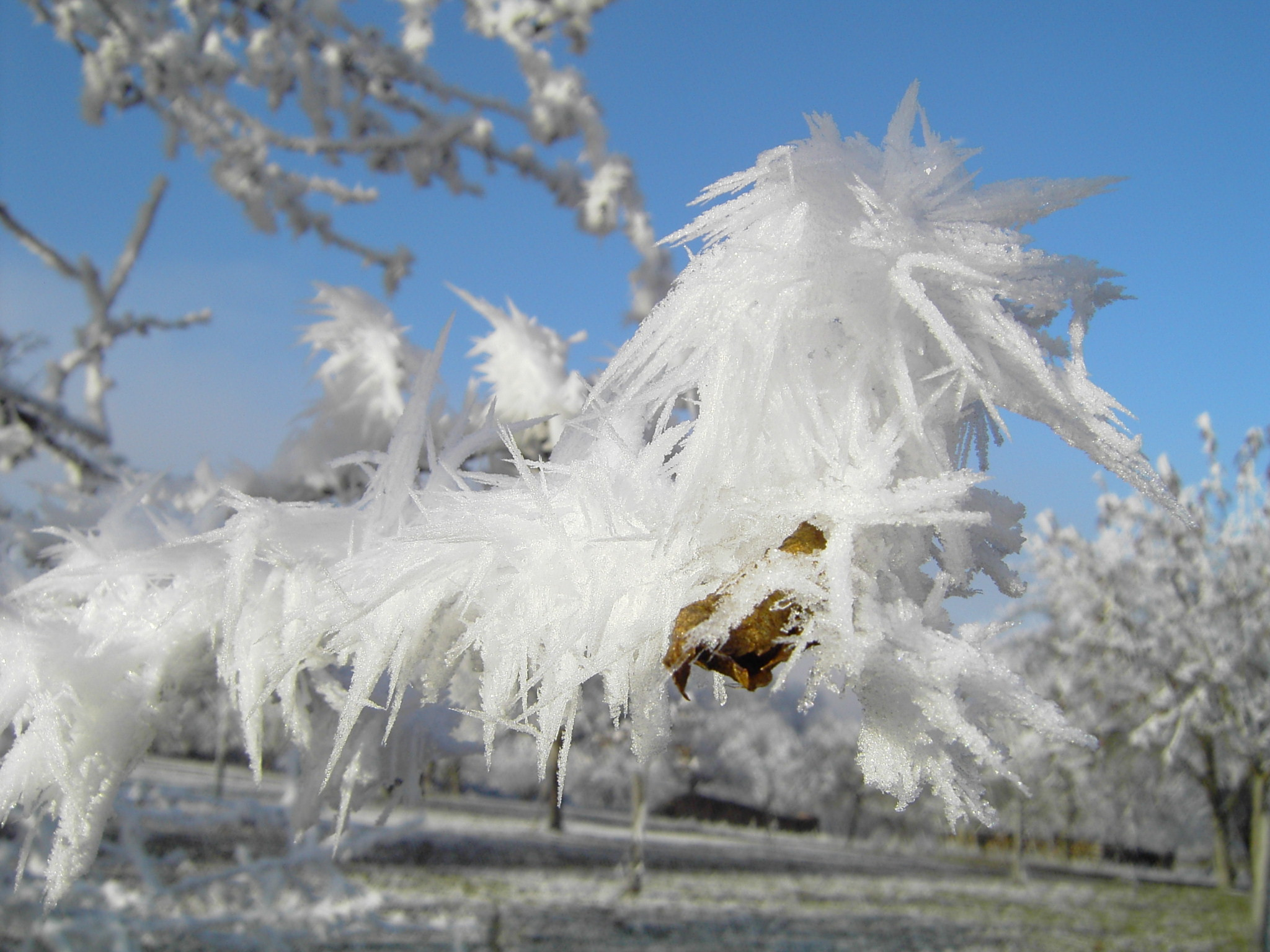
Soft rime

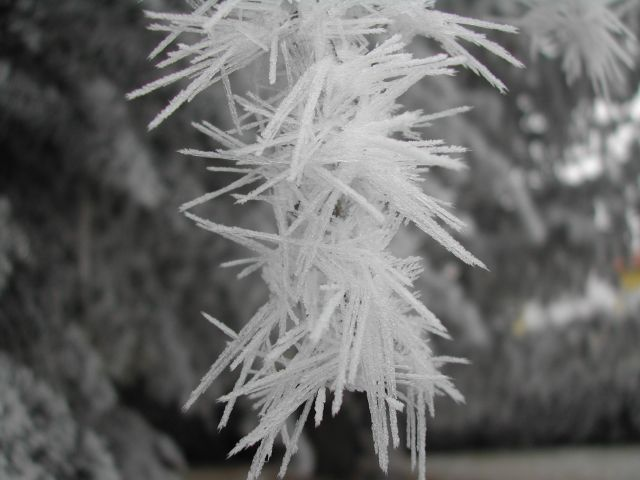
Soft rime

Soft rime is a white ice deposition that forms when the water droplets in light freezing fog or mist freeze to the outer surfaces of objects during calm or light wind. The fog usually freezes to the windward side of solid objects, particularly those with a likeness to that of tree branches and wires.

Soft rime is similar in appearance to hoar frost; but while rime is formed by vapour first condensing to liquid droplets (of fog, mist or cloud) and then attaching to a surface, hoar frost is formed by direct deposition from water vapour to solid ice. A heavy coating of hoar frost, called white frost, is very similar in appearance to soft rime, but the formation process is different; it happens when there is no fog, but very high levels of air relative humidity (above 90%) and temperatures below −8 °C (18 °F).

Soft rime formations appear as narrow white icy needles and scales. These needles are fragile and can be easily shaken off objects and removed. Factors that favour soft rime include: small drop size, the slow accretion of liquid water, a high degree of supercooling, and fast dissipation of latent heat of fusion.

== See also ==
- Atmospheric icing
- Rimed snow
