= Journal of Comparative Effectiveness Research =

- Discipline: Comparative effectiveness research
- Language: English

Publication details
- History: 2012–present
- Publisher: Future Medicine Ltd
- Frequency: Bimonthly
- Impact factor: 2.268 (2018)

Standard abbreviations
- ISO 4: J. Comp. Eff. Res.

Indexing
- ISSN: 2042-6305 (print); 2042-6313 (web)
- OCLC no.: 824964200

Links
- Journal homepage

The Journal of Comparative Effectiveness Research is a peer-reviewed medical journal that was established in 2012 and is published by Future Medicine. The editors-in-chief are Sheldon Greenfield (University of California, Irvine) and Eugene Rich (Mathematica Policy Research). The journal covers all aspects of comparative effectiveness research, including patient-centered outcomes research, pharmacoeconomics and health economics, relating to diagnostics, therapeutics, surgical procedures, or other healthcare services or options.

== Abstracting and indexing ==
The journal is abstracted and indexed in EMBASE/Excerpta Medica, EMCare, Index Medicus/MEDLINE/PubMed, Science Citation Index Expanded, and Scopus. According to the Journal Citation Reports, the journal has a 2016 impact factor of 1.204, ranking it 75th out of 90 journals in the category "Health Care Sciences & Services".
