= TKS (company) =

British aerospace manufacturer

- Industry: Aerospace
- Founded: 1942
- Defunct: 1990
- Successor: Aerospace Systems & Technologies, Ltd. (1990); CAV Aerospace, Inc. (2005); CAV Ice Protection, Inc. (2015)
- Headquarters: Haltwhistle, England

TKS (Tecalemit-Kilfrost-Sheepbridge Stokes) was a British aerospace manufacturer formed in 1942 to develop an ice protection system that could be compatible with the armoured leading edges and cable cutters incorporated on some military aircraft to combat the cables tethering barrage balloons which prevented the installation of conventional inflatable rubber de-icing boots.

The TKS company was a collaboration between Tecalemit Ltd, which was a company specialising in aircraft oil systems, filters, etc, Kilfrost Ltd, which specialised in anti-icing pastes for aircraft, and Sheepbridge Stokes Ltd, who specialised in iron castings, particularly such items as fuel and oil pump rotors.

The TKS system utilised a de-icing fluid that was made to seep through a porous strip along the wing and tail surface leading edges where it would then be spread out by the airflow, an early example of the TKS system's use being on the Avro Shackleton maritime patrol aircraft. Other aircraft so-equipped were the Vickers Viking, Handley Page Hermes, Handley Page Hastings, Avro Tudor, and de Havilland Dove.
