= Icephobicity =

Ability of a solid surface to repel ice

Icephobicity (from ice and Greek φόβος phobos "fear") is the ability of a solid surface to repel ice or prevent ice formation due to a certain topographical structure of the surface. The word "icephobic" was used for the first time at least in 1950; however, the progress in micropatterned surfaces resulted in growing interest towards icephobicity since the 2000s.

== Icephobicity vs. hydrophobicity ==
The term "icephobicity" is similar to the term hydrophobicity and other "-phobicities" in physical chemistry (oleophobicity, lipophobicity, omniphobicity, amphiphobicity, etc.). The icephobicity is different from de-icing and anti-icing in that icephobic surfaces, unlike the anti-icing surfaces, do not require special treatment or chemical coatings to prevent ice formation.

There is further parallelism between the hydrophobicity and icephobicity. The hydrophobicity is crucial for the "hydrophobic effect" and hydrophobic interactions. For two hydrophobic molecules (e.g., hydrocarbons) placed in water, there is an effective repulsive hydrophobic force, entropic in its origin, due to their interaction with the water medium. The hydrophobic effect is responsible for folding of proteins and other macro-molecules leading to their fractal shape. During ice crystal (snowflake) formation, the synchronization of branch growth occurs due to the interaction with the medium (oversaturated vapor) – is somewhat similar to the hydrophobic effect – the apparent repulsion of the hydrophobic particles due to their interaction with the medium (water). Consequently, despite the shapes of snowflakes being very diverse with "no two flakes similar to each other," most snow crystals are symmetric with each of the six branches almost identical to other five branches. Furthermore, both hydrophobicity and icephobicity can lead to quite complex phenomena, such as self-organized criticality-driven complexity as a result of hydrophobic interactions (during wetting of rough/heterogeneous surfaces or during polypeptide chain folding and looping) or ice crystallization (fractal snowflakes).

Note that thermodynamically both the hydrophobic interactions and ice formation are driven by the minimization of the surface Gibbs energy, ΔG = ΔH − TΔS, where H, T, and S are the enthalpy, temperature, and entropy, respectively. This is because in the hydrophobic interactions large positive value of TΔS prevails over a small positive value of ΔH making spontaneous hydrophobic interaction energetically profitable. The so-called surface roughening transition governs the direction of ice crystal growth and occurs at the critical temperature, above which the entropic contribution into the Gibbs energy, TΔS, prevails over the enthalpic contribution, ΔH, thus making it more energetically profitable for the ice crystal to be rough rather than smooth. This suggests that thermodynamically both the icephobic and hydrophobic behaviors can be viewed as entropic effects.

However, icephobicity is different from the hydrophobicity. Hydrophobicity is a property which is characterized by the water contact angle (CA) and interfacial energies of the solid-water, solid-vapor, and water-vapor interfaces and thus it is a thermodynamic property usually quantitatively defined as CA>90 degrees. Another difference is that the hydrophobicity is opposed to the hydrophilicity in a natural way. There is no such an opposition for the icephobicity, which should therefore be defined by setting a quantitative threshold. The icephobicity is much more similar to how the superhydrophobicity is defined.

== Quantitative characterization of icephobicity ==
In recent publications on the subject there are three approaches to the characterization of surface icephobicity. First, the icephobicity implies low adhesion force between ice and the solid surface. In most cases, the critical shear stress is calculated, although the normal stress can be used as well. While no explicit quantitative definition for the icephobicty has been suggested so far, the researchers characterized icephobic surfaces as those having the shear strength (maximum stress) less in the region between 150 kPa and 500 kPa and even as low as 15.6 kPa,.

Second, the icephobicity implies the ability to prevent ice formation on the surface. Such ability is characterized by whether a droplet of supercooled water (below the normal freezing temperature of 0 C) freezes at the interface. The process of freezing can be characterized by time delay of heterogeneous ice nucleation. The mechanisms of droplet freezing are quite complex and can depend on the temperature level, on whether cooling down of the droplet is performed from the side of the solid substrate or from vapor and by other factors.

Third, the icephobic surfaces should repel incoming small droplets (e.g., of rain or fog) at the temperatures below the freezing point.

These three definitions imply that icephobic surfaces should (i) prevent freezing of water condensing on the surface (ii) prevent freezing of incoming water (iii) if ice formed, it should have weak adhesion strength with the solid, so that it can be easily removed. Anti-icing properties may depend on such circumstances as whether the solid surface is colder than the air/vapor, how big is the temperature gradient, and whether a thin film of water tends to form on the solid surface due to capillary effects, disjoining pressure, etc. Mechanical properties of ice and the substrate also of great importance since ice shedding occurs as fracture, either in the Mode I (normal) or Mode II (shear) cracking, so that crack concentrators are major contributors to the reduced strength.
