= Icemaker =

Consumer device for making ice, found inside a freezer

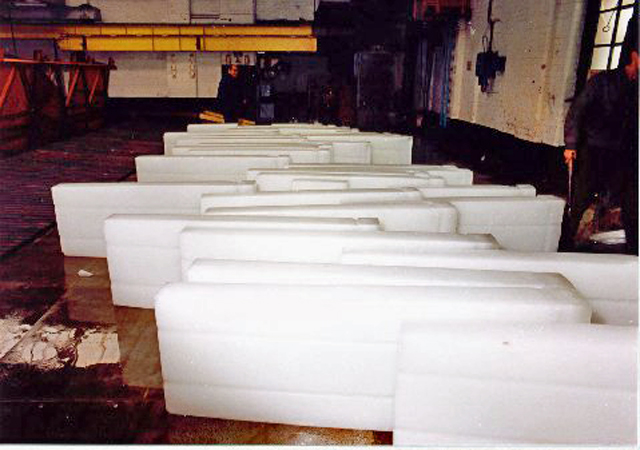
Slabs of manufactured ice at the Grimsby Ice Factory prior to being crushed, 1990

An icemaker or ice machine may refer to either a consumer device for making ice, found inside a home freezer, a stand-alone appliance for making ice, or an industrial machine for making ice on a large scale. The term "ice machine" usually refers to the stand-alone appliance.

The ice generator is the part of the ice machine that actually produces the ice. This includes the evaporator and any associated drives/controls/subframe that are directly involved with making and ejecting the ice into storage. When most people refer to an ice generator, they mean this ice-making subsystem alone, minus refrigeration.

An ice machine, however, particularly if described as 'packaged', will typically be a complete machine including refrigeration, controls, and dispenser, requiring only connection to power and water supplies. The term icemaker is more ambiguous, with some manufacturers describing their packaged ice machine as an icemaker, while others describe their generators in this way.

== History ==
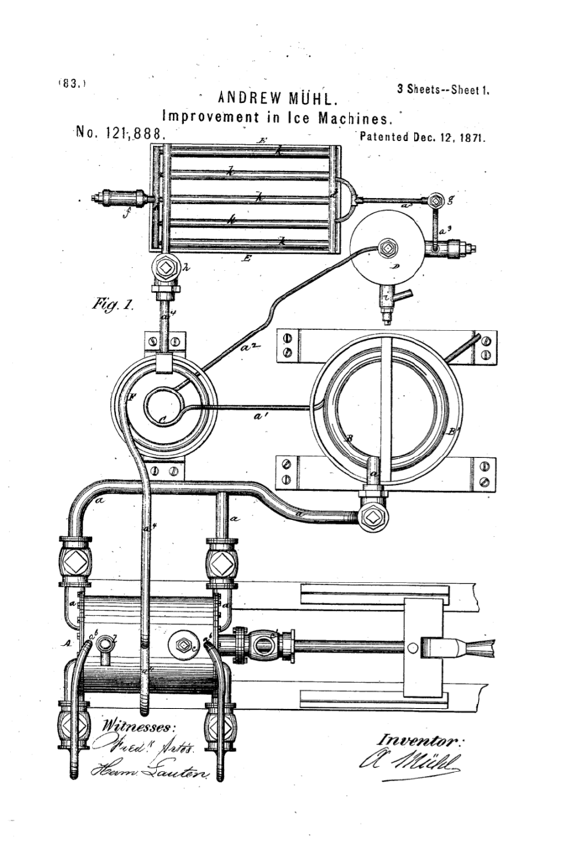
Icemaker Patent by Andrew Muhl, dated December 12, 1871

In 1748, the first known artificial refrigeration was demonstrated by William Cullen at the University of Glasgow. Mr. Cullen never used his discovery for any practical purposes. This may be the reason why the history of the icemakers begins with Oliver Evans, an American inventor who designed the first refrigeration machine in 1805. In 1834, Jacob Perkins built the first practical refrigerating machine using ether in a vapor compression cycle. The American inventor, mechanical engineer and physicist received 21 American and 19 English patents (for innovations in steam engines, the printing industry and gun manufacturing among others) and is considered today the father of the refrigerator.

In 1844, an American physician, John Gorrie, built a refrigerator based on Oliver Evans' design to make ice to cool the air for his yellow fever patients. His plans date back to 1842, making him one of the founding fathers of the refrigerator. Unfortunately for John Gorrie, his plans of manufacturing and selling his invention were met with fierce opposition by Frederic Tudor, the Boston “Ice King”. By then, Tudor was shipping ice from the United States to Cuba and was planning to expand his business to India. Fearing that Gorrie's invention would ruin his business, he began a smear campaign against the inventor. In 1851, John Gorrie was awarded U.S. Patent 8080 for an ice machine. After struggling with Tudor's campaign and the death of his partner, John Gorrie also died, bankrupt and humiliated. His original icemaker plans and the prototype machine are held today at the National Museum of American History, Smithsonian Institution in Washington, D.C.

In 1853, Alexander Twining was awarded U.S. Patent 10221 for an icemaker. Twining's experiments led to the development of the first commercial refrigeration system, built in 1856. He also established the first artificial method of producing ice. Just like Perkins before him, James Harrison started experimenting with ether vapor compression. In 1854, James Harrison successfully built a refrigeration machine capable of producing 3,000 kilograms of ice per day and in 1855 he received an icemaker patent in Australia, similar to that of Alexander Twining. Harrison continued his experiments with refrigeration. Today he is credited for his major contributions to the development of modern cooling system designs and functionality strategies. These systems were later used to ship refrigerated meat across the globe.

In 1867, Andrew Muhl built an ice-making machine in San Antonio, Texas, to help service the expanding beef industry before moving it to Waco in 1871. In 1873, the patent for this machine was contracted by the Columbus Iron Works, which produced the world's first commercial icemakers. William Riley Brown served as its president and George Jasper Golden served as its superintendent.

In 1876, German engineer Carl von Linde patented the process of liquefying gas that would later become an important part of basic refrigeration technology (U.S. Patent 1027862). In 1879 and 1891, two African American inventors patented improved refrigerator designs in the United States (Thomas Elkins – U.S. patent #221222 and respectively John Standard – U.S. patent #455891).

In 1902, the Teague family of Montgomery purchased control of the firm. Their last advertisement in Ice and Refrigeration appeared in March 1904. In 1925, controlling interest in the Columbus Iron Works passed from the Teague family to W.C. Bradely of W.C. Bradley, Co. Jurgen Hans is credited with the invention of the first ice machine to produce edible ice in 1929. In 1932 he founded a company called Kulinda and started manufacturing edible ice, but by 1949 the business switched its central product from ice to central air conditioning.

The ice machines from the late 1800s to the 1930s used toxic gases such as ammonia (NH_{3}), methyl chloride (CH_{3}Cl), and sulfur dioxide (SO_{2}) as refrigerants. During the 1920s, several fatal accidents were registered. They were caused by the refrigerators leaking methyl chloride. In the quest of replacing dangerous refrigerants – especially methyl chloride – collaborative research ensued in American corporations. The result of this research was the discovery of Freon. In 1930, General Motors and DuPont formed Kinetic Chemicals to produce Freon, which would later become the standard for almost all consumer and industrial refrigerators. The original "Freon" produced at this time was chlorofluorocarbon, a moderately toxic gas causing ozone depletion.

== Principle of ice making ==
All refrigeration equipment is made of four key components; the evaporator, the condenser, the compressor and the throttle valve. Ice machines all work the same way. The function of the compressor is to compress low-pressure refrigerant vapor to high-pressure vapor, and deliver it to the condenser. Here, the high-pressure vapor is condensed into high-pressure liquid, and drained out through the throttle valve to become low-pressure liquid. At this point, the liquid is conducted to the evaporator, where heat exchanging occurs, and ice is created. This is one complete refrigeration cycle.

== Consumer icemakers ==
=== Freezer icemakers ===
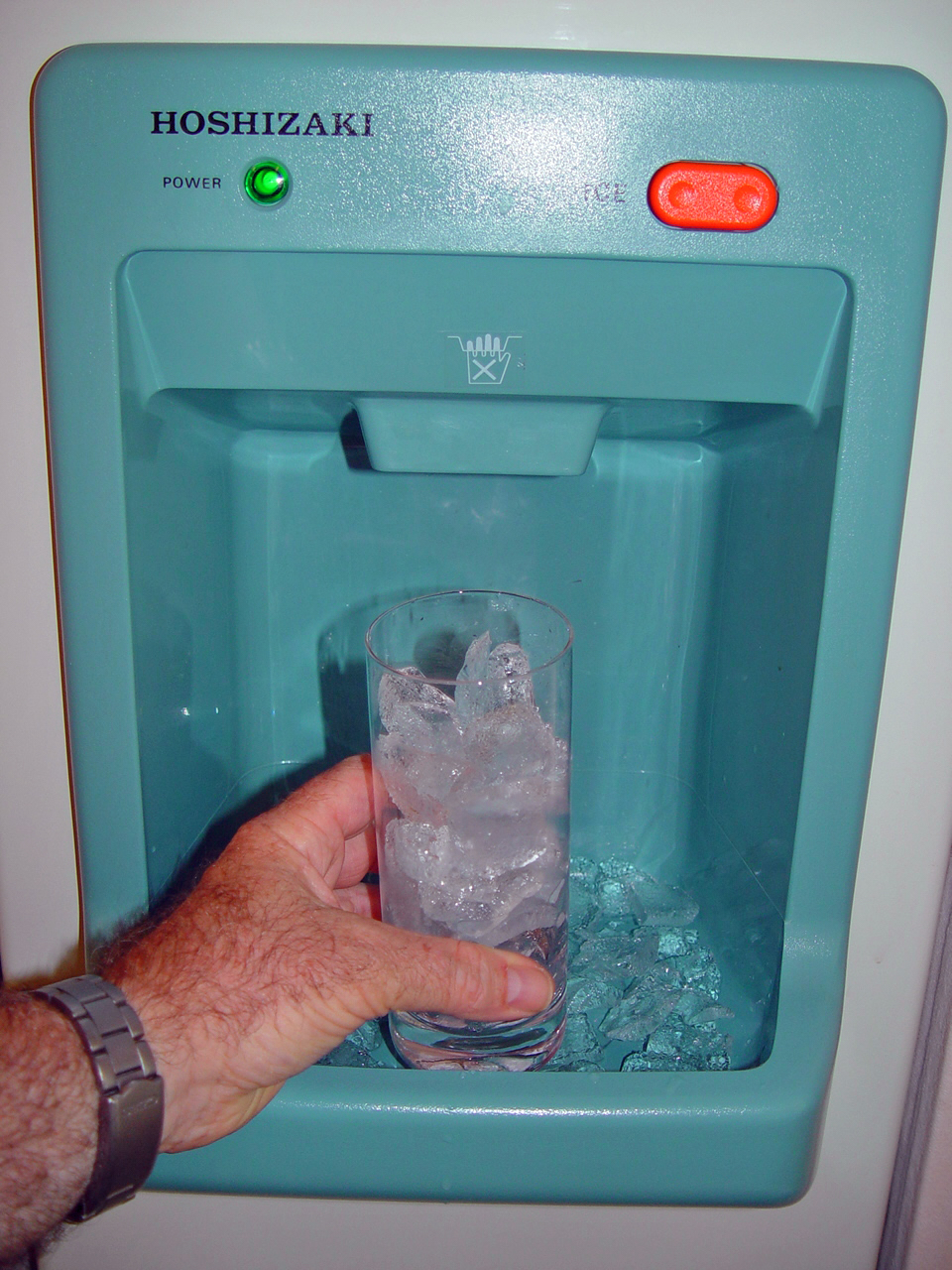
Icemaker (for hotel customers)

Automatic icemakers for the home were first offered by the Servel company around 1953. They are usually found inside the freezer compartment of a refrigerator. They produce crescent-shaped ice cubes from a metal mold. An electromechanical or electronic timer first opens a solenoid valve for a few seconds, allowing the mold to fill with water from the domestic cold water supply. The timer then closes the valve and lets the ice freeze for about 30 minutes. Then, the timer turns on a low-power electric heating element inside the mold for several seconds, to melt the ice cubes slightly so they will not stick to the mold. Finally, the timer runs a rotating arm that scoops the ice cubes out of the mold and into a bin, and the cycle repeats. If the bin fills with ice, the ice pushes up a wire arm, which shuts off the icemaker until the ice level in the bin goes down again. The user can also lift up the wire arm at any time to stop the production of ice.

Later automatic icemakers in Samsung refrigerators use a flexible plastic mold. When the ice cubes are frozen, which is sensed by a Thermistor, the timer causes a motor to invert the mold and twist it so that the cubes detach and fall into a bin.

Early icemakers dropped the ice into a bin in the freezer compartment; the user had to open the freezer door to obtain ice. In 1965, Frigidaire introduced icemakers that dispensed from the front of the freezer door. In these models, pressing a glass against a cradle on the outside of the door runs a motor, which turns an auger in the bin and delivers ice cubes to the glass. Most dispensers can optionally route the ice through a crushing mechanism to deliver crushed ice. Some dispensers can also dispense chilled water.

=== Fresh food compartment icemakers ===
Some newer refrigerators have the icemaker located in the fresh food compartment. In order to function properly, the icemaker compartment should keep temperature inside around 0 °C (32 °F) and needs to be properly sealed from the outside.

=== Portable icemakers ===
Icemaker

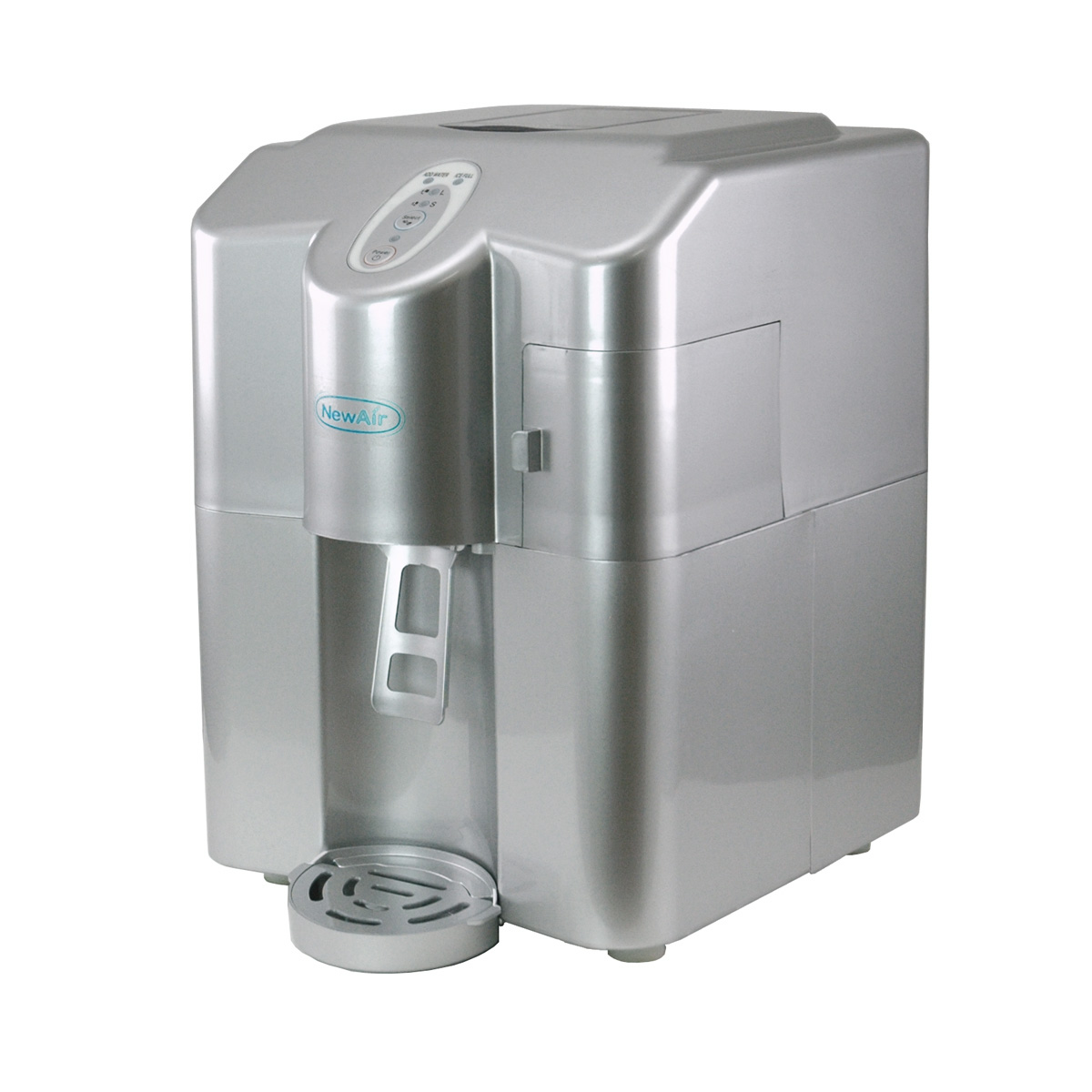
Portable icemaker (for home use)

Portable icemakers are units that can fit on a countertop. They are the fastest and smallest icemakers on the market. The ice produced by a portable icemaker is bullet-shaped and has a cloudy, opaque appearance. The first batch of ice can be made within 10 minutes of turning the appliance on and adding water. The water is pumped into a small tube with metal pegs immersed in the water. Because the unit is portable, water must be filled manually. The water is pumped from the bottom of the reservoir to the freeze tray. The pegs use a heating and cooling system inside to freeze the water around them and then heat up so the ice slips off the peg and into the storage bin. Ice begins to form in a matter of minutes, however, the size of ice cubes depends on the freezing cycle - a longer cycle results in thicker cubes. Portable icemakers will not keep the ice from melting, but the appliance will recycle the water to make more ice. Once the storage tray is full, the system will turn off automatically.

=== Built-in and freestanding icemakers ===
Built-in icemakers are engineered to fit under a kitchen or bar counter, but they can be used as freestanding units. Some produce crescent-shaped ice like the ice from a freezer icemaker; the ice is cloudy and opaque instead of clear, because the water is frozen faster than in others which are clear cube icemakers. In the process, tiny air bubbles get trapped, causing the cloudy appearance of the ice. However, most under-counter ice makers are clear ice makers in which the ice is missing the air bubbles, and therefore the ice is clear and melts much slower.

== Industrial icemakers ==
Commercial ice makers improve the quality of ice by using moving water. The water is run down a high nickel content stainless steel evaporator. The surface must be below freezing. Salt water requires lower temperatures to freeze and will last longer. Generally used to package seafood products. Air and undissolved solids will be washed away to such an extent that in horizontal evaporator machines the water has 98% of the solids removed, resulting in very hard, virtually pure, clear ice. In vertical evaporators the ice is softer, more so if there are actual individual cube cells. Commercial ice machines can make different sizes of ice like flakes, crushed, cubes, octagons, and tubes.

When the sheet of ice on the cold surface reaches the desired thickness, the sheet is slid down onto a grid of wires, where the sheet's weight causes it to be broken into the desired shapes, after which it falls into a storage bin.

=== Flake ice machine ===
Flake ice is made of the mixture of brine and water (max 500 g [18 oz] salt per ton of water), in some cases can be directly made from brine water. Thickness between 1 and 15 mm (1/16 and 9/16 in), irregular shape with diameters from 12 to 45 mm (1/2 to 1 3/4 in).

In a flake ice machine, the evaporator is a vertically placed drum-shaped stainless steel container, equipped with a rotating blade that spins and scratches the ice off the inner wall of the drum. When operating, the principal shaft and blade spin anti-clockwise pushed by the reducer. Water is sprayed down from the sprinkler; ice is formed from the water brine on the inner wall. The water tray at the bottom catches the cold water while deflecting ice and re-circulates it back into the sump. The sump will typically use a float valve to fill as needed during production. Flake machines have a tendency to form an ice ring inside the bottom of the drum. Electric heaters are in wells at the very bottom to prevent this accumulation of ice where the crusher does not reach. Some machines use scrapers to assist this. This system utilizes a low-temperature condensing unit; like all ice machines. Most manufactures also utilize an evaporator pressure regulating valve (EPRV).

==== Applications ====
Seawater flake ice machines can make ice directly from the seawater. This ice can be used in the fast cooling of fish and other sea products. The fishing industry is the largest user of flake ice machines. Flake ice can lower the temperature of cleaning water and sea products, therefore it resists the growth of bacteria and keeps the seafood fresh. Because of its large contact and less damage with refrigerated materials, it is also applied in vegetable, fruit, and meat storing and transporting. In baking, during the mixing of flour and milk, flake ice can be added to prevent the flour from self-raising. In most cases of biosynthesis and chemosynthesis, flake ice is used to control the reaction rate and maintain the liveness. Flake ice is sanitary, clean with a rapid temperature reduction effect. Flake ice is used as the direct source of water in the concrete cooling process, more than 80% in weight. Concrete will not crack if has been mixed and poured at a constant and low temperature. Flake ice is also used for artificial snow, so it is widely applied in ski resorts and entertainment parks.

=== Cube icemaker ===
Cube ice machines are classified as small ice machines, in contrast to tube ice machines, flake ice machines, or other ice machines. Common capacities range from 30 kg (66 lb) to 1,755 kg (3,869 lb). Since the emergence of cube ice machines in the 1970s, they have evolved into a diverse family of ice machines.

Cube ice machines are commonly seen as vertical modular devices. The upper part is an evaporator, and the lower part is an ice bin. The refrigerant circulates inside pipes of a self-contained evaporator, where it conducts the heat exchange with water, and freezes the water into ice cubes. Once frozen, an ejection mechanism releases the cubes into a collection bin. Frigidaire ice makers introduced in various types such as under counter, countertop, and commercial models, cube ice makers cater to diverse settings including food and beverage industries, healthcare, and residential use. When the water is thoroughly frozen into ice, it is automatically released, and falls into the ice bin.

Ice machines can have either a self-contained refrigeration system where the compressor is built into the unit, or a remote refrigeration system where the refrigeration components are located elsewhere, often the roof of the business.

==== Compressor ====
Most compressors are either positive displacement compressors or radial compressors. Positive displacement compressors are currently the most efficient type of compressor, and have the largest refrigerating effect per single unit (400–2500 RT). They have a large range of possible power supplies, and can be 380 V, 1000 V, or even higher. The principle behind positive displacement compressors utilizes a turbine to compress refrigerant into high-pressure vapor. Positive displacement compressors are of four main types: screw compressor, rolling piston compressor, reciprocating compressor, and rotary compressor.

Screw compressors can yield the largest refrigerating effect among positive displacement compressors, with their refrigerating capacity normally ranging from 50 RT to 400 RT. Screw compressors also can be divided into single-screw type and dual-screw type. The Dual-screw type is more often seen in use because it is very efficient. Rolling piston compressors and reciprocating compressors have similar refrigerating effects, and the maximum refrigerating effect can reach 600 kW. Reciprocating compressors are the most common type of compressor because the technology is mature and reliable. Their refrigerating effect ranges from 2.2 kW to 200 kW. They compress gas by utilizing a piston pushed by a crank shaft. Rotary compressors, mainly used in air conditioning equipment, have a very low refrigerating effect, normally not exceeding 5 kW. They work by compressing gas using a piston pushed by a rotor, which spins in an isolated compartment.

==== Condenser ====
All condensers can be classified as one of three types: air cooling, water cooling, or evaporative cooling.

- An air cooling condenser uses air as the heat-conducting media by blowing air through the surface of condensers, which carries heat away from the high-pressure, high-temperature refrigerant vapor.
- A water cooling condenser uses water as the heat-conducting media to cooling refrigerant vapor to liquid.
- An evaporative condenser cools the refrigerant vapor by using heat exchange between the evaporator pipes and the evaporated water which is sprayed on the surface of the pipes. This type of condenser is capable of working in warm environments; they are also very efficient and reliable.

=== Tube ice generator ===
A tube ice generator is an ice generator in which the water is frozen in tubes that are extended vertically within a surrounding casing—the freezing chamber. At the bottom of the freezing chamber, there is a distributor plate having apertures surrounding the tubes and attached to the separate chamber into which a warm gas is passed to heat the tubes and cause the ice rods to slide down.

Tube ice can be used in cooling processes, such as temperature controlling, fresh fish freezing, and beverage bottle freezing. It can be consumed alone or with food or beverages.

=== Directional Freezing ===
directional freezing is a method employed in some specialized industrial ice makers to produce clear ice typically for use in high-end bars and restaurants, ice sculptures, and occasionally science experiments requiring ice of a higher density. Ice makers designed to produce large blocks of ice usually consist of a large tub, with the cooling unit placed underneath, and a pump circulating water at the top, so as to prevent freezing on the surface of the water and to assist in the removal of dissolved gases from the water, which would otherwise make the resulting ice cloudy.

Much smaller countertop appliances, which employ similar methods, also exist to produce clear ice cubes, spherical, and other shapes, for home use.

== Global applications and impact ==
As of 2019 there were approximately 2 billion household refrigerators and over 40 million square meters of cold-storage facilities operating worldwide. In the US in 2018 almost 12 million refrigerators were sold. This data supports the assertion that refrigeration has global applications with positive impact upon the economy, technology, social dynamics, health, and the environment.

=== Economic applications ===
Refrigeration is necessary for the implementation of many current or future energy sources (hydrogen liquefying for alternative fuels in the automotive industry and thermonuclear fusion production for the alternative energy industries).

- The petro-chemical and pharmaceutical industries also need refrigeration, as it is used to control and moderate many types of reactions.
- Heat pumps, operating based on refrigeration processes, are frequently used as an energy-efficient way of producing heat.
- The production and transport of cryogenic fuels (liquid hydrogen and oxygen) as well as the long-term storage of these fluids is necessary for the space industry.
- In the transportation industry, refrigeration is used in marine containers, reefer ships, refrigerated rail cars, road transport, and in liquefied gas tankers.

=== Health applications ===
In the food industry, refrigeration contributes to reducing post-harvest losses while supplying foods to consumers, enabling perishable foods to be preserved at all stages from production to consumption. In the medical sector, refrigeration is used for transport of vaccines, organs, and stem cells, while cryotechnology is used in surgery and other medical research courses of action.

=== Environmental applications ===
Refrigeration is used in biodiversity maintenance based on the cryopreservation of genetic resources (cells; tissues; and organs of plants, animals and micro-organisms). Refrigeration enables the liquefaction of CO_{2} for underground storage, allowing the potential separation of CO_{2} from fossil fuels in power stations via cryogenic technology.

== Environmental impact ==
The main impact on the environment (like other refrigeration techniques) depends on refrigerants used and the effects when released.

The other impacts are related to impacts effecting Major appliances as a product category. This can split into: Energy consumption and whether the electricity was renewable; Pre-consumer impacts like manufacture and resource extraction; Disposal (e.g. recycling).

The refrigerants shown to be the most damaging are: Chlorofluorocarbon's (CFCs) and hydrochlorofluorocarbons (HCFCs). This due to being a ozone depleter and a powerful greenhouse gas.. Hydroflurocarbons were used as the alternative until it was discovered to be a powerful greenhouse gas. They are now being phased out in favour of alternative refrigerants. However older units can leak due to malfunction and incorrect disposal.

This has meant alternative refrigerants are being used to lower environmental impact.

=== Alternative refrigerants ===
==== Ammonia ====
The history of refrigeration began with the use of ammonia. After more than 120 years, this substance is still the preeminent refrigerant used by household, commercial and industrial refrigeration systems. The major problem with ammonia is its toxicity at relatively low concentrations. On the other hand, ammonia has an ozone depletion potential (ODP) of zero and very low global warming effects. While deaths caused by ammonia exposure are extremely rare, the scientific community has come up with safer and technologically solid mechanisms of preventing ammonia leakage in modern refrigerating equipment when properly maintained and inspected. Ammonia-based refrigeration systems are also less expensive to build than CFC-based systems, because narrower-diameter piping can be used, and the ammonia itself is considerably less expensive than CFCs or HCFCs while also being somewhat more efficient as a refrigerant.

==== Carbon dioxide (CO_{2}) ====
Carbon dioxide, which has been in use as a refrigerant since the nineteenth century, also has an ODP of zero. Its use had declined in favor of HCFC/CFC refrigerants, due to the high operating pressures necessary for its implementation in comparison to those chemical compounds. Modern technology is solving such issues and CO_{2} is more widely used today as an alternative due to climate concern issues in several fields: industrial refrigeration (CO_{2} is usually combined with ammonia, either in cascade systems or as a volatile brine), the food industry (food and retail refrigeration), heating (heat pumps) and the transportation industry (transport refrigeration).

==== Hydrocarbons ====
Hydrocarbons are natural products with high thermodynamic properties, zero ozone-layer impact and negligible global warming effects. One issue with hydrocarbons is that they are highly flammable, restricting their use to specific applications in the refrigeration industry.

In 2011, the EPA has approved three alternative refrigerants to replace hydrofluorocarbons (HFCs) in commercial and household freezers via the Significant New Alternatives Policy (SNAP) program. The three alternative refrigerants legalized by the EPA were hydrocarbons propane, isobutane and a substance called HCR188C – a hydrocarbon blend (ethane, propane, isobutane and n-butane). HCR188C is used today in commercial refrigeration applications (supermarket refrigerators, stand-alone refrigerators and refrigerating display cases), in refrigerated transportation, automotive air-conditioning systems and retrofit safety valve (for automotive applications) and residential window air conditioners.

=== Future of refrigeration ===
In October 2016, negotiators from 197 countries have reached an agreement to reduce emissions of chemical refrigerants that contribute to global warming, re-emphasizing the historical importance of the Montreal Protocol and aiming to increase its impact upon the use greenhouse gases besides the efforts made to reduce ozone depletion caused by the chlorofluorocarbons. The agreement, closed at a United Nations meeting in Kigali, Rwanda set the terms for a rapid phasedown of hydrofluorocarbons (HFCs) which would be stopped from manufacturing altogether and have their uses reduced over time.

The UN agenda and the Rwanda deal aims to find a new generation of refrigerants to be safe from both an ozone layer and greenhouse effect point of view. The legally binding agreement could reduce projected emissions by as much as 88% and lower global warming with almost 0.5 degrees Celsius (nearly 1 degree Fahrenheit) by 2100.

== See also ==
- Pumpable ice technology
- Yakhchāl
