= Black ice =

Thin coating of glazed ice on a surface

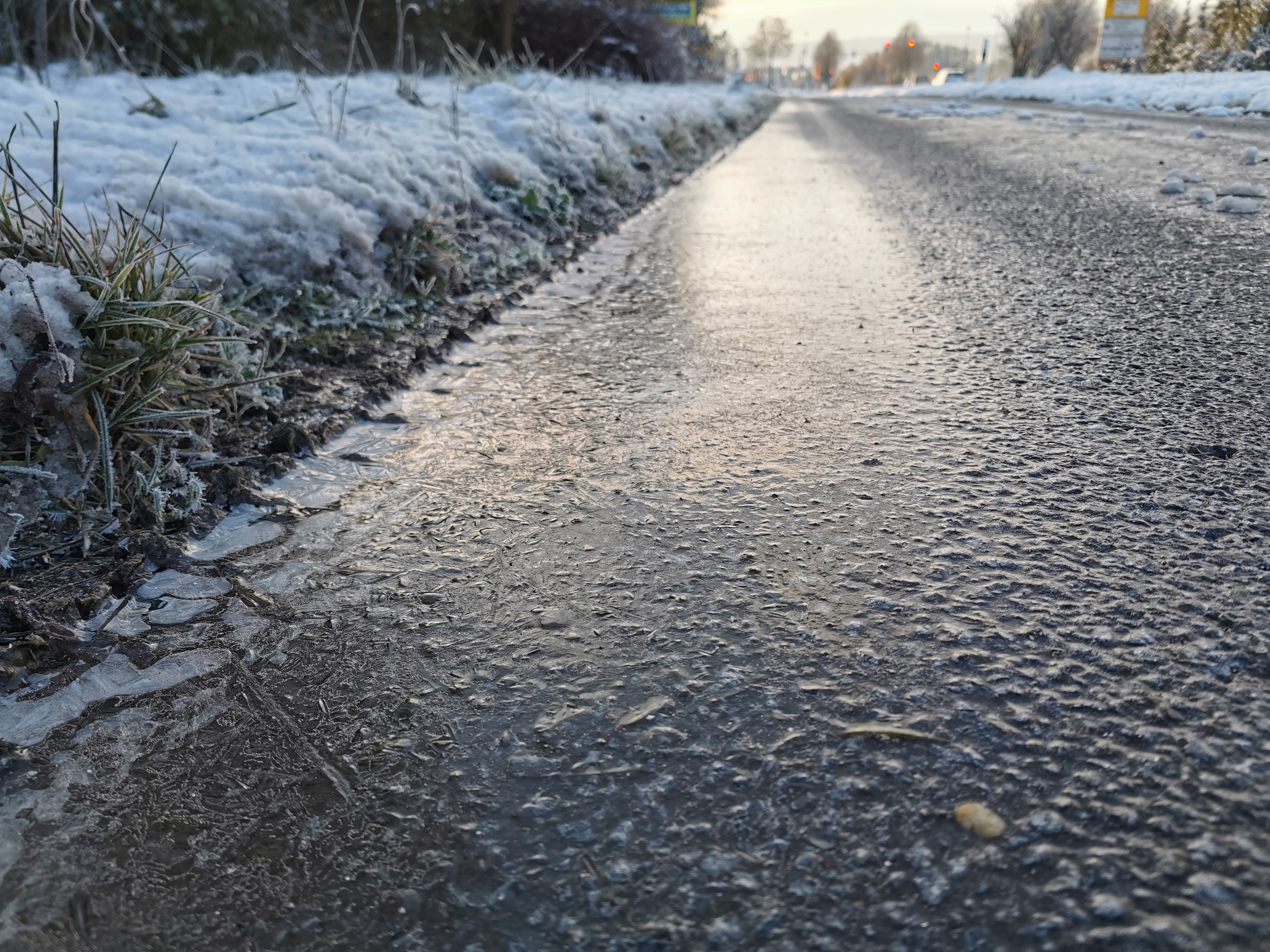
Black ice on a road in Germany

Black ice, sometimes called clear ice, is a coating of glaze ice on a surface, for example on streets or on lakes. The ice itself is not black, but visually transparent, allowing the often black road below to be seen through it and light to be transmitted. The typically low levels of noticeable ice pellets, snow, or sleet surrounding black ice means that areas of the ice are often next to invisible to drivers, cyclists or people walking on it. Thus, there is a risk of slippage and subsequent accident due to the unexpected loss of traction.

== Definitions ==
The term "black ice" in the United States is defined by the National Weather Service as "patchy ice on roadways or other transportation surfaces that cannot easily be seen. It is often clear (not white) with the black road surface visible underneath. It is most prevalent during the early morning hours, especially after snowmelt on the roadways has a chance to refreeze overnight when the temperature drops below freezing. Black ice can also form when roadways are slick from rain and temperatures drop below freezing overnight."

The World Meteorological Organization definitions of black ice are:

- A popular alternative for the term glaze. A thin sheet of ice, relatively dark in appearance, may form when light rain or drizzle falls on a road surface that is at a temperature below freezing point or, alternatively, when water already on the road surface subsequently freezes when its temperature falls below freezing point. It may also be formed when supercooled fog droplets are intercepted by buildings, fences, and vegetation.
- Thin, new ice on freshwater or saltwater, appearing dark in color because of its transparency, a result of its columnar grain structure.

== Formation ==
=== On roads and pavements ===
The American Meteorological Society Glossary of Meteorology includes the definition of black ice as "a thin sheet of ice, relatively dark in appearance, [that] may form when light rain or drizzle falls on a road surface that is at a temperature below 0 °C (32 °F)." Because it represents only a thin accumulation, black ice is highly transparent and thus difficult to see compared with snow, frozen slush, or thicker ice layers. In addition, it is often interleaved with wet pavement, which is nearly identical in appearance.

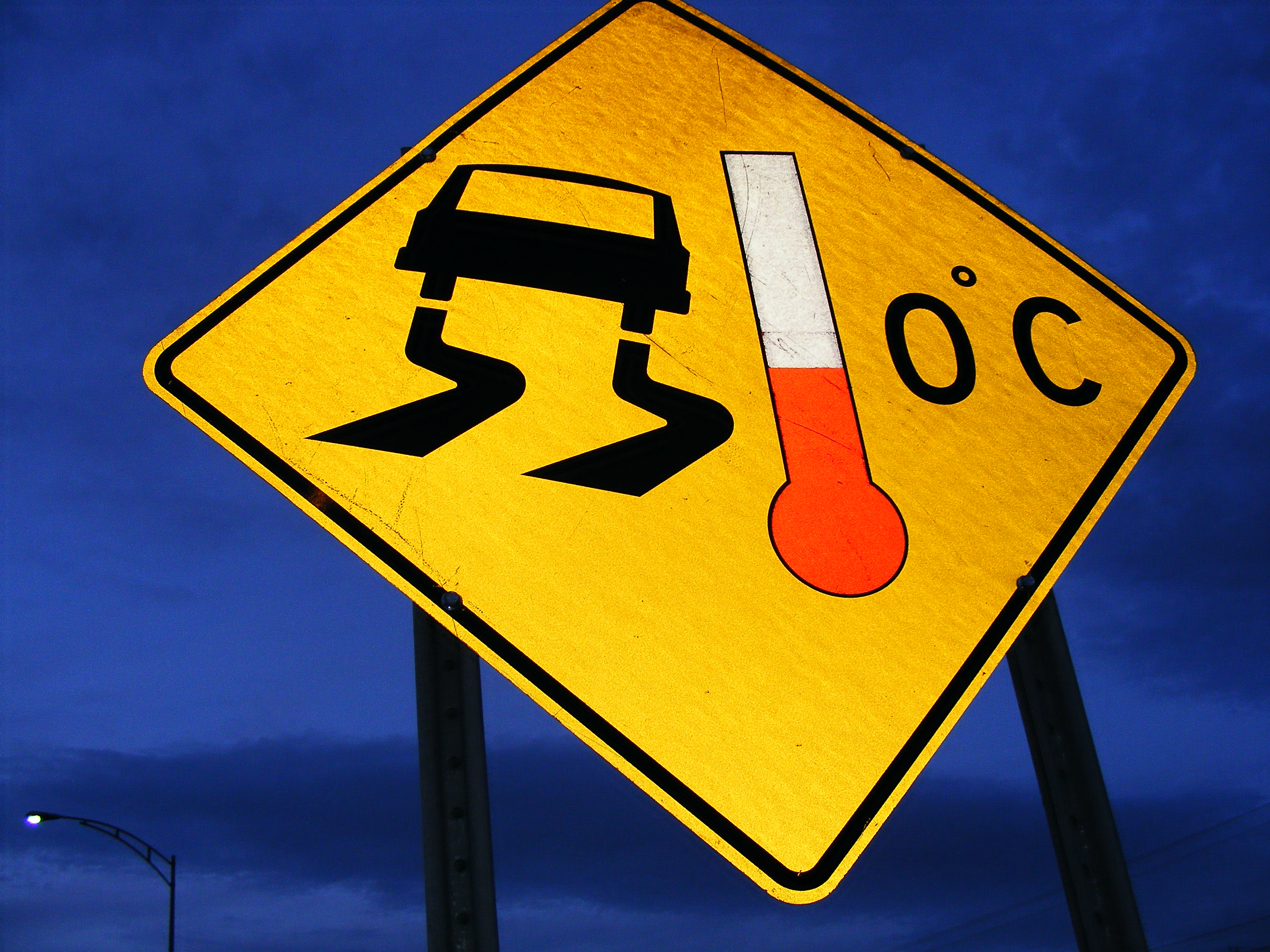
Warning sign for icy pavement in Quebec, Canada

This condition makes driving, cycling or walking on affected surfaces extremely dangerous. Deicing with salt (sodium chloride) is effective down to temperatures of about −18 °C (0 °F). Other compounds such as magnesium chloride or calcium chloride have been used for extremely cold temperatures since the freezing-point depression of their solutions is lower.

At lower temperatures (below −18 °C (0 °F)), black ice can form on roadways when the moisture from automobile exhaust, such as motorcycles and cars, condenses on the road surface.

Such conditions caused multiple accidents in Minnesota when the temperatures dipped below that point for a prolonged period of time in mid-December 2008. Salt's ineffectiveness at melting ice at these temperatures compounds the problem. Black ice may form even when the ambient temperature is several degrees above the freezing point of water 0 °C (32 °F), if the air warms suddenly after a prolonged cold spell that has left the surface of the roadway well below the freezing point of water.

On 1 December 2013, heavy post-Thanksgiving weekend traffic encountered black ice on the westbound I-290 expressway in Worcester, Massachusetts. A chain reaction series of crashes resulted, involving three tractor-trailers and over 60 other vehicles. The ice formed suddenly on a long downward slope, surprising drivers coming over the crest of a hill, who could not see crashed vehicles ahead until it was too late to stop on the slick pavement.

On 11 February 2021, icing in Dallas and Fort Worth, Texas, contributed to a crash on I-35W which authorities called a "mass casualty event". Over 100 cars were involved in the pileup and multiple fatalities were reported.

=== On bridges ===
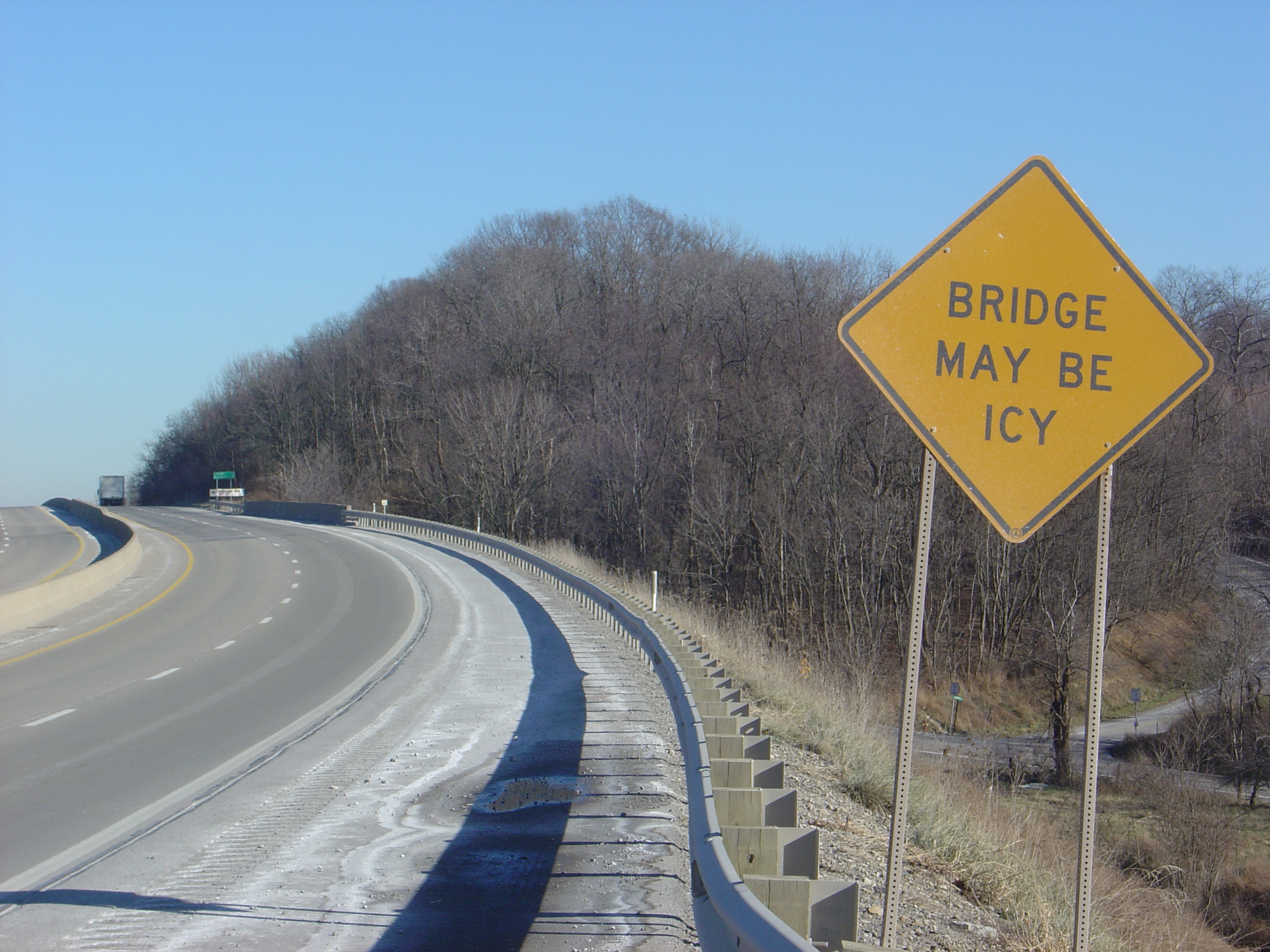
Warning sign for bridge on US highway

Bridges and overpasses can be especially dangerous. Black ice forms first on bridges and overpasses because air can circulate both above and below the surface of the elevated roadway when the ambient temperature drops, causing the pavement temperature on the bridge to fall rapidly.

==== Case study in Minnesota ====
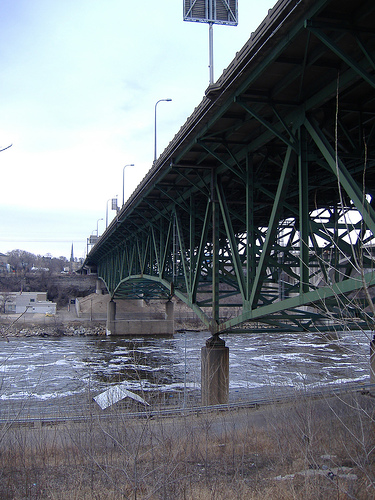
The I-35W Mississippi River bridge seen from below in 2006

The I-35W Mississippi River bridge in Minneapolis, Minnesota, was well known for its black ice before it collapsed in 2007 into the Mississippi River. It had caused several pileups during its 40-year life. The bridge's proximity to the spray of Saint Anthony Falls contributed significantly to the icing problem and the site was noted for frequent spinouts and collisions. On December 19, 1985, the temperature reached −34 °C (−29 °F). Cars crossing the bridge experienced black ice and there was a massive pile up of crashed vehicles on the bridge on the northbound side. In 1996, the bridge was identified as the single most treacherous cold-weather spot in the local freeway system, because of the almost frictionless thin layer of black ice that regularly formed when temperatures dropped below freezing.

By January 1999, Mn/DOT began testing magnesium chloride solutions and a mixture of magnesium chloride and a corn-processing byproduct to see whether either would reduce the black ice that appeared on the bridge during the winter months. In October 1999, the state embedded temperature-activated nozzles in the bridge deck to spray the bridge with potassium acetate solution to keep the area free of winter black ice. The system came into operation in 2000.

=== On water ===
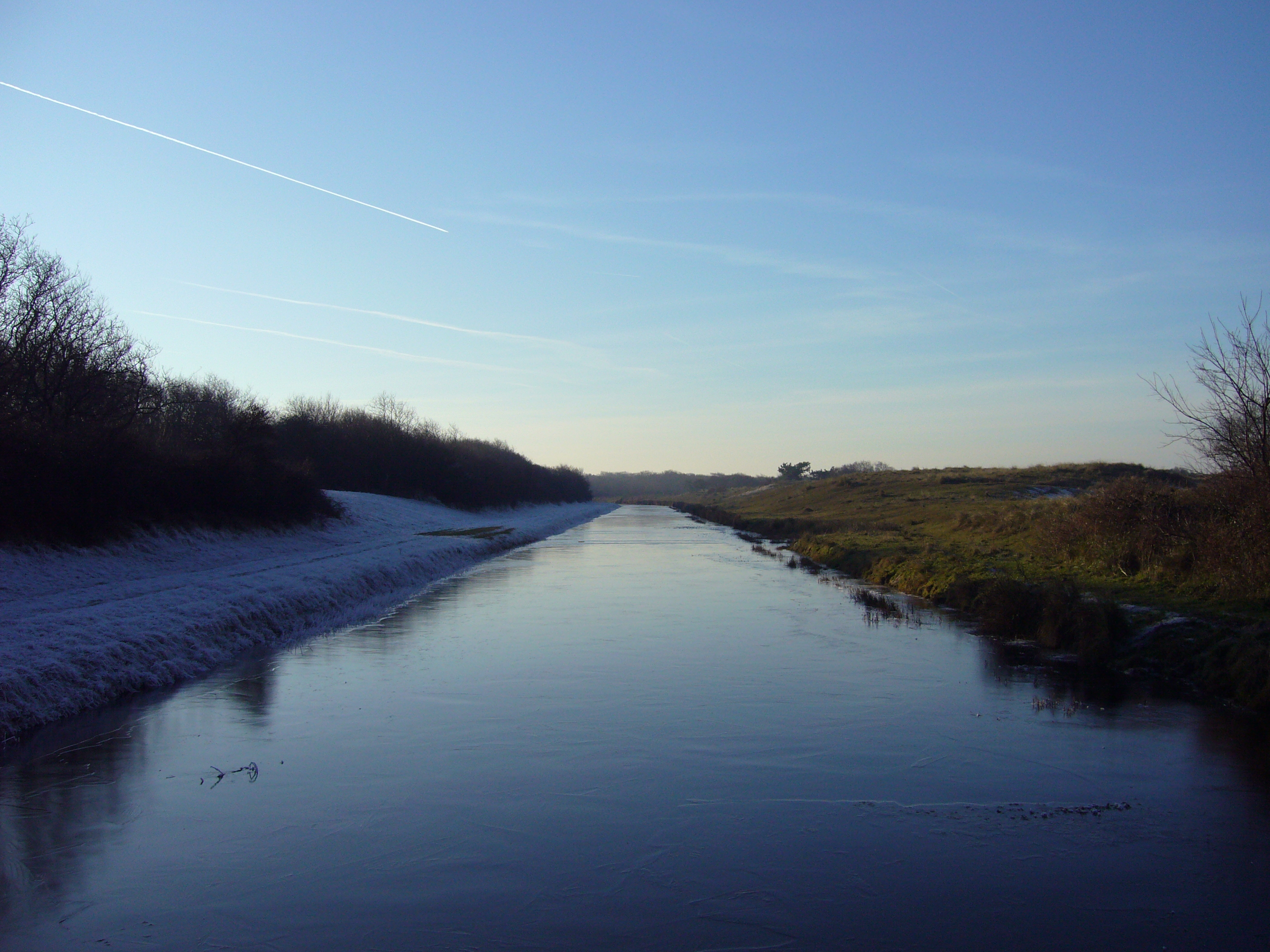
Black ice on a canal in the Netherlands

When the temperature is below freezing and the wind is calm, such as under high atmospheric pressure at night in the fall, a thin layer of ice will form over open water of a lake. If the depth of the body of water is large enough, its color is black and can be seen through the ice, thus the name black ice. On lakes, black ice is also commonly overlain by white ice formed from refrozen snow or slush towards spring. Black ice transmits more light than white ice which can be important for primary producers in lakes, such as phytoplankton. Black ice has a higher bearing capacity than white ice which is important to consider for ice safety reasons when doing recreational activities on lakes, such as ice skating and ice fishing.

Ice can also be formed by seawater spray and water vapour freezing upon contact with a vessel's superstructure when temperature is low enough. Ice formed in this manner is known as rime. As the formation progress, the aboveboard weight of the vessel increases and may ultimately cause capsizing. Furthermore, rime ice may impede the correct functioning of important navigational instruments on board, such as radar or radio installations. Different strategies for the removal of such ice are employed: chipping away the ice or even using fire hoses in an attempt to remove the ice.

=== In mountains ===
Black ice is a significant hazard for climbers and scramblers. Cold weather is common at high altitudes, and black ice quickly forms on rock surfaces. Loss of traction is as sudden and unexpected as on a pavement or road, but can be dangerous if the rock is in an exposed position with a drop below. An ice-axe and crampons are essential use in such circumstances as they will help to prevent a fall, and a belay rope will help to arrest a fall.

== See also ==
- Clear ice
- Congelation ice
- Freezing rain
- Jumble ice
- Rime ice
- Road traffic accident
