= Glaze (ice) =

Coating of ice on objects

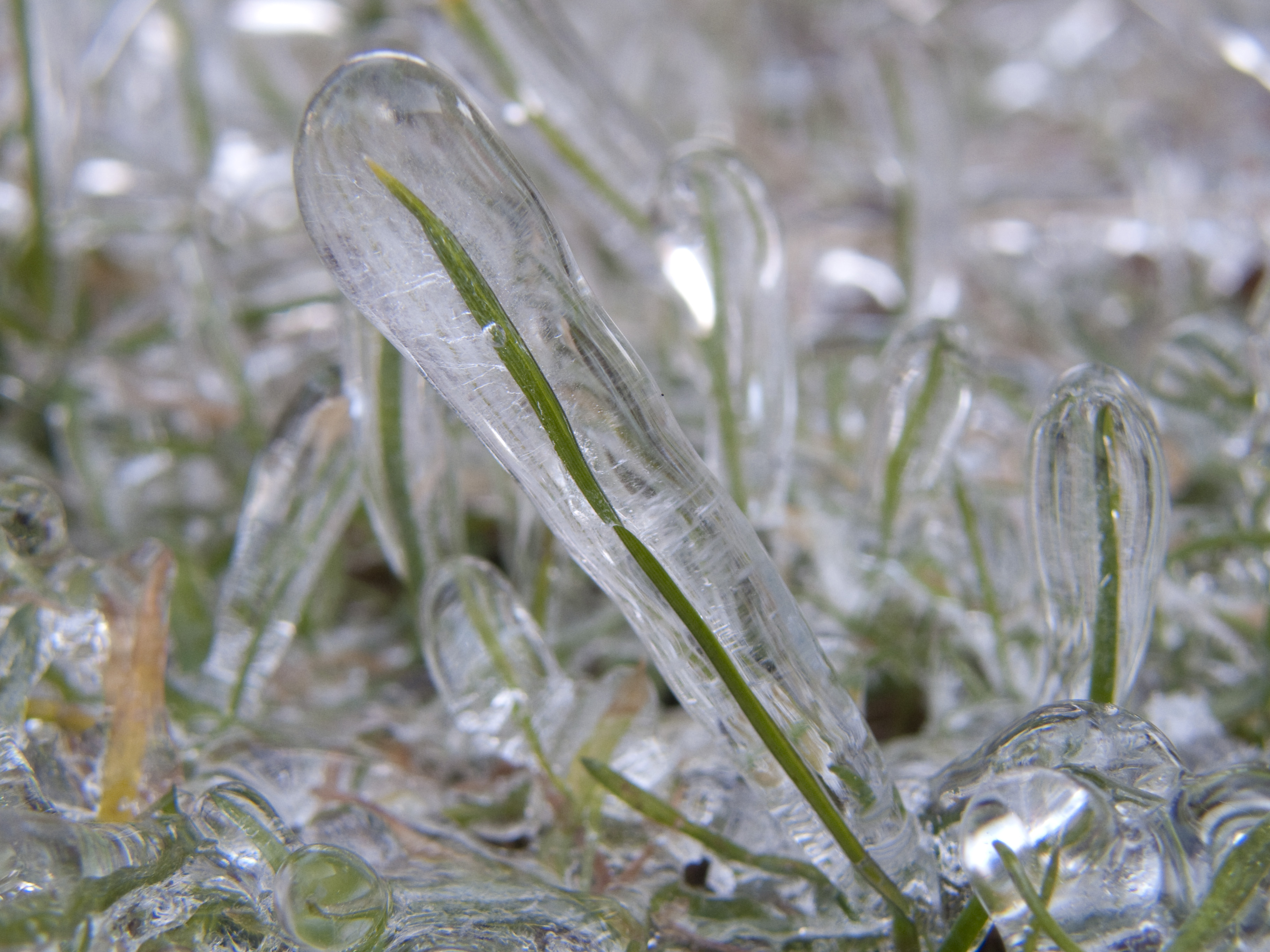
Glaze on a blade of grass

Glaze or glaze ice, also called glazed frost or verglas, is a smooth, transparent and homogeneous ice coating occurring when freezing rain or drizzle hits a surface. It is similar in appearance to clear ice, which forms from supercooled water droplets. It is a relatively common occurrence in temperate climates in the winter when precipitation forms in warm air aloft and falls into below-freezing temperature at the surface.

== Effects ==
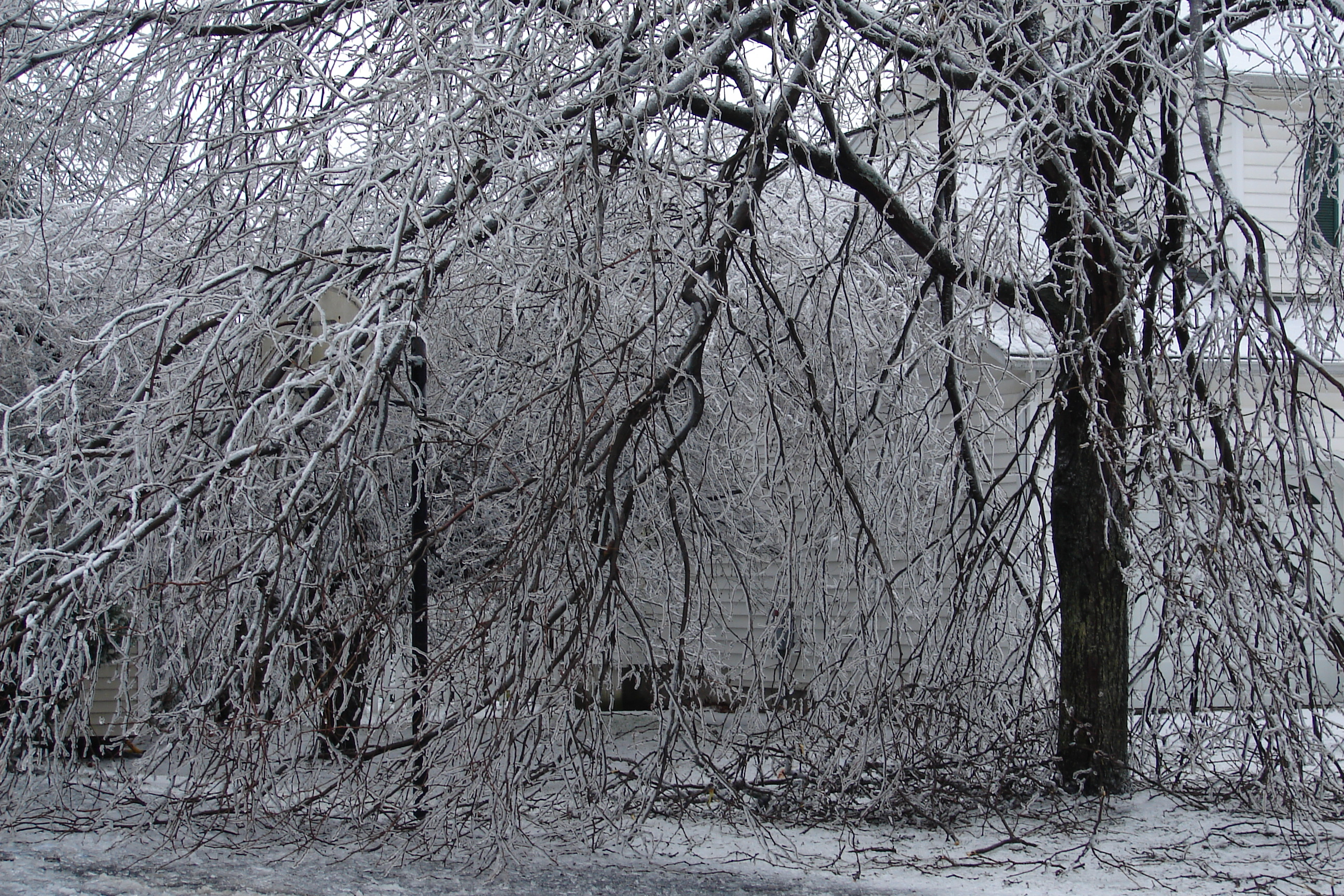
Glazed tree branches are noted for both their beauty and their tendency to snap

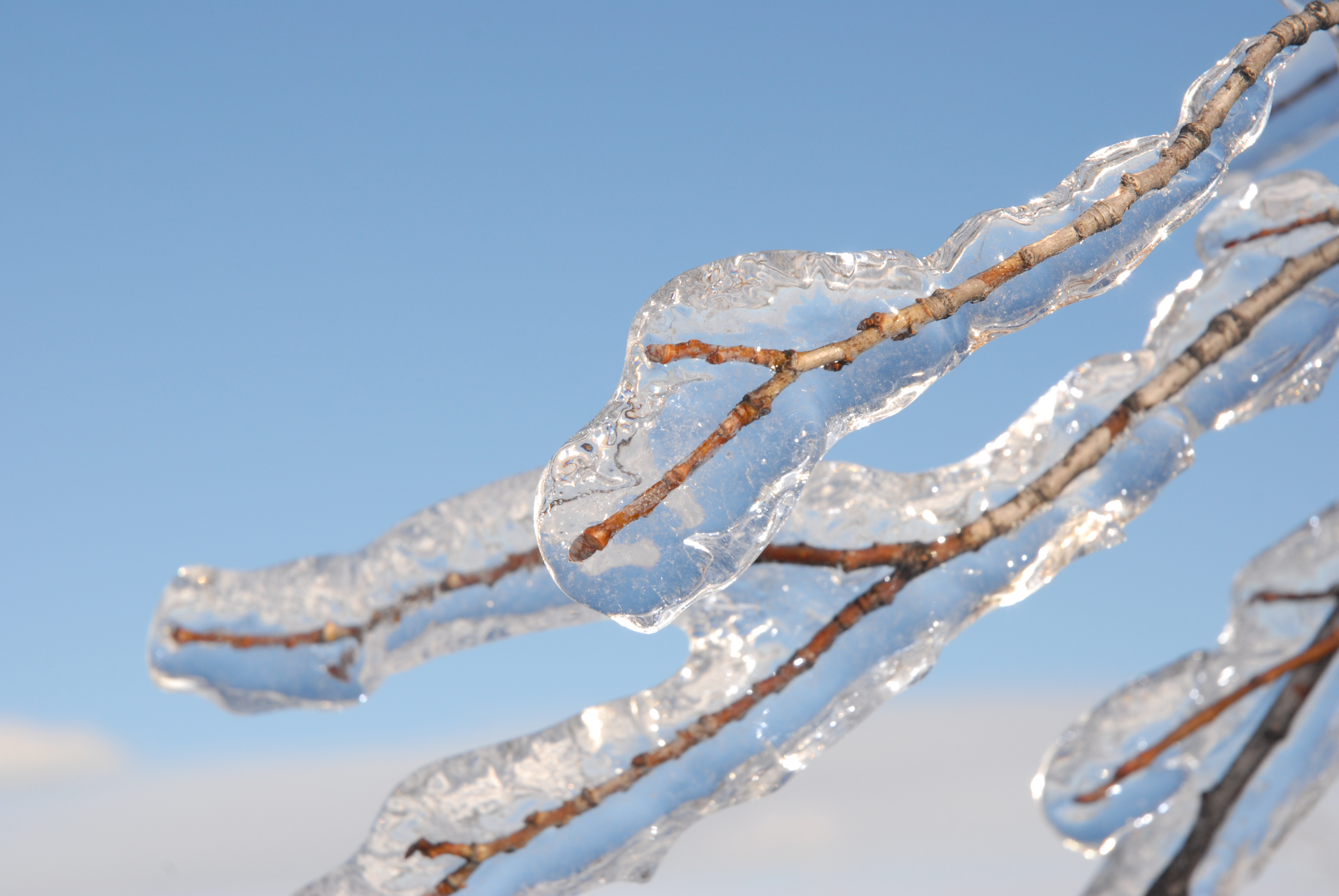
Branch fully encapsulated in glaze

When the freezing rain or drizzle is light and not prolonged, the ice formed is thin. It usually causes only minor damage, relieving trees of their dead branches, etc. When large quantities accumulate, however, it is one of the most dangerous types of winter hazard. When the ice layer exceeds 0.6 cm (0.25 in), tree limbs with branches heavily coated in ice can break off under the enormous weight and fall onto power lines. Windy conditions, when present, will exacerbate the damage. Power lines coated with ice become extremely heavy, causing support poles, insulators, and lines to break. The ice that forms on roadways makes vehicle travel dangerous. Unlike snow, wet ice provides almost no traction, and vehicles will slide even on gentle slopes. Because it conforms to the shape of the ground or object (such as a tree branch or car) it forms on, it is often difficult to notice until it is too late to react.

Glaze from freezing rain on a large scale causes effects on plants that can be severe, as they cannot support the weight of the ice. Trees may snap as they are dormant and fragile during winter weather. Pine trees are also victims of ice storms as their needles will catch the ice, but not be able to support the weight. Orchardists spray water onto budding fruit to simulate glaze as the ice insulates the buds from even lower temperatures. This saves the crop from severe frost damage.

Glaze from freezing rain is also an extreme hazard to aircraft, as it causes very rapid structural icing. Most helicopters and small airplanes lack the necessary deicing equipment to fly in freezing rain of any intensity, and heavy icing can overwhelm even the most sophisticated deicing systems on large airplanes. Icing can dramatically increase an aircraft's weight, and by changing the shape of its airfoils also reduce lift and increase drag. All three factors increase stalling speed and reduce aircraft performance, making it very difficult to climb or even maintain level altitude. Icing is most easily evaded by moving into warmer air—under most conditions, this requires aircraft to descend, which can usually be done safely and easily even with a moderate accumulation of structural ice. However, freezing rain is accompanied by a temperature inversion aloft, meaning that aircraft actually need to climb to move into warmer air—a potentially difficult and dangerous task with even a small amount of ice accumulation.

It is also dangerous to ships owing to the increase in weight when ice forms on the superstructure. It may destabilise a vessel and cause it to overturn, especially in rough seas.

== Examples of damage ==
In February 1994, a severe ice storm caused over $1 billion in damage in the Southern United States, primarily in Mississippi, Tennessee, and Alabama. One particularly severe ice storm struck eastern Canada and northern parts of New York and New England in the North American ice storm of 1998.

Another example of the effect of glaze occurred during a freezing rain event during the unusually severe winter of 2009–2010 in the United Kingdom. Heavy snow had fallen over much of the country in late December and early January. By the second week of January, many of the roads and pavements had been cleared by local councils due to the use of rock salt gritting. However, during the early hours of 12 January a warm front moved across the country causing freezing rain and heavy glaze, particularly in the South and West Yorkshire areas of Northern England (crucially, this rainfall had stopped before first light). When the local population prepared to set out for work and school, they saw from their windows what appeared to be clear roads and pavements but which were in fact treacherous sheets of black ice. Cars and buses almost immediately encountered extreme difficulty, and emergency services were called to dozens of accidents. Pedestrians in the village of Holmfirth found the only safe way to proceed was to crawl on all fours. Accident and emergency units at hospitals in the Sheffield, Rotherham, and Barnsley areas found themselves inundated by people with broken bones, fractures, and sprains, and many schools were closed as it was judged unsafe for pupils to attempt to make their way there.

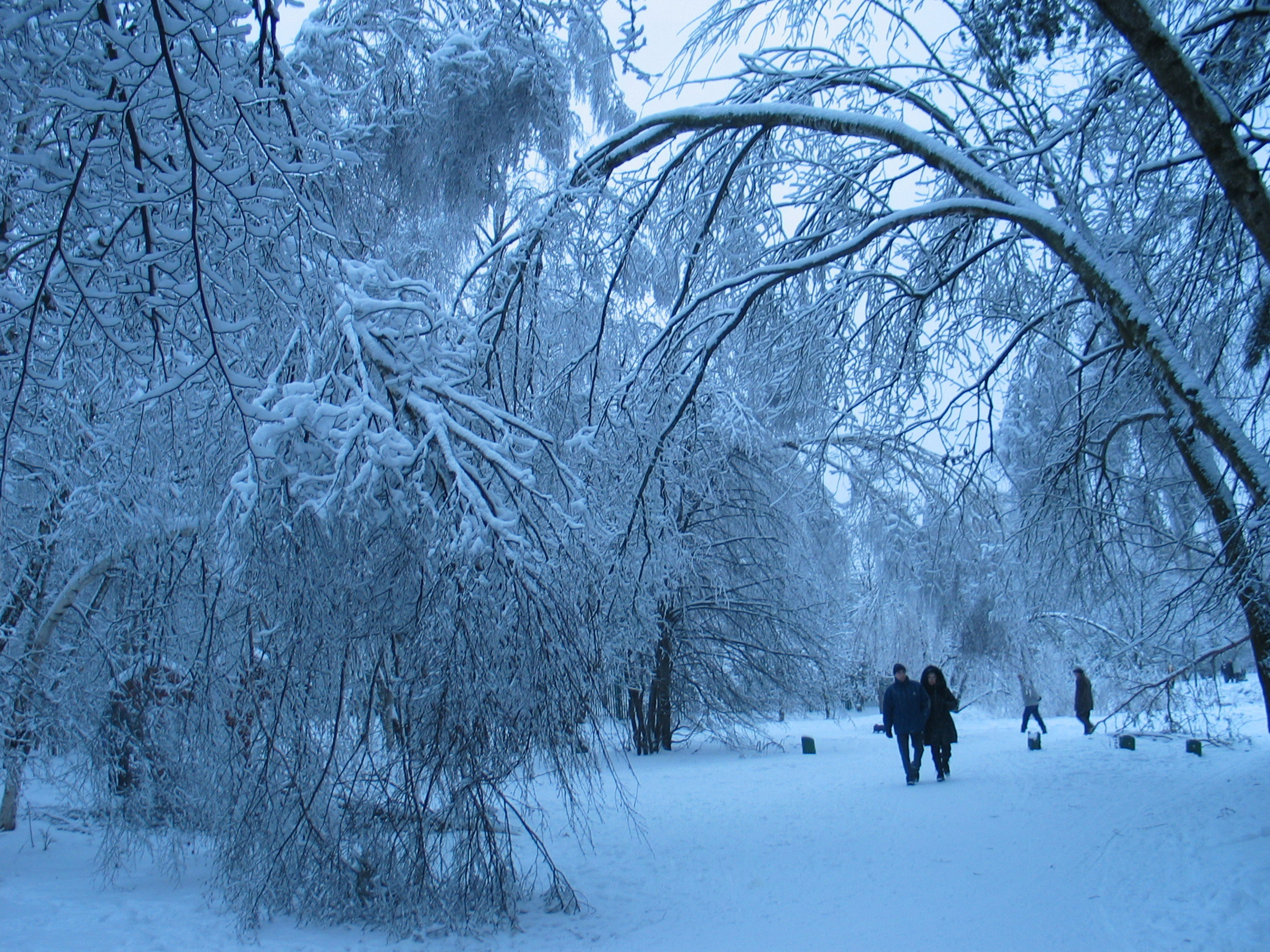
A forest in Moscow a week after an incident of freezing rain

On December 25, 2010, freezing rain fell on Moscow and vicinity. The glaze accumulation caused a number of accidents and power outages, of which the most serious was damage caused to two power lines feeding Domodedovo Airport, causing a complete blackout of the airport and express railway that connected it to the city. As a result, the airport was shut down and hundreds of passengers were stranded inside, with taxi drivers charging up to 10,000 rubles (US$330) for a one-hour drive to the city.

In 1994, American Eagle Flight 4184 encountered heavy air traffic and poor weather that postponed the arrival of this flight at Chicago's O'Hare International Airport, where it was to have landed en route from Indianapolis, Indiana. The ATR-72, a twin-engine turboprop carrying 68 people, entered a holding pattern 65 miles (105 km) southeast of O'Hare. As the plane circled, the freezing rain formed a ridge of glaze on the upper surface of its wings, eventually causing the aircraft's autopilot to suddenly disconnect and the pilots to lose control. The ATR disintegrated on impact with a field below. All passengers and crew were killed.

== See also ==
- Hard rime
- Hoar frost
- Atmospheric icing
- Deicing
- Inversion (meteorology)
- Supercooling
