= Clear ice =

Supercooled water precipitation

Clear ice is a kind of rime ice that can form in nature when the air temperature is between 0 °C (32 °F) and −3 °C (27 °F) by the deposition on exposed surfaces of supercooled, relatively large drops of water (from freezing fog). A rapid accretion and a slow dissipation of latent heat of fusion favor the formation of a transparent ice coating, without air or other impurities. Clear ice is denser and more homogeneous than hard rime; like rime, however, clear ice accumulates on branches and overhead lines, where its relatively high density makes it particularly dangerous.

Clear ice, when formed on the ground, is often called black ice, and can be extremely hazardous. Clear ice can also form naturally in bodies of water during cold temperatures, due to dissolved gases being forced downward into the still liquid water as the ice forms. A similar phenomenon occurs when freezing rain or drizzle hits a surface and is called glaze.

Some specialized ice makers make use of directional freezing in order to produce clear ice for use in drinks and ice sculptures.

== See also ==
- Ice cube#Clear and cloudy
- Ice storm
- SAS Flight 751
