= Freeze gelation =

Freeze-gelation, is a form of sol-gel processing of ceramics that enables a ceramic object to be fabricated in complex shapes, without the need for high-temperature sintering. The process is similar to freeze-casting.

The process is simple, but the science is, as of 2005, not well understood. The most common process involves the mixing of a silica solution with a filler powder. For example, if we were making a component out of alumina, aluminium oxide, then we would still use a silica sol, but alumina filler powder. The relative amounts used differ, normally between 3 and 4 times more filler than sol is added by weight.

A wetting agent is added, such that the filler powder disperses properly in the sol, which is mostly water. This makes the mixture doughy and stiff. The mixture is, however, highly thixotropic, so that when vibrated it turns liquid. The stiff dough is placed in a mold and the mold vibrated to liquefy the mixture, filling the mold and releasing any trapped air.

The filled mold is then frozen. On freezing, silica precipitates from the sol, forming a gel. This gel holds the filler powder together in something approximating a sintering greenform. The component is then dried in a furnace, leaving the component.

The advantages of freeze-geleation over sintering are essentially cost-based. It doesn't require high pressure equipment or powerful furnaces (drying temperatures are only just above water's boiling point), yet it creates a useful product which takes the shape of the mold very accurately.

== History ==
In terms of being simply a process by which powder can be made into a monolith, freeze casting could be as old as the earth. A material called laminar opaline silica or LOS is believed to be formed by the freeze casting of volcanic ash, some soils containing the required sols to make the gel.

Artificially it is also an old process, having been known and studied for 100 years or more, but never brought to significant industrial application. Lottermoser, a German, wrote a paper on 'das Ausfrieren von Hydrosolen' (the Freezing of Hydrosols) in 1908. Through the 20th century various people have patented techniques using freeze-gelation, most being centred on the use of ceramics as refractory materials. A furnace lining brick, or an investment casting mold, can be easily fabricated using this method.

Recently there was a flurry of interest in freeze-casting at the University of Bath, UK, which led most significantly to two doctoral theses, by J. Laurie in 1995 and by M. Statham in 1998. Taken together in chronological order, these form a good introduction to the technique for the interested party.

== Applications ==
To consider the applications of freeze-casting, we should consider the properties of the freeze-cast component. First, and critically, it is not fully dense. It contains only about 60–70% solid matter, the remainder being air in the form of porosity. This in turn leads to an interesting property of freeze-castings – they are often porous, not merely at the surface, but throughout their thickness. A fluid will penetrate through the pores in the casting and eventually soak through, like a sponge. This is because at porosity percentages above the 'pore percolation threshold', pores link up into continuous channels. The pore percolation threshold depends on the characteristics of the material, but it is normally very roughly around 20%. A 60% dense component has 40% porosity.

As we might expect, this amount of air in the component reduces its strength a lot. Pure, fully dense alumina, for example, is as strong as steel – far stronger if processed carefully – but freeze-cast alumina components are of similar strength to concrete. The freeze-cast component also tends to be brittle, fracturing easily.

It is unlikely then that freeze-cast components could be used structurally (without further processing – more later), but they have other properties that make them useful. They are rather light, with freeze-cast alumina components having a density somewhere in the region of 2.5 g/cm^{3}, similar to aluminium. They are easy and cheap to make, from inexpensive and safe ingredients and using no dangerous equipment. They can take complex shapes, as they are cast, rather than machined. They can also be very large, probably larger than monolithic ceramic components made by any other process. Finally, and crucially, their porosity means that they can be infiltrated by materials with useful properties, or processed with other materials in. For example, the component could be dipped in molten copper, such that the copper is drawn up by capillary action into the porosity, increasing the conductivity of the component vastly. Alternatively, copper powder could be used as a filler powder in place of some alumina to the same end.

Freeze-cast components, in their basic form, are ideal for use as heat-resisting objects. In this way, they can be useful in metalwork, as molds or as substrates for metal spray-forming. However, with suitable post-processing, they could fulfil many other applications, such as silicon chip mounts, or even engine blocks.

== Theory ==
The science is not particularly well understood. It has been known for years that silica sols (also known as colloidal silica, silicic acid, polysilicic acid) will gel when exposed to temperatures around 0 °C (32 °F). The theoretical mechanism is quite simple:

Colloidal silica is produced by the polymerisation of monosilicic acid, Si(OH)_{4}, until the chains of polysilicic acid become so long they form silica particles with hydroxylated surfaces. On freezing of the sol, the silica particles are rejected away from the solidifying interface and forced into the interstices between the ice crystals. Here, they come into contact with each other, and link via the condensation of their surface hydroxyl groups into siloxane bonds. This, happening throughout the sol, forms a gel.

In a filled sol, the ceramic powder is trapped within the gel, and forms a monolith.
