= Directional freezing =

Thermodynamic process

Directional freezing freezes from only one direction.

Directional freezing can freeze water, from only one direction or side of a container, into clear ice.

Directional freezing in a domestic freezer can be done by putting water in a insulated container so that the water freezes from the top down, and removing before fully frozen, so that the minerals in the water are not frozen.

F Hoffmann La Roche AG, Roche Diagnostics GmbH has a 2017 directional freezing patent for drying solid material.

== See also ==
- Aquamelt
- Clear ice
- Hydrogel
- Freeze-casting§Static vs. dynamic freezing profiles
- Molecular self-assembly
