= Thomas Elkins =

African-American dentist, abolitionist, surgeon, pharmacist and inventor

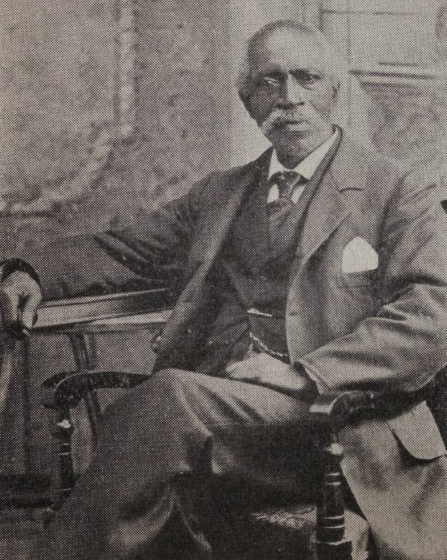

Thomas Elkins (1818 - 1819 February - August 10, 1900) was an African-American dentist, abolitionist, surgeon, pharmacist, and inventor. He lived in Albany, New York, for most of his life, but travelled during his service as the medical examiner of the 54th and 55th Massachusetts infantries and visited Liberia. Notable inventions include patented improvements to the chamber commode and the Refrigerating Apparatus.

== Career ==
In the late 1800s, the number of African-Americans in pharmacy work increased, particularly in the South where there was a greater African American population. Elkins was part of one of the first wave of African-Americans in pharmacy. He received his education in pharmacy from a Doctor Wynkoop, a "physician, and druggist of the old school," and spent about ten years working with him. Elkins then ran a small drugstore, located on North Swan Street in Albany, New York and later on the corner of Broadway and Livingston Avenue, also in Albany. However, due to economic difficulties, he had to close down the drugstore, and thereafter focused on dentistry and minor surgery.

He trained Thomas H. Sands Pennington, the stepson of Aboltionist James W.C. Pennington and helped Thomas land a position in the pharmacy of H.B. Clement, where Thomas Pennington went on to have a distinguished career.

Elkins studied dentistry under a Doctor Charles Payne who practiced medicine in both Albany and Montreal. Elkins then studied surgery with one Doctor Marsh, also of Albany.

== Abolitionist work ==
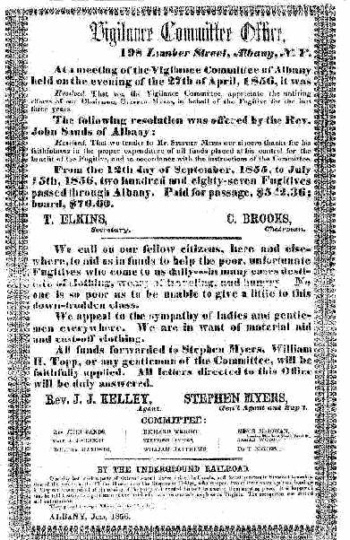
1856 Albany Vigilance Committee flyer identifying Elkins as secretary, and asking citizens to donate to the cause of fugitive slaves.

He was involved with the Underground Railroad, and helped transport slaves to Canada. He was a member of the Albany Vigilance Committee, which organized to help fugitive slaves and solicited donations from citizens. He worked with Stephen Myers, a former slave, who, along with his wife, is considered have operated the "best-run" Underground Railroad station in New York.

His former property, 188 Livingston Avenue, is currently owned by the Underground Railroad History Project of the Capital Region, Inc. They also own the Myers house and several other properties from the era.

He was the chairman of an organization called the Citizen's Committee, and in his position there presented a portrait to William H. Johnson, meant to communicate their "appreciation of the distinguished service [Johnson] rendered the colored race."

== Civil War service and later travels ==
During the Civil War (1861–65), Elkins was appointed by Gov. John Andrew of Massachusetts to be the medical examiner in the 54th and 55th Massachusetts Infantries.

Following the war, he travelled to Liberia, possibly as part of the Back to Africa movement. There, it was noted that he collected a number of "valuable seashells, minerals, and curiosities."

== Inventions ==
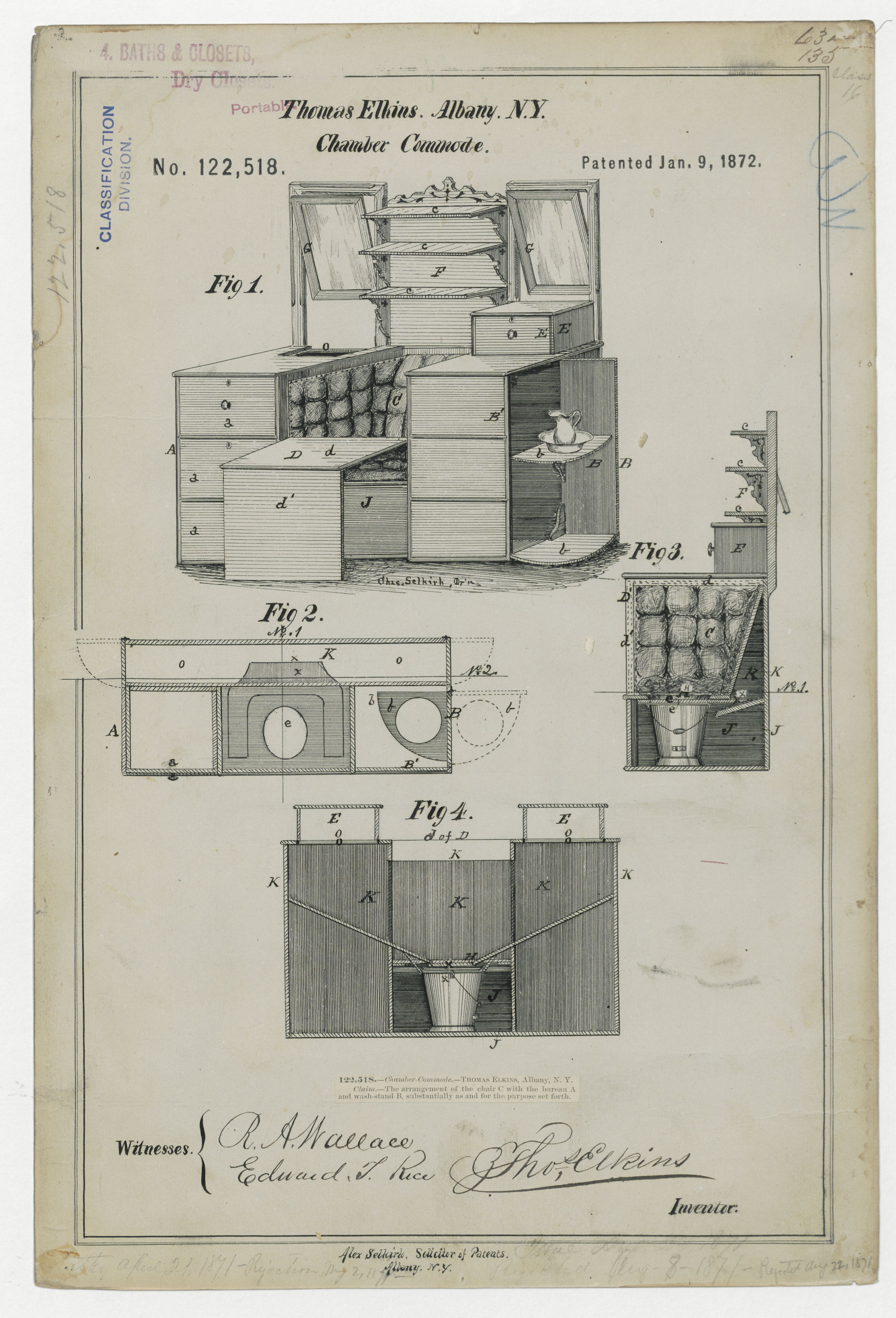
Thomas Elkins' design for a 'chamber commode', which combined a chamber pot with a 'bureau, mirror, book-rack, wash stand, table and easy-chair'

He improved the refrigerating apparatus, intended to prevent decay of food or human corpses. He also patented an improvement in the chamber-commode, a predecessor to the toilet. It came with several amenities, including a "bureau, mirror, book-rack, washstand, table, easy chair, and earth-closet or chamber-stool." Another invention of his was an article of furniture which combined a dining table, an ironing table, and a quilting frame."

== Death ==
Elkins died August 10, 1900, and is buried at Albany Rural Cemetery.

== See also ==
Stephen and Harriet Myers House
List of African-American inventors and scientists
