= Jumble ice =

Irregular jagged ice formed over water

Jumble ice is a phenomenon that occurs when ice atop a river or other flowing body of water fractures due to the different flow rates beneath the ice. On a lake, pond, or other stationary body of water, ice forms undisturbed and generally does not move as long as the entire surface of the body of water is frozen. When a river freezes, water flow typically continues beneath the ice, exerting pressure on it. If the ice fractures, pieces of ice torn free by the river's current will collide with stationary or slower-moving pieces. After becoming stuck in place, the loosened pieces of ice refreeze irregularly, causing a rough, or jumbled, surface.

In general, the faster a body of water flows beneath ice, the more likely it is to develop jumble ice. Temperatures near the freezing point also tend to cause jumble ice, as the higher temperatures weaken the ice structure, allowing for more pieces to be torn free before refreezing. The Yukon River in Alaska often exhibits jumble ice during the winter.

Jumble ice is a hazard for winter travelers, as the broken "ground" formed by the jumble ice can cause snowmachine accidents or injuries to sled dogs.

== See also ==
- Ice jacking
- Ice dam
