= Climate of San Diego =

San Diego

Climate chart (precipitation, max. and min. temperature)
J	F	M	A	M	J	J	A	S	O	N	D
2 66 47	2.3 67 49	1.8 68 53	0.8 68 56	0.1 69 59	0.1 71 62	0 75 65	0 76 67	0.2 76 65	0.6 73 61	1 69 54	1.5 65 45
- █ Average max. and min. temperatures in °F
- █ Precipitation totals in inches
- Source: NWS
Metric conversion
J	F	M	A	M	J	J	A	S	O	N	D
50 19 8	58 19 10	46 20 12	20 20 13	3 20 15	2 22 17	0.8 24 19	0.5 24 19	3.8 24 18	14 23 16	26 21 12	39 18 7
- █ Average max. and min. temperatures in °C
- █ Precipitation totals in mm

The climate of San Diego, California, is classified as a hot-summer Mediterranean climate (Köppen climate classification Csa). While the basic climate features hot, sunny, and dry summers, and cooler, wetter winters, San Diego is more arid than the typical Mediterranean climate and consists of relatively dry winters compared to other zones with this type of climate. The climate at San Diego International Airport, the location for official weather reports for San Diego, as well as the climate at most beach areas, straddles the border between BSh and BSk due to the mild winters and cool summers in these locations.

== Temperatures ==
Average monthly temperatures range from 57.3 °F (14.1 °C) in January to 72 °F (22 °C) in August. On average, 344 days a year are hotter than 60 °F (16 °C), but only 25 days are hotter than 80 °F (27 °C).

Late summer and early autumn are typically the hottest times of the year with an average high of 78 °F (26 °C) in August and 77 °F (25 °C) in September. Temperatures occasionally reach 90 °F (32 °C) or higher. Snow and ice are rare in the wintertime, typically occurring only inland from the coast when present.

San Diego experiences marine layer clouds, most often between May and August, which cause cool temperatures, cloudy weather and fog in the morning. Marine layer conditions linger until the heat of the sun becomes strong enough to evaporate the clouds. The local sayings "May gray" and "June gloom" refer to the way in which San Diego has the most trouble shaking off the early morning fog during those months, and cool, cloudy conditions often last into the afternoon or even all day.

Temperatures soar to very high readings only on rare occasions, chiefly when easterly winds (known as the "Santa Ana winds") bring hot, dry air from the inland deserts. This marks October as fire season for San Diego and the rest of Southern California due to low precipitation and sporadic heat waves that the average monthly temperatures do not immediately show. For example, the months with the highest record high temperatures are September at 111 °F (44 °C) and October at 107 °F (42 °C).

The record high temperature at the National Weather Service office in San Diego of 111 °F (44 °C) was on September 26, 1963. The record low temperature was 25 °F (−4 °C) on January 7, 1913. The record high temperature was tied only once and happened on September 27, 2010, 47 years and two days after the set record. Several cities near San Diego, including Los Angeles, broke their all-time records that day.

== Precipitation ==
San Diego on average has 146 sunny days and 117 partly cloudy days a year. The average annual precipitation is less than 12 inches (30 cm), resulting in a borderline arid climate. Rainfall is strongly concentrated in the cooler half of the year, particularly the months December through March, although precipitation is lower than any other part of the U.S. west coast. While the summer months are virtually rainless, subtropical moisture from the North American monsoon usually results in increased humidity and thunderstorms for at least a few days each summer. Rainfall is highly variable from year to year and from month to month, and San Diego is subject to both droughts and floods. While hurricanes are very rare, San Diego receives more tropical storms and remnants of tropical storms than anywhere else in California. Famous examples include the 1858 San Diego hurricane, the 1939 California tropical storm, the remnants of Hurricane Kathleen in 1976, and Hurricane Hilary in 2023, all of which brought several inches of rain and high winds to San Diego. Inland areas like El Cajon can receive over 20 inches (51 cm) per year on average; further inland at higher elevations in the Cleveland National Forest receive more yet, and some areas like Palomar Mountain average more than 40 inches (100 cm) of rainfall per year.

At the National Weather Service office, there are an average of 41 days with measurable precipitation. The wettest year was 1941 with 24.93 inches (633 mm; 63.3 cm) and the driest year was 1953 with 3.23 inches (8.2 cm; 82 mm). The most rainfall in one month was 9.09 inches (23.1 cm; 231 mm) in January 1993. The most rainfall in 24 hours was 3.23 inches (8.2 cm; 82 mm) on April 5, 1926.

== Snow ==
Snow has been recorded falling on lowland San Diego communities only five times in over 125 years of record-keeping. Snow flurries were last seen in San Diego on February 14, 2008 around 1,700 to 1,800 feet (520 to 550 m), and the last measurable snowfall to hit various neighborhoods and suburbs around the city fell on December 13, 1967. In winter, light snow is common in mountainous regions of east and north San Diego County (including Ramona and Julian) above 3,000–4,000 feet (910–1,220 m).

== Variation ==
Climate in the San Diego area often varies dramatically over short geographical distances, due to the city's topography (the Bay, and the numerous hills, mountains, and canyons), thus exhibiting microclimate: frequently, particularly during the "May gray / June gloom" period, a thick "marine layer" cloud cover will keep the air cool and damp within a few miles of the coast, but will yield to bright cloudless sunshine between about 5 and 15 miles (8 and 24 km) inland—the cities of El Cajon and Santee for example, rarely experience the cloud cover.

== Compared to national averages ==
On average, San Diego sees 21 days with some precipitation while the rest of the country sees about 110. The national average for mostly sunny days is 213 while San Diego's is 267. San Diego's annual snowfall is 0 centimeters or 0 inches per year while the nation usually sees an average of 24.2 inches (610 mm) per year. The United States average for days above 90 °F (32 °C) is 37.9 days while San Diego's is only 2.5 days, and there are, on average 0 days below 32 °F (0 °C) in San Diego, while the national average is 88 days. The average low temperature in January for the country is 26.5 °F (−3.1 °C), and for San Diego it is 50 °F (10 °C). The average high temperature in July for San Diego is 76 °F (24 °C). The national average is 86.8 °F (30.4 °C).

== Data ==
Climate data for San Diego Int'l Airport (1991–2020 normals, (Note: Mean monthly maxima and minima (i.e. the highest and lowest temperature readings during an entire month or year) calculated based on data at said location from 1991 to 2020.) extremes 1874–present) (Note: Official precipitation records for San Diego were kept at the Weather Bureau Office in downtown from October 1850 to December 1859 at the Mission San Diego and from November 1871 to June 1939 and a variety of buildings at downtown, and at San Diego Int'l (Lindbergh Field) since July 1939. Temperature records, however, only date from October 1874. For more information on data coverage, see ThreadEx)
Month	Jan	Feb	Mar	Apr	May	Jun	Jul	Aug	Sep	Oct	Nov	Dec	Year
Record high °F (°C)	88 (31)	91 (33)	99 (37)	98 (37)	98 (37)	101 (38)	100 (38)	98 (37)	111 (44)	107 (42)	100 (38)	88 (31)	111 (44)
Mean maximum °F (°C)	78.8 (26.0)	78.6 (25.9)	80.2 (26.8)	82.1 (27.8)	79.3 (26.3)	79.6 (26.4)	82.9 (28.3)	85.2 (29.6)	90.6 (32.6)	87.8 (31.0)	85.4 (29.7)	77.0 (25.0)	94.0 (34.4)
Mean daily maximum °F (°C)	66.4 (19.1)	66.2 (19.0)	67.0 (19.4)	68.8 (20.4)	69.5 (20.8)	71.7 (22.1)	75.3 (24.1)	77.3 (25.2)	77.2 (25.1)	74.6 (23.7)	70.7 (21.5)	66.0 (18.9)	70.9 (21.6)
Daily mean °F (°C)	58.4 (14.7)	59.0 (15.0)	60.7 (15.9)	62.9 (17.2)	64.8 (18.2)	67.2 (19.6)	70.7 (21.5)	72.4 (22.4)	71.7 (22.1)	68.1 (20.1)	62.7 (17.1)	57.9 (14.4)	64.7 (18.2)
Mean daily minimum °F (°C)	50.3 (10.2)	51.8 (11.0)	54.5 (12.5)	57.1 (13.9)	60.0 (15.6)	62.6 (17.0)	66.1 (18.9)	67.5 (19.7)	66.2 (19.0)	61.5 (16.4)	54.8 (12.7)	49.8 (9.9)	58.5 (14.7)
Mean minimum °F (°C)	43.7 (6.5)	46.1 (7.8)	48.7 (9.3)	51.9 (11.1)	55.8 (13.2)	59.3 (15.2)	63.0 (17.2)	63.9 (17.7)	61.8 (16.6)	55.5 (13.1)	48.2 (9.0)	43.0 (6.1)	42.6 (5.9)
Record low °F (°C)	25 (−4)	34 (1)	36 (2)	39 (4)	45 (7)	50 (10)	54 (12)	54 (12)	50 (10)	43 (6)	36 (2)	32 (0)	25 (−4)
Average precipitation inches (mm)	1.98 (50)	2.20 (56)	1.46 (37)	0.65 (17)	0.28 (7.1)	0.05 (1.3)	0.08 (2.0)	0.01 (0.25)	0.12 (3.0)	0.50 (13)	0.79 (20)	1.67 (42)	9.79 (249)
Average precipitation days (≥ 0.01 in)	6.5	7.1	6.2	3.8	2.2	0.7	0.7	0.3	0.9	2.4	3.7	5.8	40.3
Average relative humidity (%)	63.1	65.7	67.3	67.0	70.6	74.0	74.6	74.1	72.7	69.4	66.3	63.7	69.0
Average dew point °F (°C)	42.8 (6.0)	45.3 (7.4)	47.3 (8.5)	49.5 (9.7)	53.1 (11.7)	57.0 (13.9)	61.2 (16.2)	62.4 (16.9)	60.6 (15.9)	55.6 (13.1)	48.6 (9.2)	43.2 (6.2)	52.2 (11.2)
Mean monthly sunshine hours	239.3	227.4	261.0	276.2	250.5	242.4	304.7	295.0	253.3	243.4	230.1	231.3	3,054.6
Percentage possible sunshine	75	74	70	71	58	57	70	71	68	69	73	74	69
Source: NOAA (sun, relative humidity, and dew point 1961–1990)

See or edit raw graph data.

== Sea temperatures ==
Average annual temperature of sea is 65 °F (18 °C), from 59 °F (15 °C) in January to 72 °F (22 °C) in August. Water temperatures have risen since 1950 as measured at Scripps Pier.

Average sea temperature
Jan	Feb	Mar	Apr	May	Jun	Jul	Aug	Sep	Oct	Nov	Dec
59 °F (15 °C)	61 °F (16 °C)	61 °F (16 °C)	62 °F (17 °C)	64 °F (18 °C)	67 °F (19 °C)	70 °F (21 °C)	72 °F (22 °C)	70 °F (21 °C)	68 °F (20 °C)	65 °F (18 °C)	62 °F (17 °C)

== Santa Anas ==
The months of September through April bring warm winds from the desert called "Santa Anas". Occurring about 10 days out of the year, these winds bring sometimes hot, but always dry conditions. Inland, and in mountain passes and canyons, they can burst out in gusts of 100 miles per hour (160 km/h) and can lower relative humidity to single digits, although by the coast they rarely see gusts of over 40 miles per hour (64 km/h). They can spread and worsen wildfires. Because these winds blow from east to west, common perception is that they are pulling hot air from the desert. However, it is not uncommon during a Santa Ana condition for the coast to be even hotter than the desert regions. The Santa Ana winds are actually warm due to barometric pressure increases: As the air is pulled down to sea level from the higher altitudes of the Great Basin and Rocky Mountains to the east, it is compressed and its temperature rises.

== Hurricanes ==
Since the track of most hurricanes is well to the south of San Diego, and the cold California Current (normally sea temperatures are only in the upper 60's °F or 18 to 21 °C off the CA coast) keeps ocean water significantly colder than in the Gulf of Mexico and western Atlantic (often sea temperatures over 28 °C or 82 °F), tropical cyclones rarely impact San Diego. Most northwestward moving tropical cyclones dissipate over Baja California and fail to bring any precipitation to San Diego. The only tropical cyclone known to impact San Diego as a hurricane in around 200 years of record-keeping was the 1858 San Diego hurricane. Two more cyclones managed to bring tropical storm-force winds to Southern California: the 1939 California tropical storm and Hurricane Kathleen (1976). Average surface temperature of the water at Scripps Pier in the California Current has increased by almost 3 degrees since 1950, according to scientists at the Scripps Institution of Oceanography.

== May and June clouds ==
During the months of May and June, the marine layer brings cloudiness that covers coastal and nearby inland communities. Some call it "May Gray", or "June Gloom".

== Southern Oscillation ==
San Diego's wet winter season is influenced by the El Niño Southern Oscillation. During the El Niño phase, San Diego receives more winter storms with warmer and more humid conditions. During the La Niña phase, San Diego becomes drier with cooler and less humid conditions.

== Ultraviolet index ==
Ultraviolet index
Jan	Feb	Mar	Apr	May	Jun	Jul	Aug	Sep	Oct	Nov	Dec	Year
3	4	6	8	9	10	10	10	8	6	4	3	6.7

== See also ==
- Climate of California
- Horse latitudes
