= Actinoform cloud =

Type of marine cloud

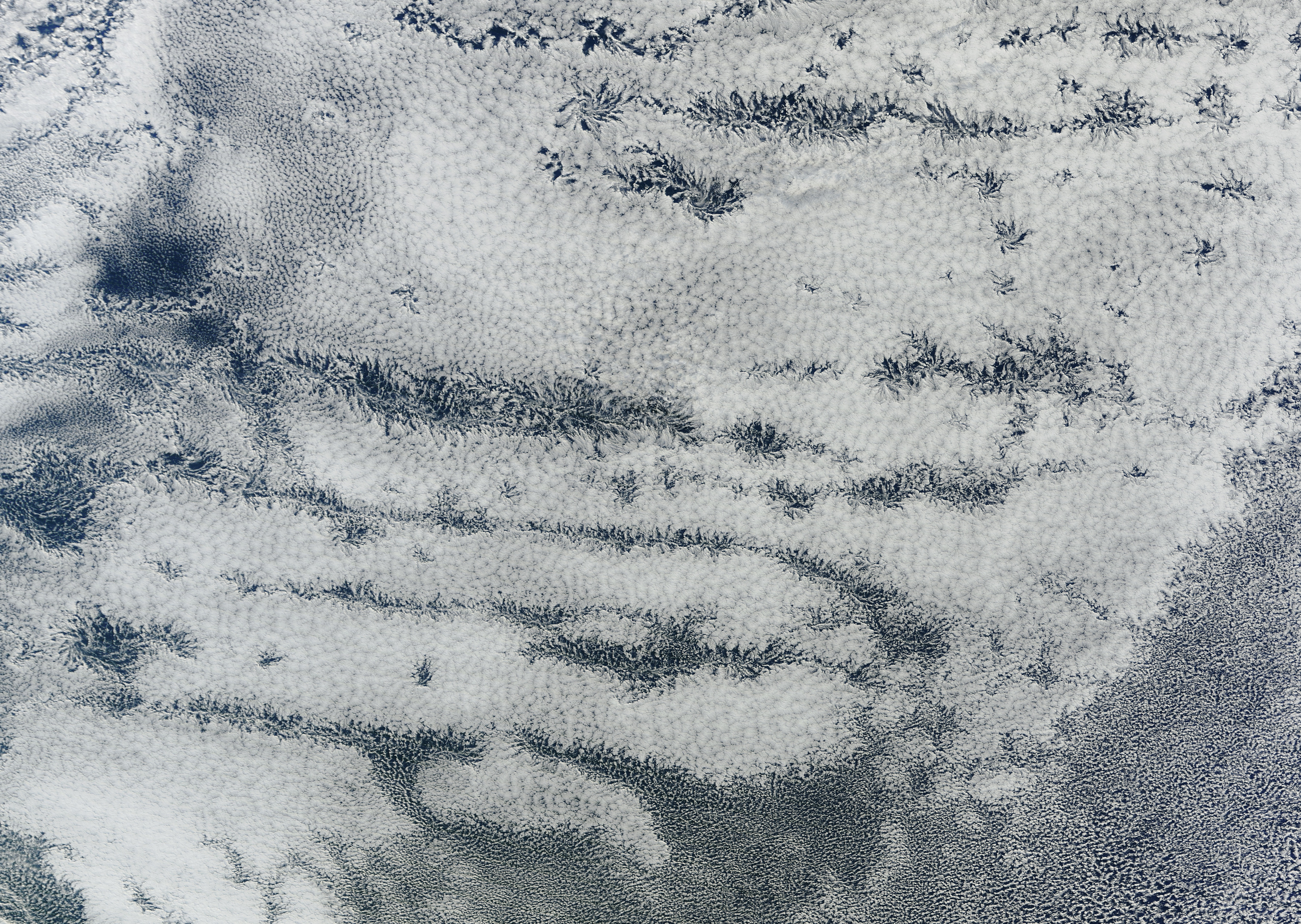
Actinoform clouds as seen from a weather satellite

An actinoform or actiniform describes a collection of marine, low-level clouds that take a distinct shape. They are named after the Greek word for "ray" due to their radial structure. Actinoform clouds can spread out over 300 km (190 mi) across and thus cannot be easily seen with the naked eye. In addition, actinoform clouds can form "trains" that are up to six times the length of the original cloud field, yet they maintain their own distinct identity.

== Description ==
In a satellite image, they look like distinct leaf-like or spokes-on-a-wheel patterns that stand out from the rest of the low-lying cloud field. However, why they have this shape or how they are formed is not known, but recent evidence suggests that the interaction of both radiation and precipitation may help to organize them on the mesoscale. The individual convective cells that collectively make up an actinoform cloud are quite shallow, with heights generally less than 2 km (1 mi), and would be classified as stratocumulus clouds by an observer on the ground. Given the extensive mesoscale organization of these clouds, it is appropriate to describe them as marine stratocumulus cloud system (MSCS) in analogy with their deeper counterpart, the mesoscale convective system.

== History and climatology ==
Actinoform clouds were discovered in the 1960s soon after the launch of the TIROS V weather satellite. But until the late 1990s, scientists had dismissed them as merely a relatively uncommon transitional form between open- and closed-cell formations of stratocumulus clouds. The term "actinoform" was not included in the 2000 edition of the Glossary of Meteorology, which is considered to be the comprehensive reference work for meteorologists. However, these clouds are much more prevalent and complex than was originally thought.

Careful study of MISR images of the western coast of Peru revealed that actinoform-like clouds showed up roughly a quarter of the time as distinct formations within the more common, stratocumulus clouds in that region. Closer examination showed that actinoform clouds occur worldwide in nearly every region where marine stratus or stratocumulus clouds are common, particularly off the western coasts of continents—especially off Peru, Namibia, Western Australia, and Southern California. Such cloud systems are persistent year-round off the coast, yet in certain seasons they blow ashore and create the "June Gloom" effect on land. These cloud systems rarely form near the equator.

== Meteorological effects ==
The effect of actinoform clouds on weather systems and climate patterns is still being analyzed. Meteorology professor Bjorn Stevens of the University of California, Los Angeles theorizes that they, in conjunction with open-cell stratocumulus clouds, are associated with drizzle formation. Observations from field studies in both the northeastern and southeastern Pacific seem to indicate that when marine stratus and stratocumulus clouds exist alone, in the absence of these open cells, the cloud formations are associated with light, or no, drizzle.

When the open cells are present—and likewise actinoform clouds—there seems to be a corresponding increase in drizzle. Thus, data from recent field studies suggest that the presence of "pockets of open cells" (POCs) and actinoform clouds is related to the onset of precipitation. In fact, professor Stevens discovered that the shape of the cloud field reorganizes itself when the clouds begin to rain.

== Gallery ==
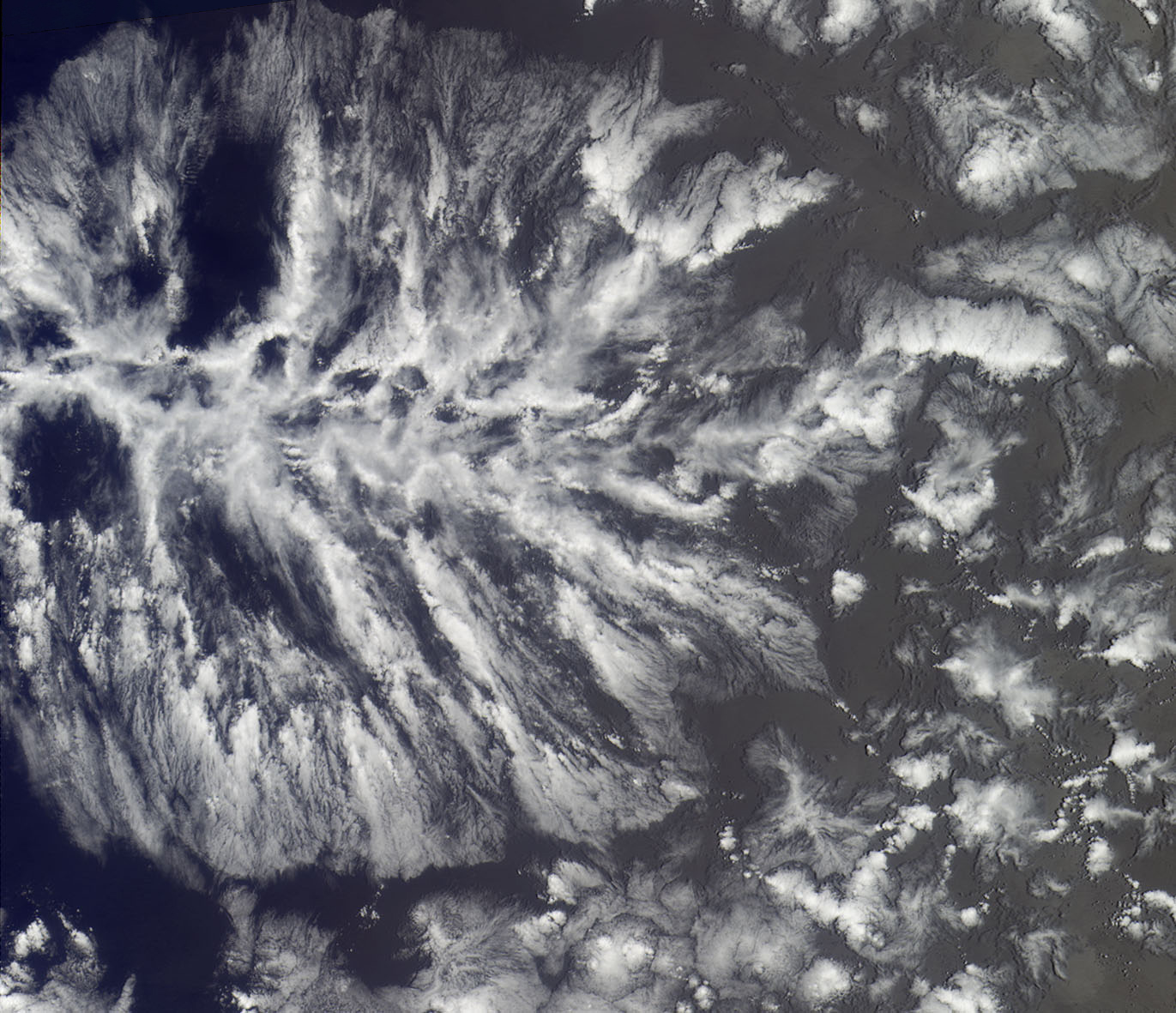
Actinoform cloud over the eastern Pacific Ocean.

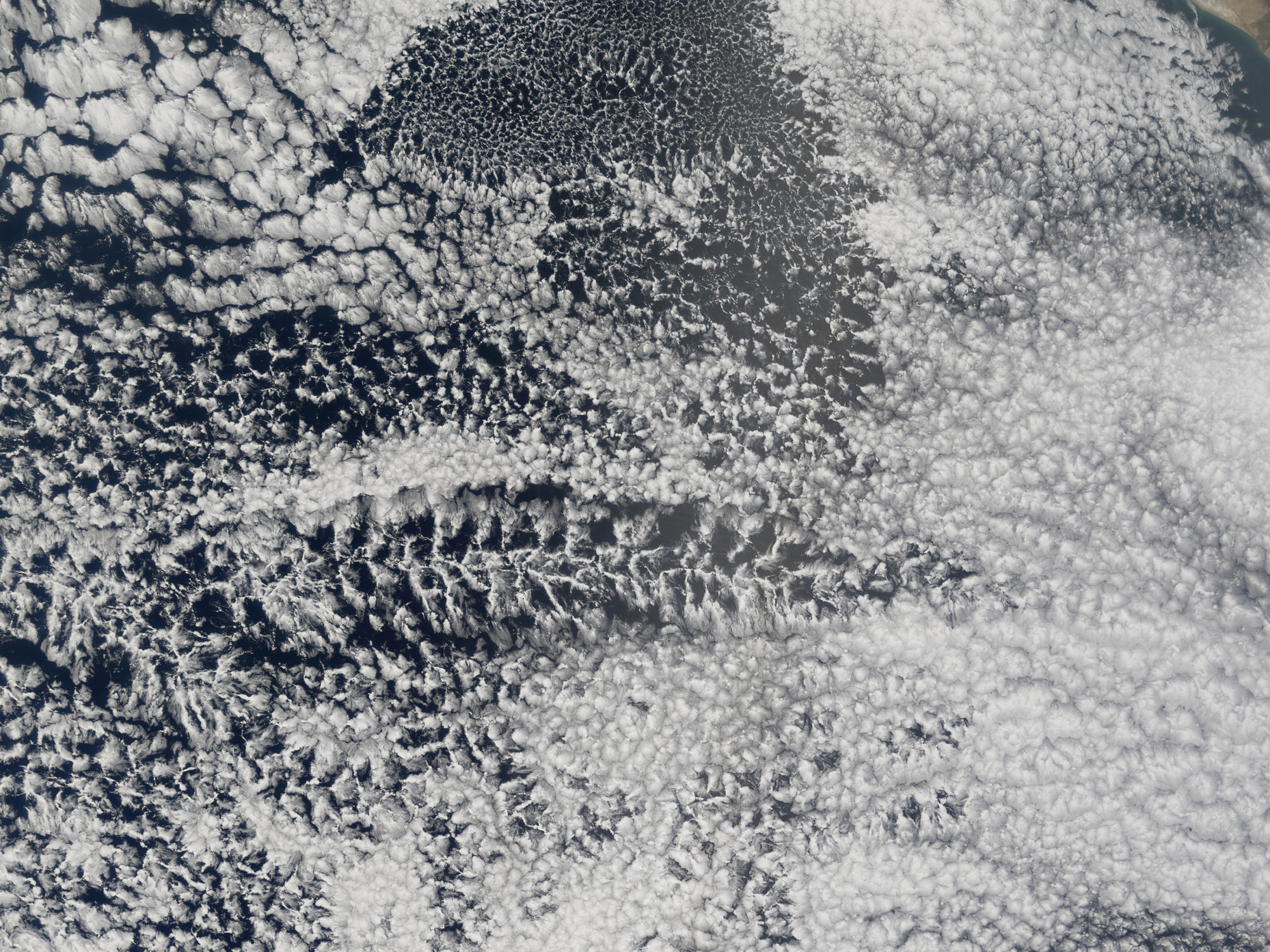
Here, an actinoform cloud can be seen in the center, while an open-cell formation of stratocumulus clouds is at the center top.

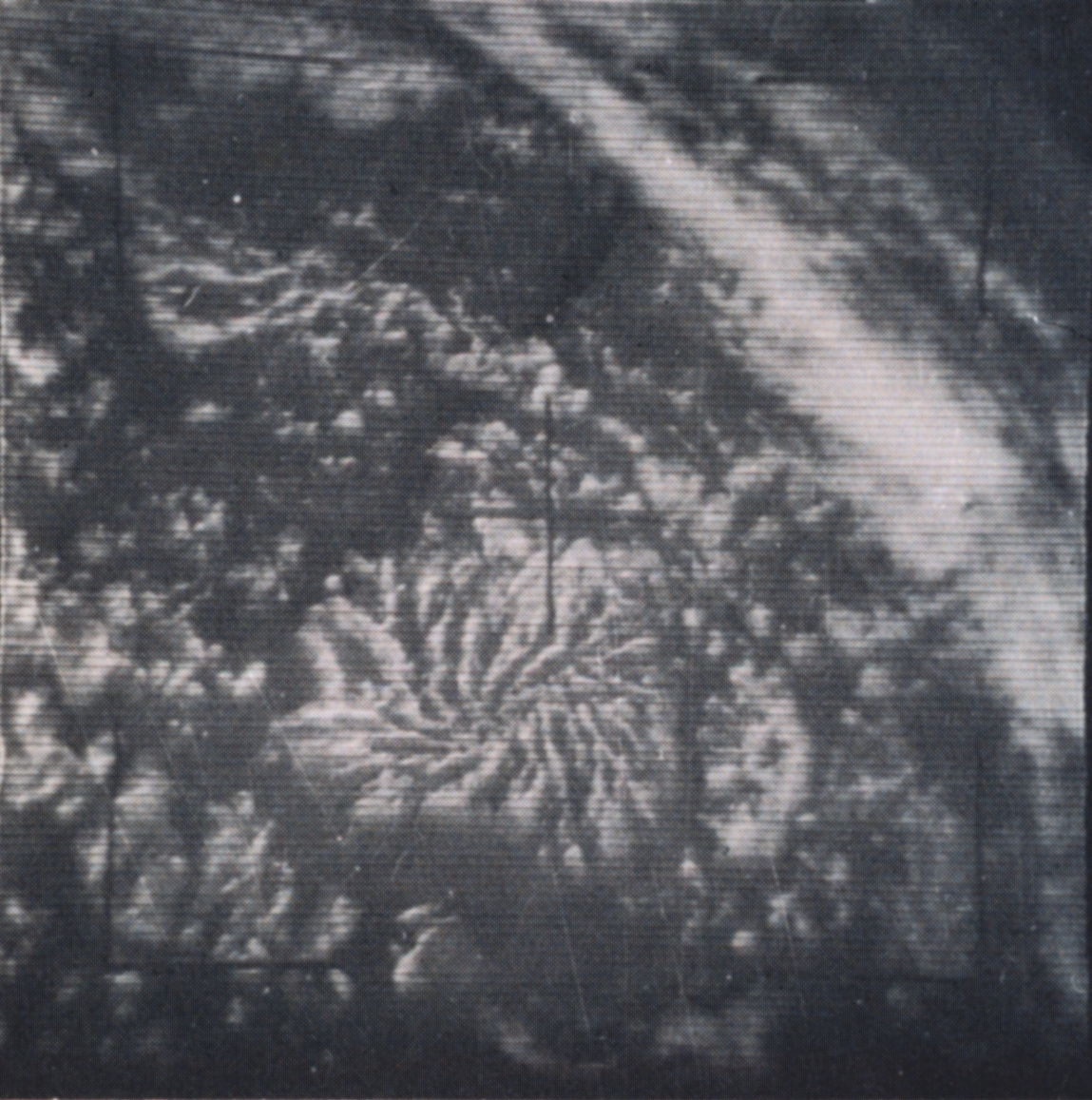
One of the earliest images of an actinoform cloud. Taken by TIROS 5 satellite in 1965.

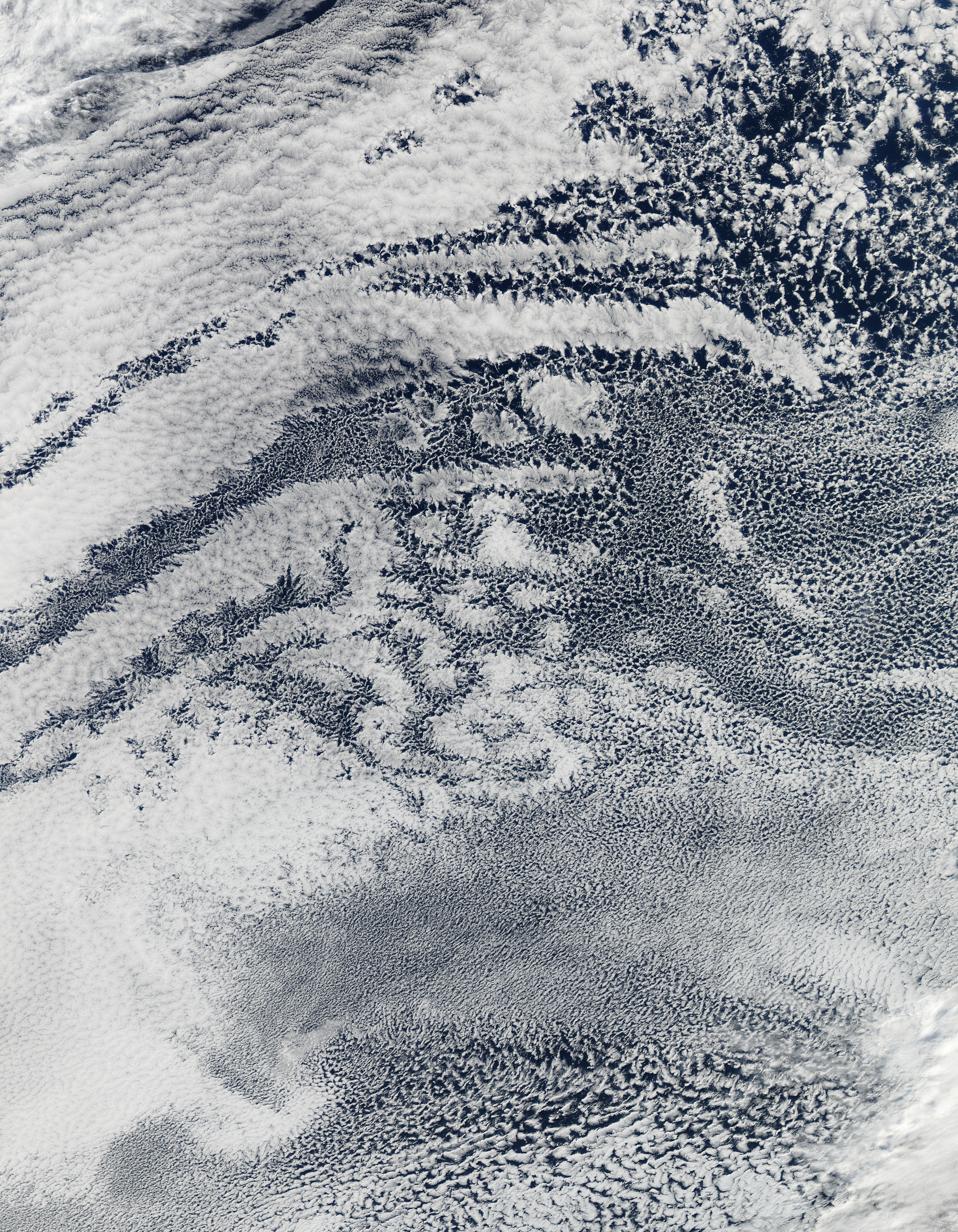
Open and closed-cell clouds over the Pacific Ocean.
