= Catalina eddy =

Coastal eddy that forms over the Southern California Bight

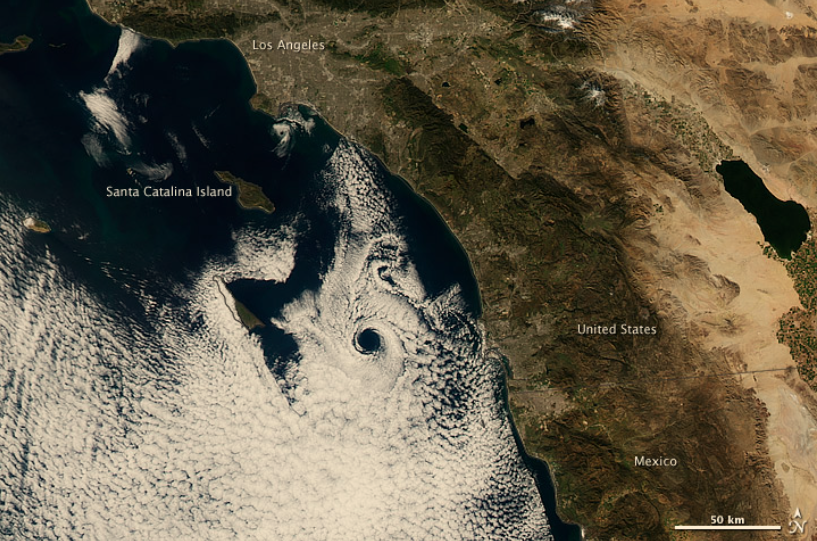

The Catalina eddy wind pattern, also called the "coastal eddy" or "marine layer," is a localized weather phenomenon that occurs in the Southern California Bight, the mostly concave portion of the Southern California coast running from Point Conception to San Diego. The Catalina eddy leads to June Gloom, which is so much a part of the late spring and early summer weather in Southern California. The eddy is named for Santa Catalina Island, one of the Channel Islands offshore between Los Angeles and San Diego.

Though the coastal marine layer can develop at any time of the year, predominantly these eddies occur between April and September with a peak in June. During these months, upper-level northwesterly flow along the California coast is directed onshore by the Channel Islands. When the flow is blocked by the mountains that ring the Los Angeles Basin to the east and north, a counterclockwise vortex is created. As temperatures drop after sunset, the marine layer deepens and coastal stratus clouds thicken. While the vortex is relatively small, rarely more than 100 miles (160 km) in diameter, it can extend into inland valleys and even into the southwestern Mojave Desert. A very strong Catalina eddy can be as deep as 6000 feet (1.8 km).

A Catalina eddy is rarely prolonged. As the heat over the deserts causes air to rise, the resulting pressure gradient and increase in the normal onshore winds causes the vortex to dissipate. The result is the common local weather forecast calling for "late night and early morning low clouds and fog, followed by afternoon sunshine and sea breezes."
