= Gloom =

Level of light so dim that there are physiological and psychological effects

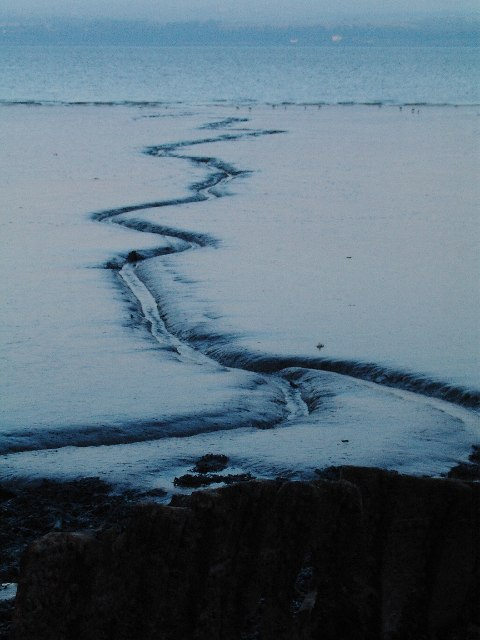
Gloomy mudflats at Bo'ness in Scotland

Gloom is a low level of light which is so dim that there are physiological and psychological effects. Human vision at this level becomes monochrome and has lessened clarity.

== Optical and psychological effects ==
Light conditions may be considered gloomy when the level of light in an environment is too low for the proper function of cone cells, and colour vision is lost. In a study by Rothwell and Campbell, light levels described as "gloomy" fell between 28 and 3.6 cd/m^{2}.

Low light and lack of color of this sort may be associated with depression and lethargy. This association was made as far back as the 2nd century by the ancient Greek physician, Aretaeus of Cappadocia, who said, "Lethargics are to be laid in the light and exposed to the rays of the sun, for the disease is gloom." Also, some studies have found weaker electrical activity in the retinas of depressed people, which gave the individuals studied poor visual contrast, meaning that they saw the world in grayer hues. The naturally weak daylight during winter at extreme latitudes can cause seasonal affective disorder (SAD), although a percentage of people experience SAD during summer. A solarium or other source of bright light may be used as light therapy to treat winter SAD.

== Architecture and ergonomics ==
Where artificial lighting is used, this has to be sufficient to not only illuminate the task area, but also provide sufficient background lighting to avoid a sensation of gloominess which has a negative effect on efficiency. If the task is challenging, such as playing cricket, reaction times are found to increase significantly when the illumination declines to the gloom level.

In architecture, the level of lighting affects whether a building is considered to be unappealing. If there is little or no sunlight or view of the outdoor surroundings from within, then this will tend to make the building seem "gloomy". As seen from the exterior, an interior which is brighter than the surrounding light level may cause the overall building to seem gloomy because the normal cues and contrasts have been upset.

== Artistic effect ==
In the arts, a gloomy landscape or setting may be used to illustrate themes such as melancholy or poverty. Horace Walpole coined the term gloomth to describe the ambiance of great ancient buildings which he recreated in the Gothic revival of his house, Strawberry Hill, and novel, The Castle of Otranto. Characters which exemplify a gloomy outlook include Eeyore, Marvin and Old Man Gloom. The catchphrase "doom and gloom", which is commonly used to express extreme pessimism, was popularised by the movie Finian's Rainbow in which the leprechaun Og (Tommy Steele) uses it repeatedly.

== Weather ==
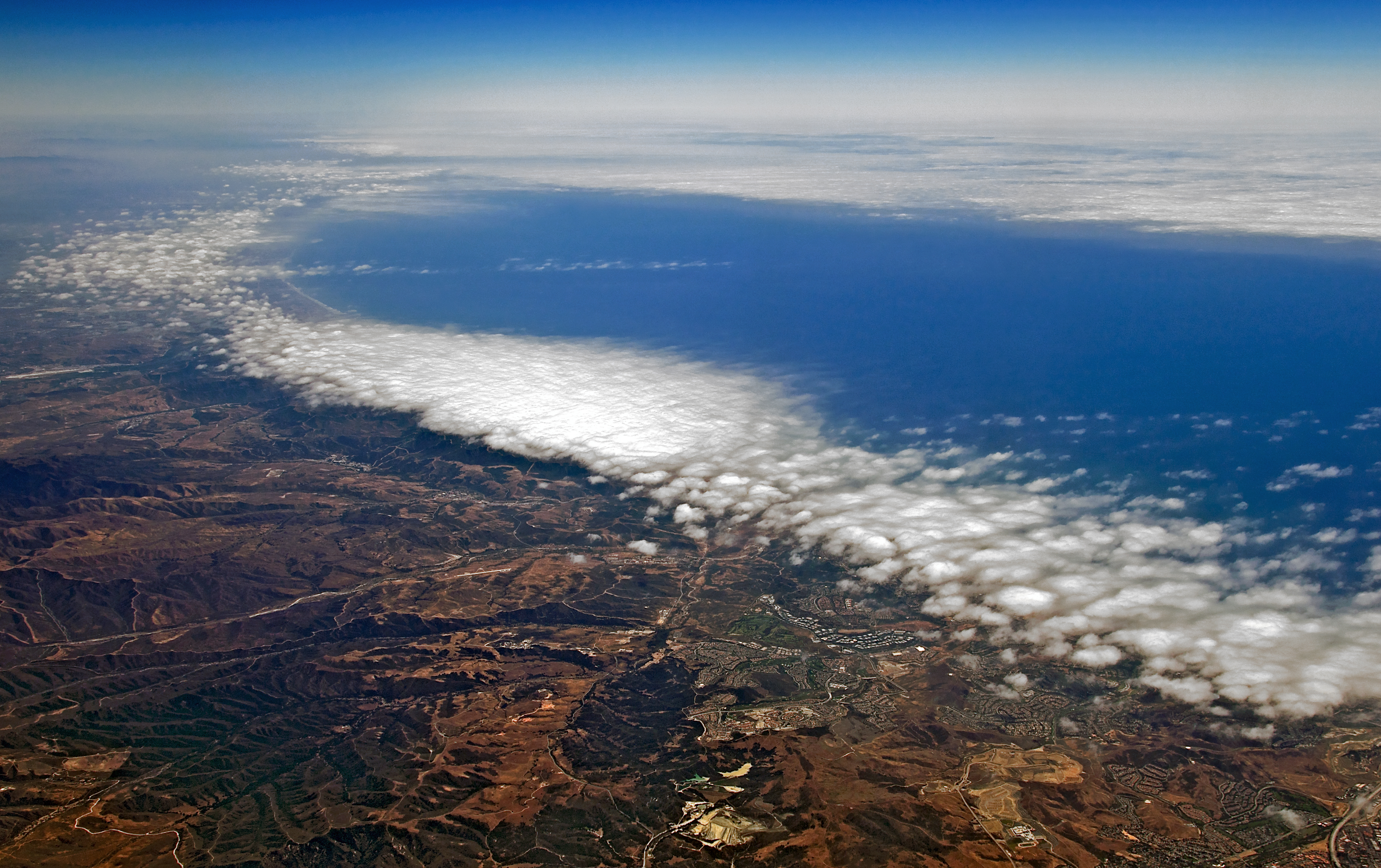
This coastal overcast causes the "June Gloom" in California, as seen from above the cloud layer.

Gloomy conditions may arise when low cloud cover forms a continuous overcast. This occurs annually in Southern California, where it is known as June Gloom. Anticyclones may generate gloom-like conditions if they remain stationary, causing a haze and layer of stratocumulus clouds. These tend to occur in temperate winter at the middle latitudes or over an extended period in subtropical regions.
