= Marine stratocumulus =

Type of low cloud common over subtropical oceans

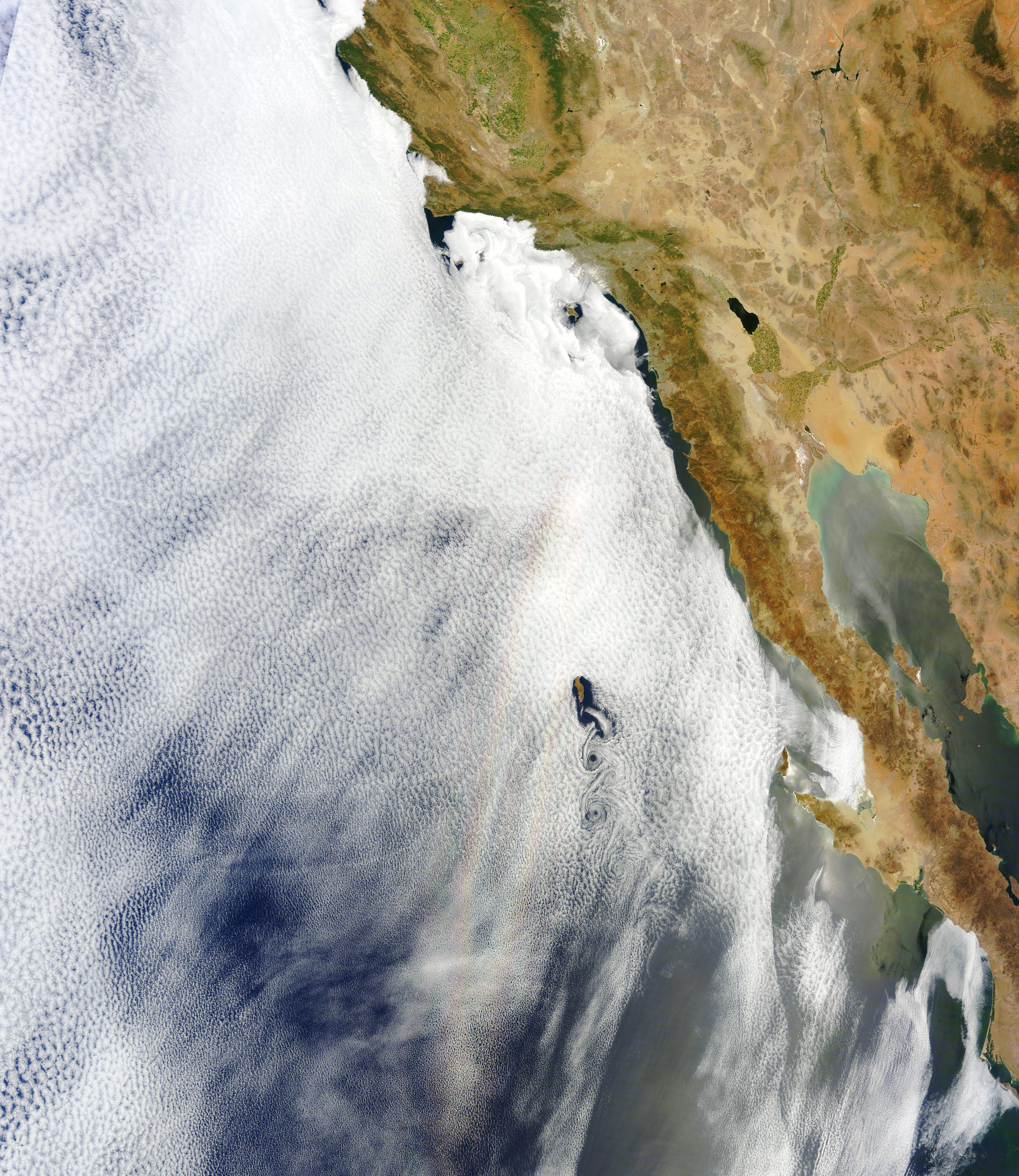
- Abbreviation: Sc
- Genus: Stratocumulus
- Classification: Family C (Low-level)
- Precipitation: Drizzle

Marine stratocumulus is a type of low stratocumulus cloud that forms over oceans, especially along the west coasts of continents where cool sea-surface temperatures and atmospheric subsidence produce a stable marine layer. Marine stratocumulus commonly forms extensive cloud decks over the eastern subtropical oceans and is among the most widespread cloud types on Earth.

Because these bright cloud decks strongly reflect incoming solar radiation, marine stratocumulus plays an important role in the Earth's radiation budget and climate system.

== Formation and boundary-layer structure ==
Marine stratocumulus typically develops where relatively warm, moist air overlies colder ocean water. Along many continental west coasts, prevailing winds and the Coriolis force drive surface waters away from the coastline, allowing colder water from below to rise through upwelling.

The cool ocean surface lowers the temperature of the air directly above it, often producing a strong temperature inversion at the top of the marine boundary layer. As the air cools to its dew point, water vapour condenses onto cloud condensation nuclei and forms cloud droplets.

Although the inversion suppresses deep convection, the cloud-topped marine boundary layer remains dynamically active. Radiative cooling near cloud tops destabilizes the upper portion of the marine boundary layer and drives shallow turbulent overturning within the cloud deck. This shallow convection continuously transports moisture and heat through the boundary layer while the inversion above limits vertical cloud growth.

Marine stratocumulus layers are often associated with weak drizzle, turbulent mixing, and entrainment of dry air from above the inversion. Variations in these processes influence cloud thickness, droplet size, cloud lifetime, and transitions between different cellular structures.

== Cellular organization ==
Marine stratocumulus cloud decks frequently organize into mesoscale cellular convection, producing open-cell and closed-cell patterns visible from aircraft and satellites.

In closed-cell convection, broad cloudy regions are associated with shallow convective updrafts surrounded by narrower regions of descending air. Open-cell convection instead forms ring-like cloud walls surrounding clearer interiors and is often associated with stronger drizzle and reduced cloud cover.

The transition between open-cell and closed-cell organization is influenced by precipitation, aerosol concentration, boundary-layer stability, and entrainment processes.

== Climate significance ==
Marine stratocumulus clouds are climatically important because their extensive bright cloud decks reflect large amounts of incoming solar radiation over otherwise dark ocean surfaces. Small changes in cloud coverage, cloud-top height, droplet concentration, or precipitation behaviour can significantly affect the Earth's albedo and planetary energy balance.

Marine stratocumulus is also important in studies of aerosol-cloud interaction and cloud feedbacks in climate models. The response of marine stratocumulus to climate warming remains an important source of uncertainty in projections of future climate change.

Because marine stratocumulus occupies vast oceanic regions, even relatively small changes in cloud persistence or reflectivity may substantially influence estimates of global climate sensitivity.

== Occurrence ==
Marine stratocumulus is especially common over the eastern Pacific Ocean off California and Peru, the southeastern Atlantic off Namibia and Angola, and the northeastern Atlantic near the Canary Current system. These regions are associated with cool sea-surface temperatures, persistent atmospheric subsidence, and strong marine inversions.

Seasonal strengthening of marine stratocumulus along the California coast contributes to phenomena such as June Gloom.

== See also ==
- June Gloom
- Marine layer
- Oceanic climate
- Stratocumulus cloud
