= June Gloom =

Weather phenomenon in coastal California

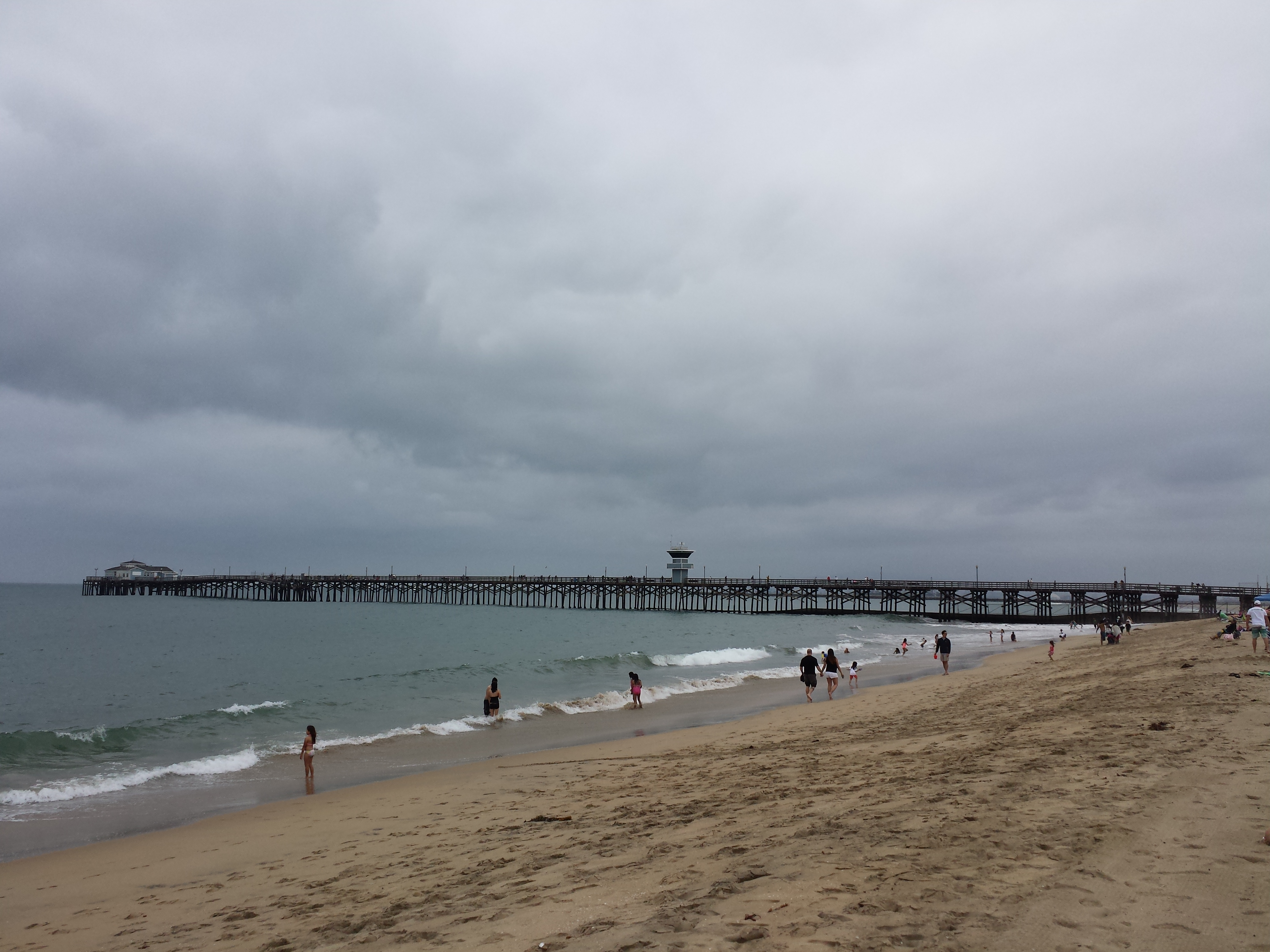
June Gloom conditions prevailing at Seal Beach in late morning, June 2013.

June Gloom is a mainly Southern California term for a weather pattern that results in cloudy, overcast skies with cool temperatures during the late spring and early summer. While the marine layer is most common in the month of June, it can occur in surrounding months, giving rise to other colloquialisms, such as Graypril, May Gray, Junuary, No-Sky July, and Fogust. Low-altitude stratus clouds form over the cool water of the California Current, and spread overnight into the coastal regions of California.

The overcast skies often are accompanied by fog and drizzle, though usually not rain. June Gloom usually clears up between mid-morning and early afternoon, depending on the strength of the marine layer and the distance of the location from the Pacific Ocean, and gives way to sunny skies. May and June together are usually the cloudiest months in coastal California. June Gloom is stronger in years associated with a La Niña, and weaker or nonexistent in years with an El Niño. This weather pattern is relatively rare, and occurs only in a few other parts of the world where climates and conditions are similar. Scientists study the cloud fields that make up June Gloom to increase understanding of cloud behavior at the onset of precipitation.

== Description ==
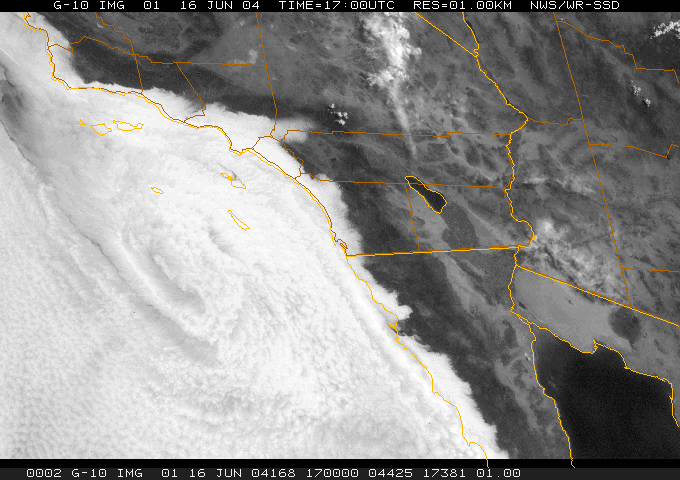
Satellite image of a strong June Gloom day, showing marine layer clouds covering the coastal regions of the counties of Santa Barbara, Ventura, Los Angeles, Orange, and San Diego. The San Fernando Valley and San Gabriel Valley also are covered, with clouds spilling inland as far eastward as San Bernardino. A Catalina eddy is visible near the center.

A typical June Gloom morning consists of marine stratus clouds covering the coast of southern California, extending a varying distance inland depending on the strength of the June Gloom effect that day. On a strong June Gloom day, the clouds and fog may cover the San Francisco Bay Area, penetrate far inland down valleys such as the Salinas Valley in central California, or extend into the Inland Empire of southern California. It's not uncommon for the layer to persist into the mid-afternoon or evening.

The clouds, which are formed by the marine layer, move in at night, usually after midnight, and typically dissipate in the late morning, giving way to clear, sunny skies. During a heavy June Gloom season, the condition may persist into the afternoon, or even all day during an exceptionally strong event. Often, the air is saturated with moisture, and fog also develops, along with frequent light mist and occasional drizzle. Fog and drizzle normally are found near the furthest inland extent of the gloom, where the cloud deck is closest to the ground.

By late morning to early afternoon, solar heating usually is sufficient to evaporate the clouds, and the sun emerges. The phenomenon forms earliest and lasts longest at the coast, with weaker effects as it moves further inland. When the marine layer is strong and deep, clouds can fill the Los Angeles Basin and spill over into the San Fernando Valley and San Gabriel Valley, even extending into the Santa Clarita Valley and Inland Empire on exceptionally strong June Gloom mornings. If conditions are not as strong, the Basin may be filled while the valleys may be clear. It is not uncommon for motorists to drive over the Sepulveda Pass from the clear, sunny San Fernando Valley and plunge into a cloudy, fog-filled Los Angeles. On a weak June Gloom morning, the clouds and fog may only be present within a mile or two of the coastline, affecting only the beach cities.

== Climate effects ==
A combination of atmospheric and oceanic conditions must be just right in order for June Gloom to form, and these conditions usually align only around May and June of each year. These include the marine layer effect common to the West Coast of the United States, an atmospheric inversion caused by subsidence of high-pressure air from the subtropical ridge, and sufficiently cool ocean water off the coast. The June Gloom pattern is also enhanced by the Catalina eddy local to southern California.

The months of May and June are typically the cloudiest months of the year in coastal southern California, having only 59% and 58% sunny days, respectively, on average in San Diego. The number of days in May and June that are "gloomy" varies from year to year. Anomalies in sea surface temperature can be used to forecast the length and intensity of the June Gloom phenomenon in a given season. Years with warmer ocean temperatures, referred to as El Niño, may result in fewer gray days in May and June. Cooler ocean temperatures, associated with La Niña, usually foretell a more gray period.

The climate charts below show a clear drop in the mean monthly sunshine hours and percent possible sunshine for the months of May and June, which are the two months when the June Gloom pattern is the strongest.

Climate data for Los Angeles (USC, Downtown), 1981–2010 normals, extremes 1877–present
| Month | Jan | Feb | Mar | Apr | May | Jun | Jul | Aug | Sep | Oct | Nov | Dec | Year |
|---|---|---|---|---|---|---|---|---|---|---|---|---|---|
| Mean daily maximum °F (°C) | 68.2 (20.1) | 68.6 (20.3) | 70.2 (21.2) | 72.7 (22.6) | 74.5 (23.6) | 78.1 (25.6) | 83.1 (28.4) | 84.4 (29.1) | 83.1 (28.4) | 78.5 (25.8) | 72.8 (22.7) | 67.7 (19.8) | 75.2 (24.0) |
| Mean daily minimum °F (°C) | 47.8 (8.8) | 49.3 (9.6) | 51.0 (10.6) | 53.5 (11.9) | 57.1 (13.9) | 60.3 (15.7) | 63.6 (17.6) | 64.1 (17.8) | 63.1 (17.3) | 58.7 (14.8) | 52.0 (11.1) | 47.5 (8.6) | 55.7 (13.2) |
| Average rainfall inches (mm) | 3.12 (79) | 3.80 (97) | 2.43 (62) | 0.91 (23) | 0.26 (6.6) | 0.09 (2.3) | 0.01 (0.25) | 0.04 (1.0) | 0.24 (6.1) | 0.66 (17) | 1.04 (26) | 2.33 (59) | 14.93 (379.25) |
| Mean monthly sunshine hours | 225.3 | 222.5 | 267.0 | 303.5 | 276.2 | 275.8 | 364.1 | 349.5 | 278.5 | 255.1 | 217.3 | 219.4 | 3,254.2 |
| Percentage possible sunshine | 71 | 72 | 72 | 78 | 64 | 64 | 83 | 84 | 75 | 73 | 70 | 71 | 73 |
Source: NOAA (sun 1961–1977)

Climate data for San Diego Int'l Airport (1981–2010 normals, (Note: Mean monthly maxima and minima (i.e. the highest and lowest temperature readings during an entire month or year) calculated based on data at said location from 1981 to 2010.) extremes 1874–present) (Note: Official precipitation records for San Diego were kept at the Weather Bureau Office in downtown from October 1850 to December 1859 at the Mission San Diego and from November 1871 to June 1939 and a variety of buildings at downtown, and at San Diego Int'l (Lindbergh Field) since July 1939. Temperature records, however, only date from October 1874. For more information on data coverage, see ThreadEx)
| Month | Jan | Feb | Mar | Apr | May | Jun | Jul | Aug | Sep | Oct | Nov | Dec | Year |
|---|---|---|---|---|---|---|---|---|---|---|---|---|---|
| Mean daily maximum °F (°C) | 65.1 (18.4) | 65.0 (18.3) | 65.6 (18.7) | 67.5 (19.7) | 68.5 (20.3) | 70.8 (21.6) | 74.6 (23.7) | 76.4 (24.7) | 75.9 (24.4) | 72.8 (22.7) | 69.0 (20.6) | 64.7 (18.2) | 69.7 (20.9) |
| Mean daily minimum °F (°C) | 49.0 (9.4) | 50.7 (10.4) | 53.2 (11.8) | 55.9 (13.3) | 59.4 (15.2) | 62.0 (16.7) | 65.4 (18.6) | 66.7 (19.3) | 65.2 (18.4) | 60.6 (15.9) | 53.6 (12.0) | 48.4 (9.1) | 57.5 (14.2) |
| Average rainfall inches (mm) | 1.98 (50) | 2.27 (58) | 1.81 (46) | 0.78 (20) | 0.12 (3.0) | 0.07 (1.8) | 0.03 (0.76) | 0.02 (0.51) | 0.15 (3.8) | 0.57 (14) | 1.01 (26) | 1.53 (39) | 10.34 (263) |
| Mean monthly sunshine hours | 239.3 | 227.4 | 261.0 | 276.2 | 250.5 | 242.4 | 304.7 | 295.0 | 253.3 | 243.4 | 230.1 | 231.3 | 3,054.6 |
| Percentage possible sunshine | 75 | 74 | 70 | 71 | 58 | 57 | 70 | 71 | 68 | 69 | 73 | 74 | 69 |
Source: NOAA (sun and relative humidity 1961–1990)

June Gloom has been reported by some Californians to bring on symptoms consistent with seasonal affective disorder, although this is not well-supported by evidence. However, the normally-very-sunny Los Angeles climate also is home to people who thrive during the brief seasonal respite the gloom provides from the unending sunshine and clear skies.

In the early 20th century, this phenomenon was sometimes known as the high fog. A long June Gloom season, extending late into the summer, is known as Summer Bummer. The negative effects of a long June Gloom on the coastal California tourism industry is often reported in the local news media. The phenomenon can be especially disorienting to visitors from inland areas who, coming from the summer heat, would not expect cool temperatures and clouds and fog at the beach.

== Formation ==
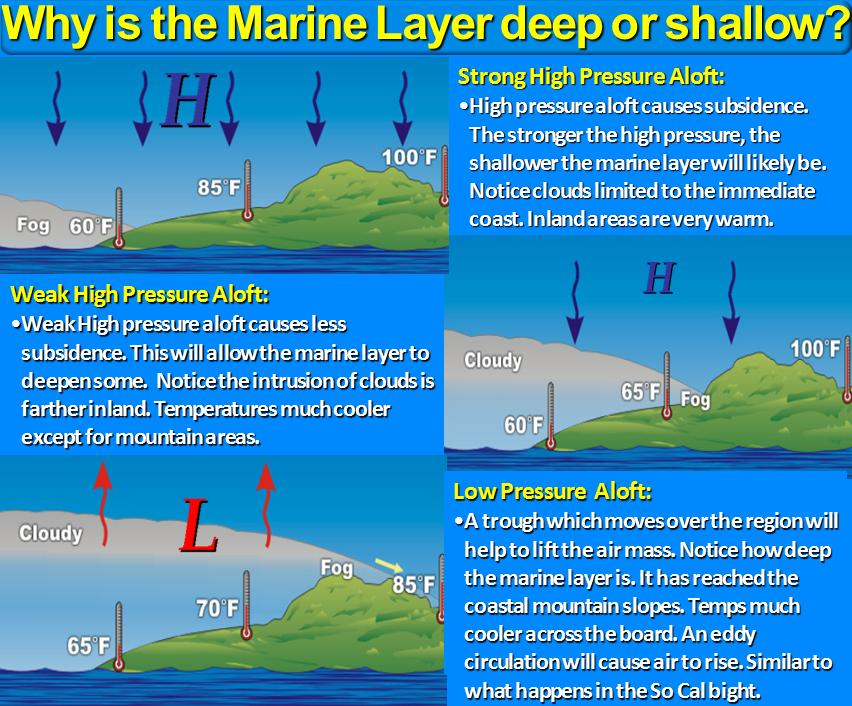

The low-altitude stratus clouds that make up the June Gloom cloud layer form over the nearby ocean, and are transported over the coastal areas by the region's prevailing westerly winds. The sheet-like stratus clouds are almost uniformly horizontal, covering large areas but having relatively shallow depth of 1,600 to 6,600 feet (500 to 2,000 m). These clouds begin to form when wind mixes moisture from the ocean surface into the air. The air cools and expands as it is mixed and moves upward, and this cooling increases the relative humidity. When the relative humidity reaches 100%, the water vapor condenses into liquid water droplets and the clouds begin to form. The stable top of the marine layer, a result of the temperature inversion, prevents any dry, warm air from above the inversion from mixing with the stratus deck. This confines the stratus deck to a relatively narrow vertical band in the atmosphere, allowing it to strengthen.

The inversion layer is crucial to the formation of the marine stratus that produce June Gloom. Compression and warming of air sinking out of the North Pacific High-pressure system (which is strongest during the summer) meets with the rising, cooling air from the sea surface, producing a very stable layer of air that caps the cool air from rising any further. The strength of this subsidence inversion affects the strength of the marine layer, and how long it will take the clouds to dissipate. Additionally, the cool ocean water of the California Current, which flows out of the cold Gulf of Alaska, enhances the contrast between the cool air below the inversion layer and the warm air above it. A stronger inversion layer – one with a greater difference in temperature between the air above and the air below – often results in more and deeper marine layer clouds that persist longer into the day. Upwelling of colder-than-normal ocean water, associated with a La Niña, can strengthen this effect even more.

Once this marine layer has formed, the prevailing westerly winds advect the clouds over the coastal lands. The extent of inland advection is limited by southern California's coastal mountain ranges. The winds will continue to push the cloud layer onshore until they encounter mountains at or above the altitude of the clouds themselves, with the mountains then preventing any further inland progress of the marine layer. The foothill regions of these mountains experience some of the thickest fog and drizzle, as they are essentially in the clouds at this point.

The marine layer clouds of a June Gloom day usually are at their maximum at dawn, when the surface air is at a minimum temperature and the temperature difference in the inversion layer is at its maximum. The air beneath the inversion base being at its coolest also makes it likely that it will be saturated with a relative humidity of 100%.

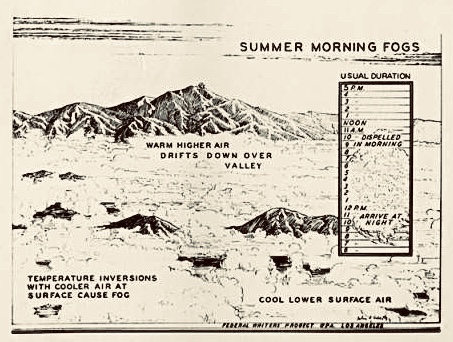
May Gray and June Gloom marine layer illustrated for the American Guide Series by the Federal Writers' Project, 1938

A sea breeze, which is caused by the temperature and pressure difference between warm areas inland and the cool air over the ocean, often develops on warm summer days as well, increasing the on-shore flow pattern and maintaining a constant flow of marine stratus clouds onto the coastal areas.

A strong low pressure system passing over southern California will produce the deepest and most extensive June Gloom marine layer. The marine layer effect is weakened when a weak high pressure system is in place over the region, and the marine layer will be very weak or nonexistent when there is a strong high-pressure system affecting southern California. The National Weather Service graphic on the right explains the effects of atmospheric conditions upon the marine layer and local weather conditions in more detail.

== Similar weather elsewhere in the world ==
While many parts of the world commonly have an offshore marine layer of stratus or stratocumulus clouds, other locations matching the daily and seasonal effects of Southern California's June Gloom are relatively rare. These include the western coast of Peru, the Macaronesian Islands, the western coasts of Morocco and Portugal, and Namibia in southern Africa.

== Actinoform clouds and drizzle prediction ==
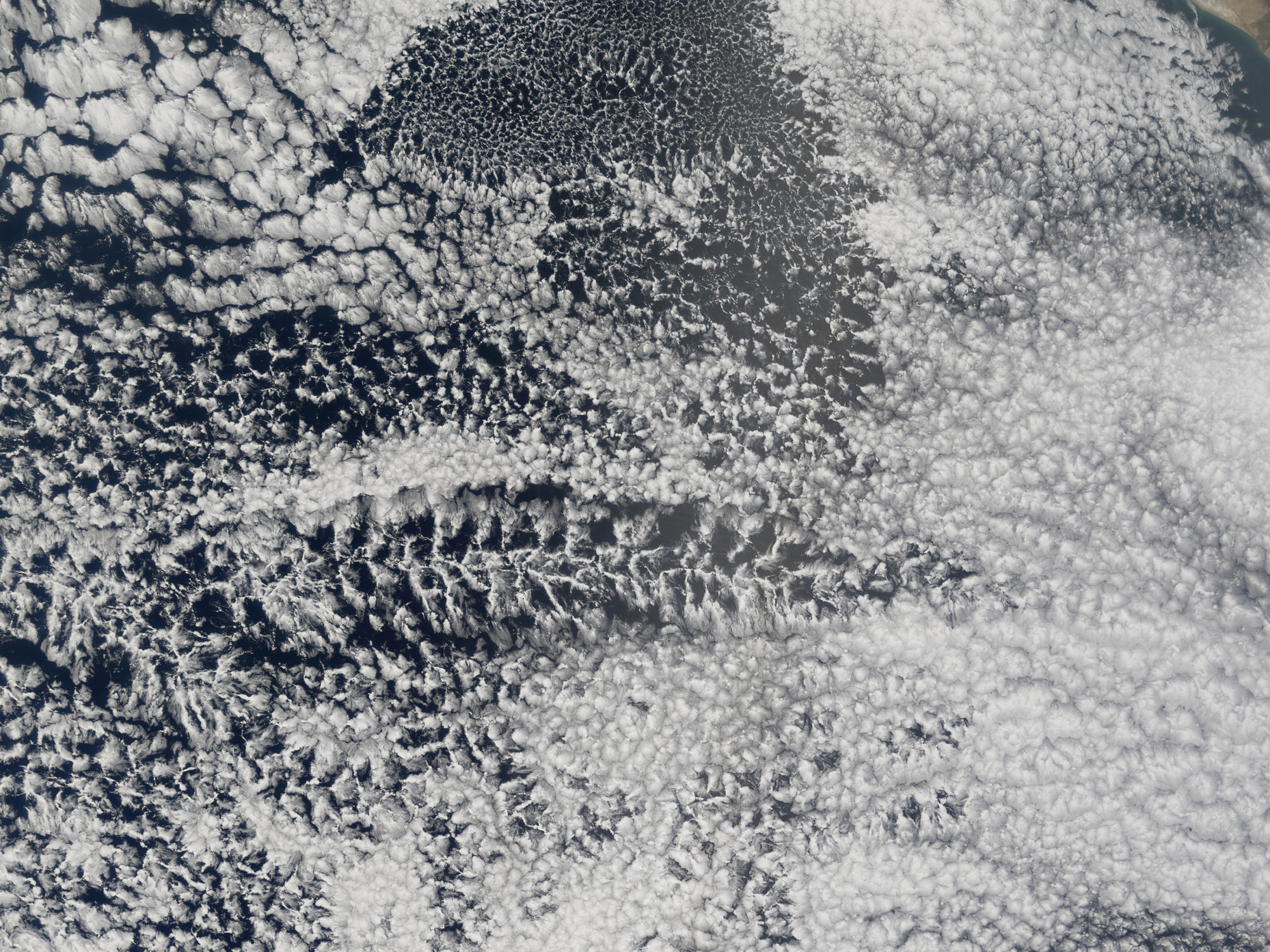
Actinoform clouds imaged by the MODIS instrument on board the Terra satellite.

Researchers have discovered that the cloud fields forming June Gloom and related phenomena from other west-coast marine-influenced climates are excellent places to find and study actinoform clouds. These clouds have been found to be present more often than expected in common stratocumulus layers. These clouds are persistent year-round off the coast, but are only drawn inland during June Gloom events and related phenomena elsewhere in the world. Observations suggest that when marine stratus is present alone, drizzle is minimized. However, scientists believe that the presence of actinoform clouds within the marine stratus is indicative of an increase in drizzle and the onset of precipitation. Observation and computer modeling have shown that the shape of the cloud fields actually rearrange themselves when the clouds start to rain.

== See also ==
- Gloom
- Climate of Los Angeles
- Climate of San Diego
- Inversion (meteorology)
- Marine stratocumulus
- San Francisco fog
- Tule fog
