= Overcast =

Meteorological condition

Storm clouds over the city of Yekaterinburg, Russia

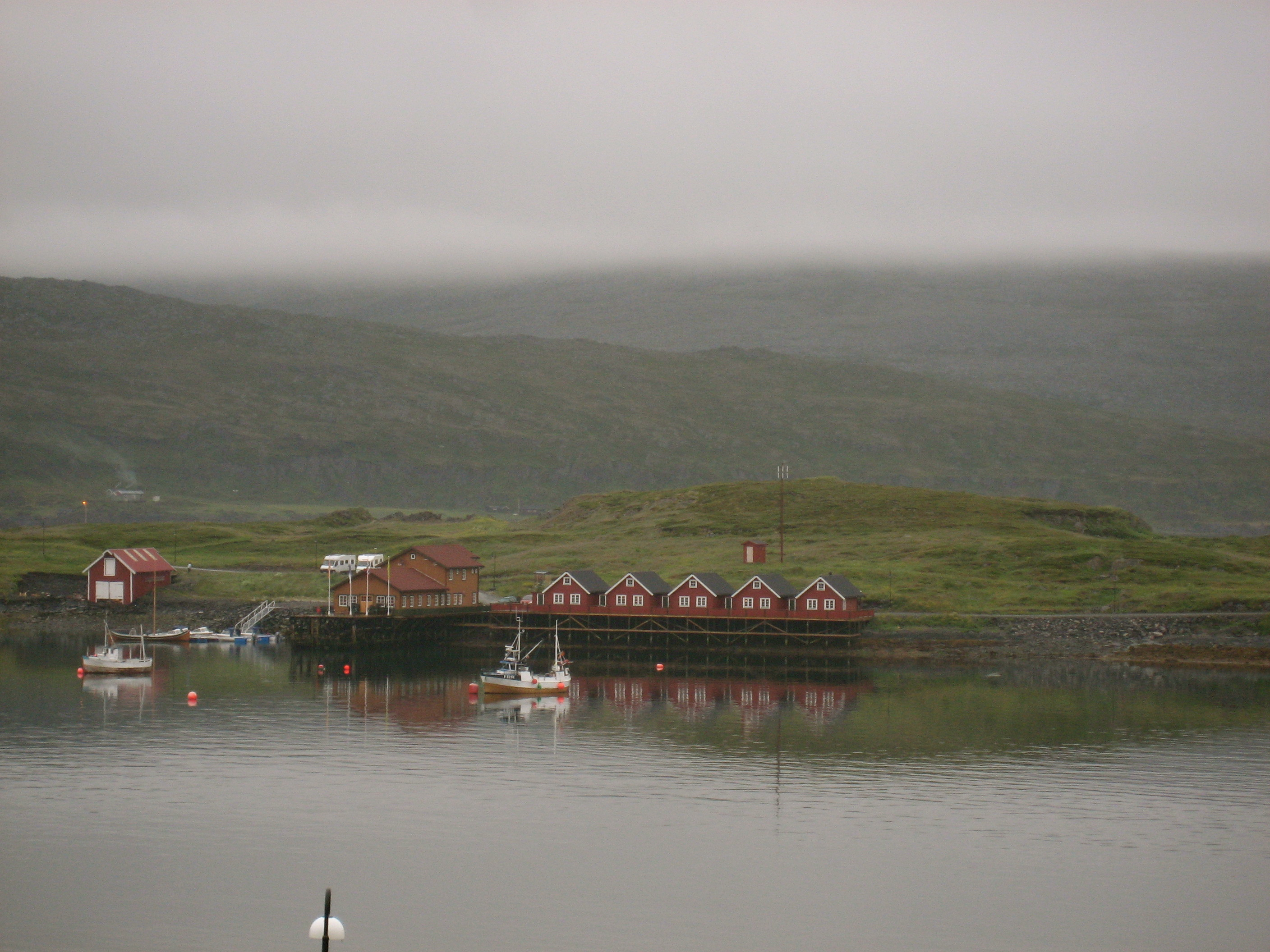
A completely overcast sky in Mehamn, Norway.

Overcast or overcast weather, as defined by the World Meteorological Organization, is the meteorological condition of clouds obscuring at least 95% of the sky. However, the total cloud cover must not be entirely due to obscuring phenomena near the surface, such as fog.

== Definition ==
Overcast, written as "OVC" in the METAR observation, is reported when the cloud cover is observed to equal eight oktas (eighths). An overcast sky may be explicitly identified as thin (mostly transparent), but otherwise considered opaque—which always constitutes a ceiling in aviation meteorology.

== Appearance ==
Sometimes clouds can be of different colors such as black or white, but overcast usually refers to darker skies. In some cases, it can be characterized by almost zero distinction of borders of clouds. Or the sky may be covered by a single type of cloud, such as stratus, turning the whole sky into a dull white color.

== Length ==
Periods of overcast weather can range from a few hours to several days. Overcast weather can also affect people suffering from seasonal affective disorder.

The same weather when observed from above may be referred to as undercast, generally by pilots reporting in-flight weather conditions.

== See also ==
- Diffuse reflection
  - Forward scatter
  - Light scattering by particles
- Diffuser (optics)
- Gloom
  - June Gloom
- Hard and soft light
- Photon diffusion
