= Climate of Los Angeles =

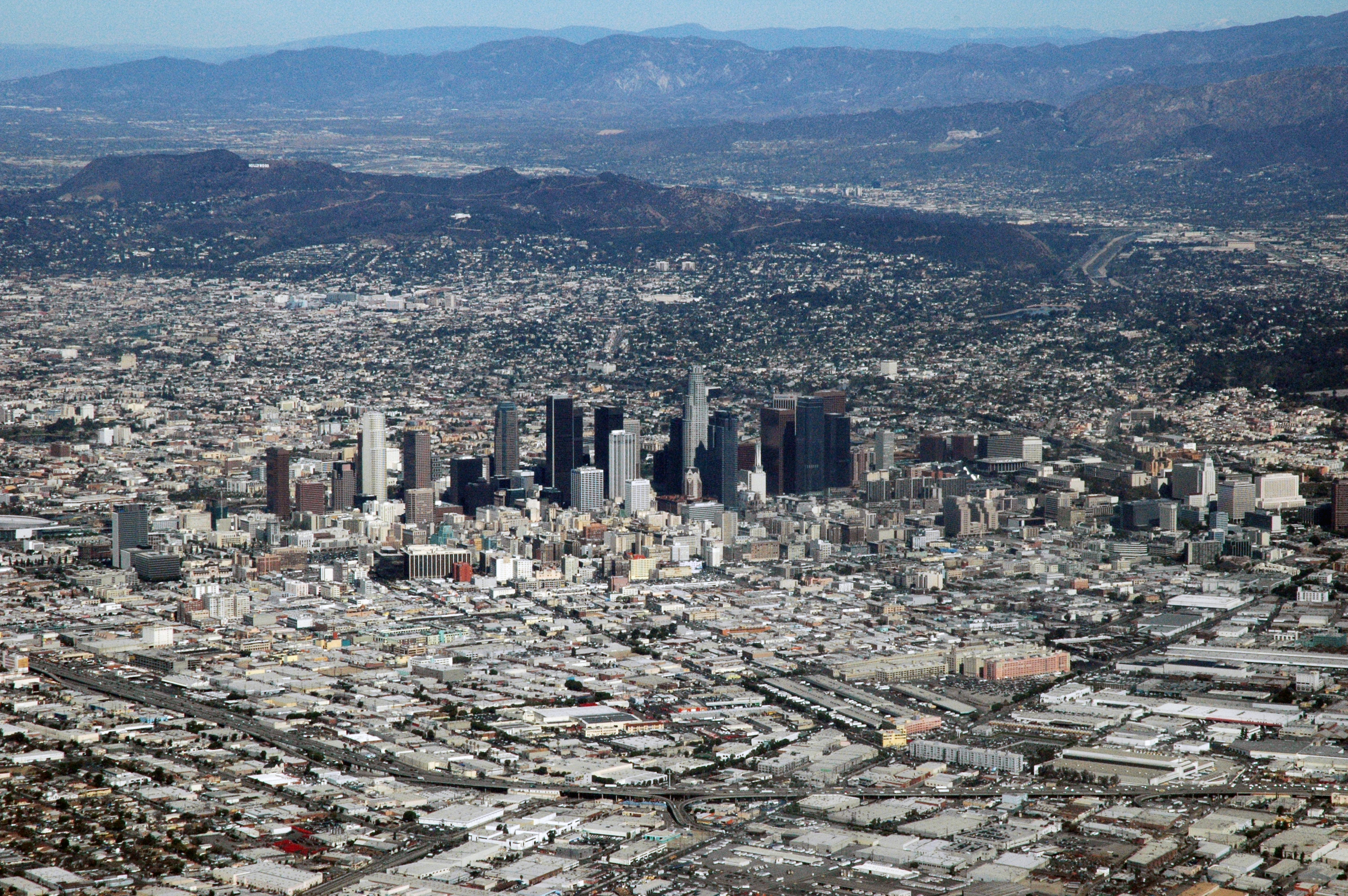
Downtown Los Angeles on a typically sunny day, but with unusual atmospheric clarity.

The climate of Los Angeles is mild to hot year-round, and mostly dry. It is classified as borderline Mediterranean and semi-arid. The city is characterized by seasonal changes in rainfall—with a cool, wet winter and warm dry summer season. Under the Köppen climate classification, the coastal areas are classified as BSk and Csb, while the inland areas are classified as BSh and Csa.

The Los Angeles area contains microclimates, where daytime temperatures can vary as much as 36 °F (20 °C) between inland areas such as the San Fernando Valley or San Gabriel Valley, and the coastal Los Angeles Basin. The two northernmost cities in Los Angeles County, Palmdale and Lancaster, rarely (although more often than the other cities in the county) receive snow in the winter due to their altitude of approximately 2,500 feet (760 m), while their summers are hotter than the rest of the county.

== Classifications ==
Los Angeles Climate according to major climate systems
Climatic scheme	Initials	Description
Köppen system	Csa, Csb, BSh, BSk	Hot-summer Mediterranean climate Warm-summer Mediterranean climate Hot semi-arid climate Cold semi-arid climate
Trewartha system	Cs	Subtropical dry summer climate
Alisov system	—N/a	Subtropical climate
Strahler system	—N/a	Mediterranean climate
Thornthwaite system	D B'3	Semiarid and warm-mesothermal
Neef system	—N/a	West side/Winter rainy climate

== Temperatures and seasons ==
The primary weather station for Los Angeles is located near downtown at the south side of Dodger Stadium campus, and this article refers primarily to climate data generated by this station as representative of the Los Angeles metropolitan area as a whole.

The dry summer season normally runs from May through October, when clear skies, hot temperatures, and very little change in sensible weather occur from day to day. Average high temperatures are in the lower 80's F (26-28 C) with overnight lows in the lower 60's F (15-17 C). During this season, there is essentially no rainfall, and both July and August average less than 0.05 of an inch (1.27 mm) of monthly precipitation.

The wet winter season normally runs from November through April. Precipitation episodes in Los Angeles, with a few notable exceptions, are largely caused by extratropical disturbances approaching California from the west or northwest during the winter season. Of the total annual precipitation recorded in Los Angeles, 92% falls between November 1 and April 30. Despite the increased rain, the winter months are still frequently sunny and pleasant, however, with mild-to-warm temperatures. The average highs range from the upper 60's F to lower 70's F (17-21 C) with cooler overnight lows in the upper 40's and lower 50's F (8-12 C).

Climate data for Los Angeles (Dodger Stadium, Downtown), 1991–2020 normals, extremes 1877–present
Month	Jan	Feb	Mar	Apr	May	Jun	Jul	Aug	Sep	Oct	Nov	Dec	Year
Record high °F (°C)	95 (35)	95 (35)	99 (37)	106 (41)	103 (39)	112 (44)	109 (43)	106 (41)	113 (45)	108 (42)	100 (38)	92 (33)	113 (45)
Mean maximum °F (°C)	83.0 (28.3)	82.8 (28.2)	85.8 (29.9)	90.1 (32.3)	88.9 (31.6)	89.1 (31.7)	93.5 (34.2)	95.2 (35.1)	99.4 (37.4)	95.7 (35.4)	88.9 (31.6)	81.0 (27.2)	101.5 (38.6)
Mean daily maximum °F (°C)	68.0 (20.0)	68.0 (20.0)	69.9 (21.1)	72.4 (22.4)	73.7 (23.2)	77.2 (25.1)	82.0 (27.8)	84.0 (28.9)	83.0 (28.3)	78.6 (25.9)	72.9 (22.7)	67.4 (19.7)	74.8 (23.8)
Daily mean °F (°C)	58.4 (14.7)	59.0 (15.0)	61.1 (16.2)	63.6 (17.6)	65.9 (18.8)	69.3 (20.7)	73.3 (22.9)	74.7 (23.7)	73.6 (23.1)	69.3 (20.7)	63.0 (17.2)	57.8 (14.3)	65.8 (18.8)
Mean daily minimum °F (°C)	48.9 (9.4)	50.0 (10.0)	52.4 (11.3)	54.8 (12.7)	58.1 (14.5)	61.4 (16.3)	64.7 (18.2)	65.4 (18.6)	64.2 (17.9)	59.9 (15.5)	53.1 (11.7)	48.2 (9.0)	56.8 (13.8)
Mean minimum °F (°C)	41.4 (5.2)	42.9 (6.1)	45.4 (7.4)	48.9 (9.4)	53.5 (11.9)	57.4 (14.1)	61.1 (16.2)	61.7 (16.5)	59.1 (15.1)	53.7 (12.1)	45.4 (7.4)	40.5 (4.7)	39.2 (4.0)
Record low °F (°C)	28 (−2)	28 (−2)	31 (−1)	36 (2)	40 (4)	46 (8)	49 (9)	49 (9)	44 (7)	40 (4)	34 (1)	30 (−1)	28 (−2)
Average precipitation inches (mm)	3.29 (84)	3.64 (92)	2.23 (57)	0.69 (18)	0.32 (8.1)	0.09 (2.3)	0.02 (0.51)	0.00 (0.00)	0.13 (3.3)	0.58 (15)	0.78 (20)	2.48 (63)	14.25 (362)
Average precipitation days (≥ 0.01 in)	6.1	6.3	5.1	2.8	1.9	0.5	0.4	0.1	0.4	2.2	2.8	5.5	34.1
Mean monthly sunshine hours	225.3	222.5	267.0	303.5	276.2	275.8	364.1	349.5	278.5	255.1	217.3	219.4	3,254.2
Percentage possible sunshine	71	72	72	78	64	64	83	84	75	73	70	71	73
Average ultraviolet index	2.9	4.2	6.2	8.1	9.2	10.4	10.8	10.0	8.1	5.4	3.5	2.6	6.7
Source 1: NOAA (sun 1961–1977)
Source 2: UV Index Today (1995 to 2022)

Climate data for Los Angeles (LAX), 1991–2020 normals, extremes 1944–present
Month	Jan	Feb	Mar	Apr	May	Jun	Jul	Aug	Sep	Oct	Nov	Dec	Year
Record high °F (°C)	91 (33)	92 (33)	95 (35)	102 (39)	97 (36)	104 (40)	97 (36)	98 (37)	110 (43)	106 (41)	101 (38)	94 (34)	110 (43)
Mean maximum °F (°C)	81.2 (27.3)	80.1 (26.7)	80.6 (27.0)	83.1 (28.4)	80.6 (27.0)	79.8 (26.6)	83.7 (28.7)	86.0 (30.0)	90.7 (32.6)	90.9 (32.7)	87.2 (30.7)	78.8 (26.0)	95.5 (35.3)
Mean daily maximum °F (°C)	66.3 (19.1)	65.6 (18.7)	66.1 (18.9)	68.1 (20.1)	69.5 (20.8)	72.0 (22.2)	75.1 (23.9)	76.7 (24.8)	76.5 (24.7)	74.4 (23.6)	70.9 (21.6)	66.1 (18.9)	70.6 (21.4)
Daily mean °F (°C)	57.9 (14.4)	57.9 (14.4)	59.1 (15.1)	61.1 (16.2)	63.6 (17.6)	66.4 (19.1)	69.6 (20.9)	70.7 (21.5)	70.1 (21.2)	67.1 (19.5)	62.3 (16.8)	57.6 (14.2)	63.6 (17.6)
Mean daily minimum °F (°C)	49.4 (9.7)	50.1 (10.1)	52.2 (11.2)	54.2 (12.3)	57.6 (14.2)	60.9 (16.1)	64.0 (17.8)	64.8 (18.2)	63.7 (17.6)	59.8 (15.4)	53.7 (12.1)	49.1 (9.5)	56.6 (13.7)
Mean minimum °F (°C)	41.8 (5.4)	42.9 (6.1)	45.3 (7.4)	48.0 (8.9)	52.7 (11.5)	56.7 (13.7)	60.2 (15.7)	61.0 (16.1)	58.7 (14.8)	53.2 (11.8)	46.1 (7.8)	41.1 (5.1)	39.4 (4.1)
Record low °F (°C)	27 (−3)	34 (1)	35 (2)	42 (6)	45 (7)	48 (9)	52 (11)	51 (11)	47 (8)	43 (6)	38 (3)	32 (0)	27 (−3)
Average precipitation inches (mm)	2.86 (73)	2.99 (76)	1.73 (44)	0.60 (15)	0.28 (7.1)	0.08 (2.0)	0.04 (1.0)	0.00 (0.00)	0.11 (2.8)	0.49 (12)	0.82 (21)	2.23 (57)	12.23 (311)
Average precipitation days (≥ 0.01 in)	6.1	6.3	5.6	2.6	1.7	0.5	0.5	0.1	0.5	2.0	3.2	5.4	34.5
Average relative humidity (%)	63.4	67.9	70.5	71.0	74.0	75.9	76.6	76.6	74.2	70.5	65.5	62.9	70.8
Average dew point °F (°C)	41.4 (5.2)	44.4 (6.9)	46.6 (8.1)	49.1 (9.5)	52.7 (11.5)	56.5 (13.6)	60.1 (15.6)	61.2 (16.2)	59.2 (15.1)	54.1 (12.3)	46.8 (8.2)	41.4 (5.2)	51.1 (10.6)
Mean monthly sunshine hours	201.3	205.2	273.5	294.9	343.6	345.0	362.4	337.8	290.9	259.0	219.1	190.6	3,323.3
Source 1: NOAA (relative humidity and dew point 1961–1990)
Source 2: Weather.Directory

Climate data for Los Angeles (UCLA, 1991–2020 normals, extremes 1933–present)
Month	Jan	Feb	Mar	Apr	May	Jun	Jul	Aug	Sep	Oct	Nov	Dec	Year
Record high °F (°C)	91 (33)	91 (33)	94 (34)	103 (39)	97 (36)	102 (39)	106 (41)	99 (37)	109 (43)	103 (39)	99 (37)	94 (34)	109 (43)
Mean maximum °F (°C)	82.4 (28.0)	81.9 (27.7)	83.3 (28.5)	86.0 (30.0)	84.1 (28.9)	84.0 (28.9)	87.9 (31.1)	89.8 (32.1)	94.9 (34.9)	92.6 (33.7)	87.8 (31.0)	80.3 (26.8)	97.4 (36.3)
Mean daily maximum °F (°C)	67.7 (19.8)	67.0 (19.4)	68.0 (20.0)	69.6 (20.9)	70.2 (21.2)	72.9 (22.7)	76.9 (24.9)	78.8 (26.0)	78.7 (25.9)	76.2 (24.6)	72.1 (22.3)	67.1 (19.5)	72.1 (22.3)
Daily mean °F (°C)	59.8 (15.4)	59.1 (15.1)	60.0 (15.6)	61.8 (16.6)	63.2 (17.3)	66.0 (18.9)	69.6 (20.9)	71.0 (21.7)	70.6 (21.4)	67.9 (19.9)	63.7 (17.6)	59.3 (15.2)	64.3 (17.9)
Mean daily minimum °F (°C)	51.9 (11.1)	51.1 (10.6)	52.1 (11.2)	53.6 (12.0)	56.3 (13.5)	59.1 (15.1)	62.4 (16.9)	63.1 (17.3)	62.5 (16.9)	59.6 (15.3)	55.4 (13.0)	51.4 (10.8)	56.5 (13.6)
Mean minimum °F (°C)	42.9 (6.1)	43.0 (6.1)	44.4 (6.9)	46.6 (8.1)	50.8 (10.4)	54.2 (12.3)	57.7 (14.3)	58.3 (14.6)	56.6 (13.7)	53.0 (11.7)	47.3 (8.5)	43.4 (6.3)	40.8 (4.9)
Record low °F (°C)	30 (−1)	33 (1)	34 (1)	37 (3)	43 (6)	44 (7)	51 (11)	50 (10)	47 (8)	40 (4)	33 (1)	25 (−4)	25 (−4)
Average precipitation inches (mm)	4.14 (105)	4.73 (120)	2.73 (69)	0.77 (20)	0.42 (11)	0.11 (2.8)	0.03 (0.76)	0.01 (0.25)	0.15 (3.8)	0.72 (18)	0.99 (25)	2.93 (74)	17.73 (450)
Average snowfall inches (cm)	0.0 (0.0)	0.0 (0.0)	0.0 (0.0)	0.0 (0.0)	0.0 (0.0)	0.0 (0.0)	0.0 (0.0)	0.0 (0.0)	0.0 (0.0)	0.0 (0.0)	0.0 (0.0)	0.0 (0.0)	0.0 (0.0)
Average precipitation days (≥ 0.01 in)	6.3	6.5	5.1	2.5	1.7	0.9	0.6	0.2	0.5	2.3	3.1	5.3	35.0
Average snowy days (≥ 0.1 in)	0.0	0.0	0.0	0.0	0.0	0.0	0.0	0.0	0.0	0.0	0.0	0.0	0.0
Source 1: NOAA
Source 2: XMACIS2 (mean maxima/minima 1991–2020)

See or edit raw graph data.

Hottest and coldest, wettest and driest averages for a month (°F/inch and °C/mm), 1895–2019
Month	Jan	Feb	Mar	Apr	May	Jun	Jul	Aug	Sep	Oct	Nov	Dec
Hottest	63.9 °F (17.7 °C)	64.2 °F (17.9 °C)	67.5 °F (19.7 °C)	68.2 °F (20.1 °C)	71.5 °F (21.9 °C)	75.9 °F (24.4 °C)	79.8 °F (26.6 °C)	79.0 °F (26.1 °C)	80.3 °F (26.8 °C)	75.4 °F (24.1 °C)	66.9 °F (19.4 °C)	62.2 °F (16.8 °C)
Coldest	46.7 °F (8.2 °C)	51.1 °F (10.6 °C)	52.0 °F (11.1 °C)	55.2 °F (12.9 °C)	57.2 °F (14.0 °C)	62.9 °F (17.2 °C)	66.2 °F (19.0 °C)	66.3 °F (19.1 °C)	63.1 °F (17.3 °C)	57.8 °F (14.3 °C)	55.2 °F (12.9 °C)	49.4 °F (9.7 °C)
Wettest	14.43 inches (367 mm)	15.23 inches (387 mm)	10.44 inches (265 mm)	7.31 inches (186 mm)	3.83 inches (97 mm)	0.98 inches (25 mm)	0.43 inches (11 mm)	2.54 inches (65 mm)	5.13 inches (130 mm)	5.13 inches (130 mm)	9.96 inches (253 mm)	11.46 inches (291 mm)
Driest	0 inches (0 mm)	0 inches (0 mm)	0 inches (0 mm)	0 inches (0 mm)	0 inches (0 mm)	0 inches (0 mm)	0 inches (0 mm)	0 inches (0 mm)	0 inches (0 mm)	0 inches (0 mm)	0 inches (0 mm)	0 inches (0 mm)

=== Summer ===
Summer monsoon thunderstorms moving westward across Greater Los Angeles, bringing heavy rain, strong winds, and intense lightning.

Summers are warm to hot, and nearly completely dry. The summer temperature pattern usually begins in late June or early July, and lasts through September or October, although it may start as early as late May. In August, the average high/low at the University of Southern California downtown campus are 84.8 °F (29.3 °C) and 65.6 °F (18.7 °C). The same figures at Los Angeles International Airport, approximately 12 miles (19 km) to the southwest and near the ocean, are 76.6 °F (24.8 °C) and 64.2 °F (17.9 °C). However, temperatures across the region often exceed 90 °F (32 °C) during the summer. This happens when an atmospheric high-pressure area becomes dominant over the Great Basin of Nevada and Utah (a frequent occurrence), and the resulting offshore flow of the atmospheric air mass pauses the normal coastal sea breeze in Los Angeles. July, August and September are the hottest months, with September 27, 2010, holding the all-time record of 113 °F (45 °C). Skies are nearly constantly sunny, unless interrupted in late spring and early summer by the June Gloom pattern, which is unpredictable year to year.

While very uncommon on the coastal strip, the North American Monsoon can bring occasional thunderstorms and high humidity to Greater Los Angeles in the summer and early fall.

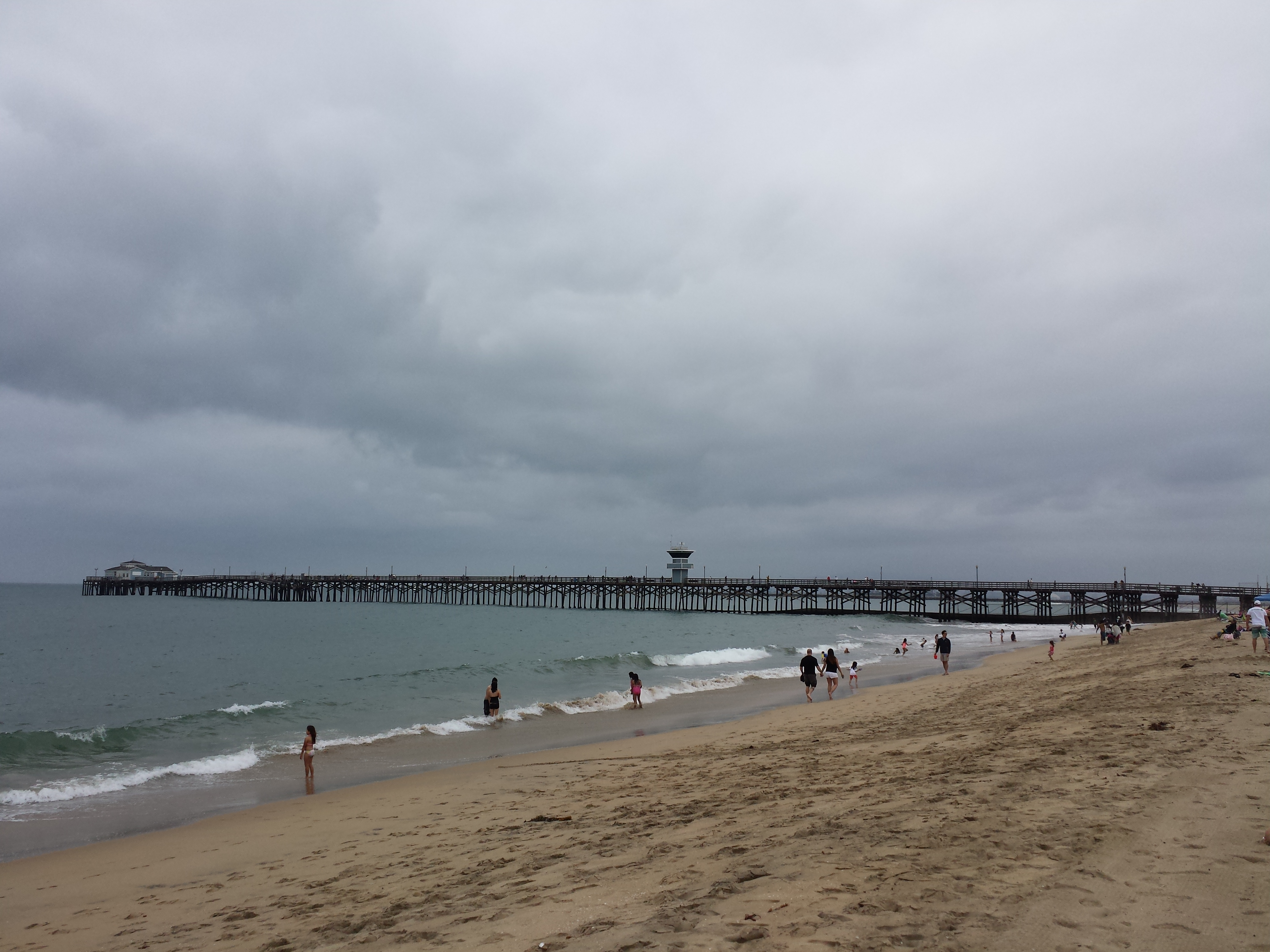
Typical June Gloom conditions in late morning at Seal Beach, June 2013.

=== Winter ===
Winters are mild to moderately warm, with average high temperatures at the Downtown/USC weather station of 68 °F (20 °C) and lows of 48 °F (9 °C), with occasional heavy rainfall. Downtown/USC station has recorded a record-low high temperature of 43 °F or 6 °C on January 9, 1922. Regardless of this record, the high temperature almost never ever fails to hit 50 °F or 10 °C all winter long. Across the coastal basin, temperatures rarely drop below 40 °F (4 °C), although light frost does occasionally form during cooler nights, at least in areas removed from the direct influence of the coastal air (approximately 5 miles (8 km) inland from the beach). The last severe cold outbreak in the Los Angeles area occurred in December 1990, when temperatures dropped below freezing across a major portion of the coastal plain and into the low to mid-20s °F over inland valleys. Temperatures stayed below freezing for up to eight hours at some valley locations, resulting in significant damage to plants and commercial agriculture.

In the winter months, high-pressure systems over the deserts often bring Santa Ana winds, resulting in dry, and dusty days. On rare occasion, temperatures can reach into the 85 to 95 °F (29 to 35 °C) range during Santa Ana Winds even in December or January. Sunny skies characteristically dominate the weather pattern in the winter season, mixed in with the occasional rain producing weather system. Christmas on very rare occasion can feel like the Southern Hemisphere with a record high of 85 °F or 29 °C in 1980. Simultaneously, New York City on the East Coast had a record low of −1 °F or −18 °C the same day Christmas extremes in US. However, this type of heat does not occur each December, and milder conditions in the mid-60s to low 70s °F are generally expected throughout the Los Angeles region.

=== Spring and autumn ===
Spring and autumn hardly exist as such in this climate. Summer temperature patterns of 75 to 90 °F (24 to 32 °C) highs and 60 to 70 °F (16 to 21 °C) lows usually persist until early November. Likewise, the "winter-season" temperature pattern of 65 to 75 °F (18 to 24 °C) highs and 45 to 60 °F (7 to 16 °C) lows may last through April or May, periodically interrupted by hot Santa Ana wind events for up to a week at a time. The rainy season ends by mid-May. June is a transitional month consisting of less volatile temperatures between 60 and 80 °F (16 and 27 °C) and increased cloudy days, as well as the disappearance of the Santa Ana winds.

== Rainfall ==
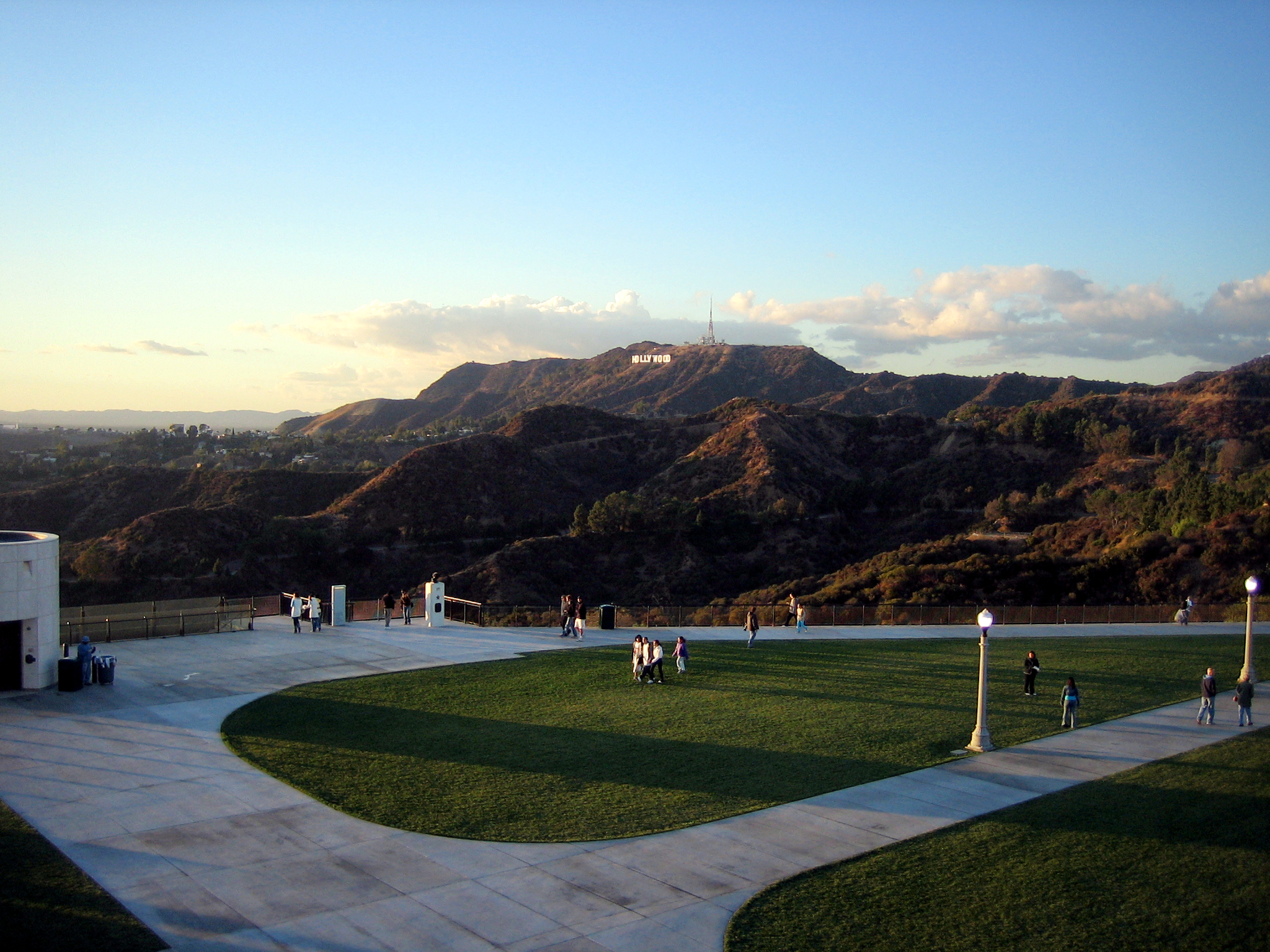
A very clear evening view of Mount Lee and the Hollywood Sign from the Griffith Observatory lawn, one day after a rain.

Most rain occurs during fall, winter and early to mid spring, typical of a Mediterranean climate. However, the amount received is usually lower than in other Mediterranean climates. The first sporadic rainfall of the rainy season usually occurs in October or November, with heavy rain becoming more common late November through early April. Pineapple Express storms may occur from December to March. On average, February is the wettest month. The rains then taper off in April or by May, which usually see only two to three light rain showers. However, the timing and volume of rains in the winter is highly variable. After a significant rain, the region's air is cleared of the usual atmospheric haze as well as man-made smog, giving exceptionally clear views across the expansive metropolis.

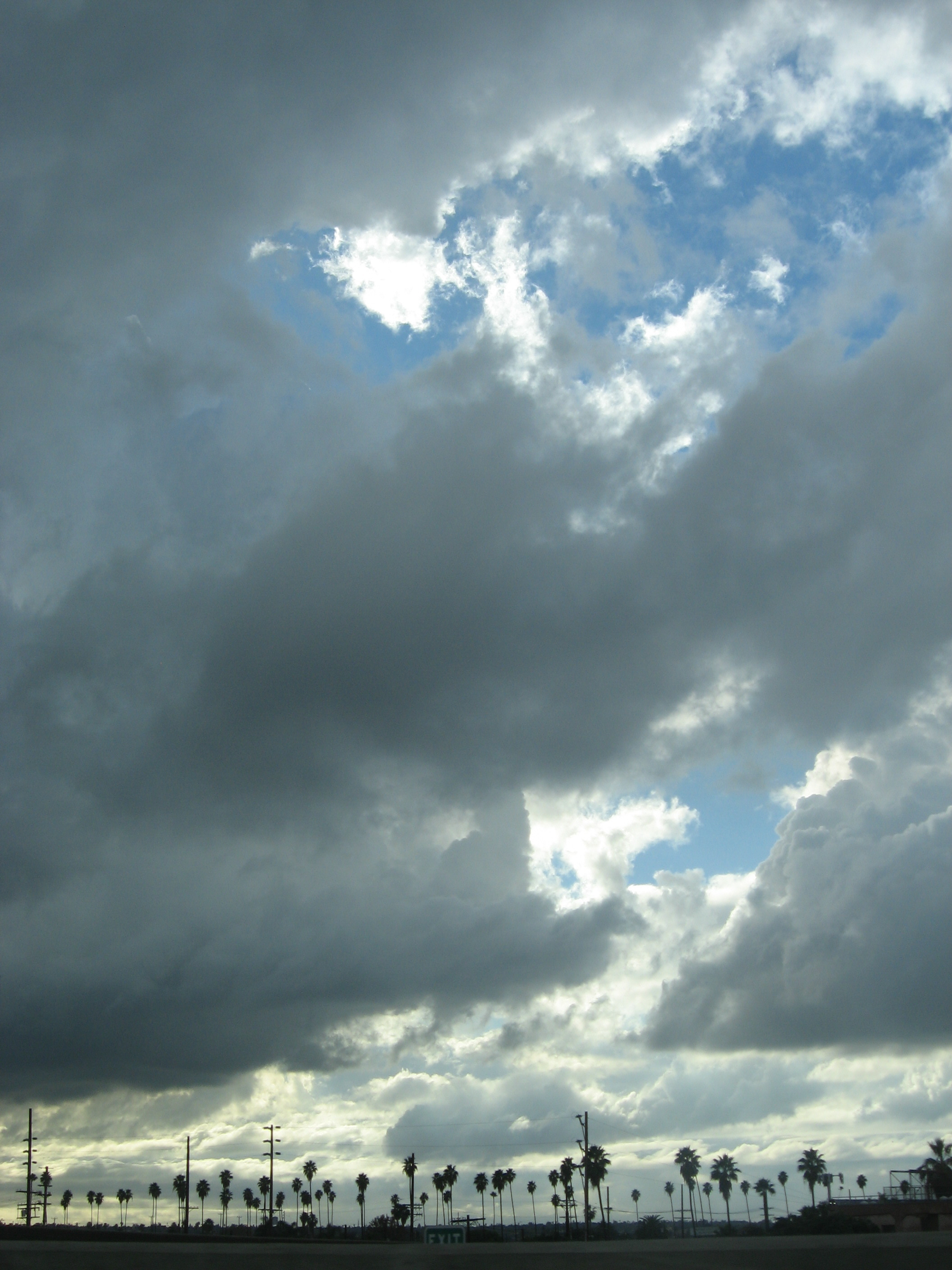
Rain clouds breaking up over South Los Angeles.

Most cold fronts and depressions spun off by the polar low, the strong winter seasonal low-pressure area in the Gulf of Alaska, fail to carry significant precipitable moisture as far south as Los Angeles, resulting in the region's relatively low average rainfall amount of 12–15 inches (300–380 mm) even in normal years. However, a "normal" year rarely occurs, since rainfall in Los Angeles is subject to the position and strength of the jet stream, and the strength of the Gulf of Alaska low. Some years, a well-developed series of cold fronts moves into the area with relatively short separation between each, bringing intermittently rainy periods to Los Angeles for several weeks at a time. If this pattern persists in a rainy season, significantly above-average precipitation will be received. Other years, especially in the drought years of 2012–2016, a blocking region of atmospheric high pressure over the eastern Pacific Ocean, between Alaska and the Pacific Northwest, diverts the jet stream and its flow of cold fronts far to the north through Canada and down into the U.S. Midwest, leaving the U.S. west coast and especially Los Angeles under warm and dry conditions for weeks to months at a time.

Because the rainy season begins in late fall and ends in early to mid spring, precipitation is measured using the water year instead of the calendar year to give an accurate picture of each rainy season's precipitation amounts. Each water year begins October 1 and ends the following September 30, during the driest part of the year.

Sometimes rainfall can occur in the summer from westward-straying monsoon thunderstorms, but this is unusual. Even less common is rain from remnants of dissipating eastern Pacific hurricanes. Los Angeles averages only 14.7 inches (373 mm) of precipitation per year, and this is lower at the coast and higher in the mountains and foothill cities. Snow is extremely rare in the Greater Los Angeles area and basin, but the nearby San Gabriel Mountains and San Bernardino Mountains typically receive a heavy amount of snow every winter season. The greatest snowfall recorded in downtown Los Angeles was 2 inches (5 cm) on January 15, 1932.

Los Angeles Airport has an estimated pan evaporation rate of 65.5 inches (1,664 mm) per year.

=== El Niño–Southern Oscillation ===
Historically, the warm phase of an El Niño–Southern Oscillation (ENSO) regime typically coincides with above-average precipitation across Southern California. The above-average sea-surface temperatures in the equatorial Pacific Ocean during ENSO are largely responsible for this as the ocean acts as a rich moisture source for tropical moisture to advect towards the North American continent in atmospheric river events. Prior to the strong El Niño of 2015–2016, the previous two strong El Niño events in 1982–83 and 1997–98 coincided with well above average precipitation across Southern California. While some measurements suggest the 2015-2016 El Niño was the strongest on record since 1950, Southern California received below average precipitation, contrary to what the Climate Prediction Center had predicted leading up to the winter months.

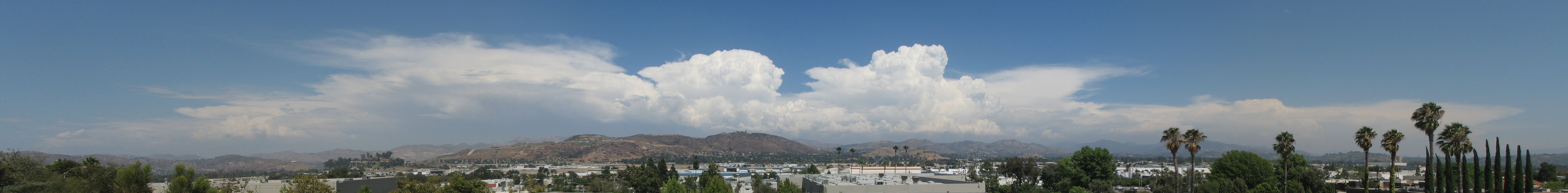
Cumulonimbus thunderheads from the North American Monsoon over the Low Desert, approximately 100 miles (160 km) southeast of Los Angeles, as seen from El Cajon, California.

== Surrounding areas in the region ==
=== Coastal basin ===
The Los Angeles Basin, composed of the coastal plain surrounded by mountains, is generally the coolest in summer and mildest in winter. Overall, it receives less rainfall than the surrounding valleys and mountains.

==== Los Angeles International Airport ====
Los Angeles International Airport and its surroundings (Westchester and El Segundo, as well as Santa Monica, Venice, and the immediately surrounding neighborhoods) are generally the coolest part of the region in the summer, as they receive a near-constant sea breeze. Santa Monica and its environs may be 10 to 15 °F (6 to 8 °C) cooler than areas only 5 miles (8.0 km) further inland. Under the Köppen climate classification, the airport has a semi-arid climate due to its modest winter rainfall and mild mean temperatures. For monthly statistics, see Climate of Los Angeles#Temperatures and seasons

==== Santa Monica ====
Santa Monica has mean temperatures low enough for its precipitation numbers to still retain a warm-summer Mediterranean climate (Csb).

Climate data for Santa Monica Pier, California (on the beach)
Month	Jan	Feb	Mar	Apr	May	Jun	Jul	Aug	Sep	Oct	Nov	Dec	Year
Mean daily maximum °F (°C)	63.7 (17.6)	63.4 (17.4)	62.1 (16.7)	63.4 (17.4)	63.6 (17.6)	65.9 (18.8)	68.8 (20.4)	70.3 (21.3)	70.5 (21.4)	69.6 (20.9)	67.3 (19.6)	64.8 (18.2)	66.1 (18.9)
Mean daily minimum °F (°C)	50.2 (10.1)	51.3 (10.7)	52.1 (11.2)	53.9 (12.2)	56.5 (13.6)	59.4 (15.2)	62.1 (16.7)	63.1 (17.3)	62.6 (17.0)	59.4 (15.2)	54.3 (12.4)	50.5 (10.3)	56.3 (13.5)
Average rainfall inches (mm)	3.06 (78)	3.29 (84)	2.56 (65)	0.53 (13)	0.25 (6.4)	0.04 (1.0)	0.01 (0.25)	0.13 (3.3)	0.17 (4.3)	0.36 (9.1)	1.02 (26)	1.85 (47)	13.27 (337.35)
Average rainy days	6.0	5.9	5.1	2.4	1.0	0.4	0.2	0.5	1.0	1.8	2.5	4.0	30.8
Source: NOAA

==== Culver City, Inglewood and Palms area ====
Culver City, Inglewood, Palms, and surrounding areas are only a few miles inland from Santa Monica and the beach, but reach temperatures up to 10 degrees (F) warmer on average in the summer. Culver City has a semi-arid climate that is still significantly moderated by the Pacific trade winds keeping averages mild compared to areas farther inland.

Climate data for Culver City, California
Month	Jan	Feb	Mar	Apr	May	Jun	Jul	Aug	Sep	Oct	Nov	Dec	Year
Mean daily maximum °F (°C)	67.3 (19.6)	68.6 (20.3)	69.3 (20.7)	72.6 (22.6)	73.5 (23.1)	77.1 (25.1)	80.0 (26.7)	81.1 (27.3)	80.2 (26.8)	77.0 (25.0)	71.6 (22.0)	67.7 (19.8)	73.8 (23.2)
Daily mean °F (°C)	56.7 (13.7)	57.9 (14.4)	59.2 (15.1)	62.3 (16.8)	64.6 (18.1)	68.0 (20.0)	70.8 (21.6)	71.7 (22.1)	70.8 (21.6)	67.1 (19.5)	61.2 (16.2)	57.0 (13.9)	63.9 (17.7)
Mean daily minimum °F (°C)	46.1 (7.8)	47.2 (8.4)	49.1 (9.5)	52.0 (11.1)	55.7 (13.2)	58.8 (14.9)	61.5 (16.4)	62.2 (16.8)	61.3 (16.3)	57.2 (14.0)	50.8 (10.4)	46.3 (7.9)	54.0 (12.2)
Average rainfall inches (mm)	3.19 (81)	3.25 (83)	2.66 (68)	0.58 (15)	0.26 (6.6)	0.04 (1.0)	0.02 (0.51)	0.07 (1.8)	0.08 (2.0)	0.33 (8.4)	0.94 (24)	1.90 (48)	13.32 (338)
Average rainy days (≥ 0.01 inch)	5.7	5.3	5.8	1.7	0.7	0.2	0.3	0.2	0.6	1.1	1.9	4.0	27.5
Source: NOAA

==== Long Beach ====
Long Beach, located in the coastal basin about 20 miles (30 km) to the south of downtown Los Angeles, has a coastally-influenced climate, but is not as cool as Santa Monica, or the Westside, or the South Bay during the summer. Long Beach sits on a south-facing section of coast, and does not receive as much sea breeze cooling from the prevailing westerly/south-westerly winds (as these winds may pass over the Palos Verdes Peninsula, San Pedro, and the twin ports first). Long Beach's high temperature can compete with those of downtown Los Angeles. Locations further north in Long Beach, which stretches over 8.5 miles (13.7 km) northward from the water, can be considerably warmer than Long Beach's coast and airport weather station.

Climate data for Long Beach, California (Long Beach Airport)
Month	Jan	Feb	Mar	Apr	May	Jun	Jul	Aug	Sep	Oct	Nov	Dec	Year
Record high °F (°C)	93 (34)	91 (33)	98 (37)	105 (41)	104 (40)	109 (43)	107 (42)	105 (41)	111 (44)	111 (44)	101 (38)	92 (33)	111 (44)
Mean daily maximum °F (°C)	67.4 (19.7)	67.2 (19.6)	68.6 (20.3)	71.7 (22.1)	73.6 (23.1)	76.7 (24.8)	81.9 (27.7)	83.8 (28.8)	82.1 (27.8)	77.2 (25.1)	72.1 (22.3)	66.8 (19.3)	74.1 (23.4)
Daily mean °F (°C)	56.7 (13.7)	57.6 (14.2)	59.6 (15.3)	62.4 (16.9)	65.6 (18.7)	68.9 (20.5)	73.2 (22.9)	74.3 (23.5)	72.7 (22.6)	67.7 (19.8)	61.4 (16.3)	56.3 (13.5)	64.7 (18.2)
Mean daily minimum °F (°C)	46.1 (7.8)	48.0 (8.9)	50.5 (10.3)	53.2 (11.8)	57.6 (14.2)	61.0 (16.1)	64.5 (18.1)	64.9 (18.3)	63.2 (17.3)	58.3 (14.6)	50.8 (10.4)	45.8 (7.7)	55.3 (12.9)
Record low °F (°C)	25 (−4)	33 (1)	33 (1)	38 (3)	40 (4)	47 (8)	51 (11)	51 (11)	50 (10)	39 (4)	34 (1)	28 (−2)	25 (−4)
Average rainfall inches (mm)	2.60 (66)	3.09 (78)	1.87 (47)	0.60 (15)	0.21 (5.3)	0.07 (1.8)	0.03 (0.76)	0.03 (0.76)	0.18 (4.6)	0.63 (16)	1.00 (25)	1.95 (50)	12.26 (311)
Average rainy days (≥ 0.01 in)	5.9	6.5	5.3	3.1	1.1	0.7	0.5	0.3	0.9	2.5	3.4	5.0	35.2
Source: NOAA

=== San Fernando Valley ===
The San Fernando Valley is known for significantly higher temperatures than the coastal basin. Canoga Park and Woodland Hills, in the south-west end of the valley, typically record the highest temperatures. The Los Angeles city limits' all-time high of 121 °F (49 °C) nearly rivals the record high temperatures of Phoenix, Arizona (122 °F or 50 °C) and Palm Springs (123 °F or 51 °C). The city of Burbank, at the eastern end of the Valley, is also known for being significantly hotter than downtown Los Angeles, which is only 9 miles (14 km) to the south. During winter both the Canoga Park and Burbank weather stations are significantly wetter than some coastal stations and thus retain hot-summer Mediterranean climates (Csa). By comparison, Canoga Park has quite cool summer nights, in contrast to many other interior Southern California areas.

Climate data for Los Angeles (Canoga Park, in the San Fernando Valley)
Month	Jan	Feb	Mar	Apr	May	Jun	Jul	Aug	Sep	Oct	Nov	Dec	Year
Record high °F (°C)	93 (34)	94 (34)	101 (38)	105 (41)	113 (45)	113 (45)	115 (46)	116 (47)	115 (46)	110 (43)	101 (38)	96 (36)	116 (47)
Mean daily maximum °F (°C)	67.9 (19.9)	69.9 (21.1)	72.0 (22.2)	77.7 (25.4)	81.3 (27.4)	88.8 (31.6)	95.0 (35.0)	96.0 (35.6)	91.7 (33.2)	84.4 (29.1)	74.7 (23.7)	68.8 (20.4)	80.7 (27.1)
Daily mean °F (°C)	53.7 (12.1)	55.4 (13.0)	57.2 (14.0)	61.3 (16.3)	65.2 (18.4)	71.0 (21.7)	76.0 (24.4)	76.8 (24.9)	73.5 (23.1)	66.8 (19.3)	58.2 (14.6)	53.6 (12.0)	64.1 (17.8)
Mean daily minimum °F (°C)	39.5 (4.2)	40.9 (4.9)	42.3 (5.7)	44.8 (7.1)	49.1 (9.5)	53.2 (11.8)	56.9 (13.8)	57.6 (14.2)	55.2 (12.9)	49.2 (9.6)	41.7 (5.4)	38.3 (3.5)	47.4 (8.6)
Record low °F (°C)	19 (−7)	18 (−8)	26 (−3)	30 (−1)	33 (1)	36 (2)	42 (6)	42 (6)	38 (3)	27 (−3)	23 (−5)	20 (−7)	18 (−8)
Average rainfall inches (mm)	3.83 (97)	4.40 (112)	3.60 (91)	0.88 (22)	0.32 (8.1)	0.07 (1.8)	0.01 (0.25)	0.15 (3.8)	0.24 (6.1)	0.62 (16)	1.29 (33)	2.38 (60)	17.79 (451.05)
Average rainy days	6.2	5.9	6.1	3.0	1.3	0.4	0.1	0.7	1.3	2.0	3.2	4.4	34.6
Source: NOAA

Climate data for Burbank, California
Month	Jan	Feb	Mar	Apr	May	Jun	Jul	Aug	Sep	Oct	Nov	Dec	Year
Record high °F (°C)	93 (34)	92 (33)	98 (37)	105 (41)	107 (42)	111 (44)	114 (46)	111 (44)	114 (46)	108 (42)	102 (39)	95 (35)	114 (46)
Mean daily maximum °F (°C)	70 (21)	71 (22)	74 (23)	77 (25)	82 (28)	85 (29)	90 (32)	92 (33)	91 (33)	83 (28)	76 (24)	70 (21)	80 (27)
Mean daily minimum °F (°C)	45 (7)	46 (8)	47 (8)	50 (10)	55 (13)	61 (16)	64 (18)	65 (18)	63 (17)	57 (14)	48 (9)	45 (7)	54 (12)
Record low °F (°C)	22 (−6)	27 (−3)	22 (−6)	32 (0)	39 (4)	43 (6)	45 (7)	46 (8)	43 (6)	33 (1)	29 (−2)	22 (−6)	22 (−6)
Average rainfall inches (mm)	3.53 (90)	4.62 (117)	2.97 (75)	1.11 (28)	.35 (8.9)	.11 (2.8)	.02 (0.51)	.07 (1.8)	.23 (5.8)	.97 (25)	1.07 (27)	2.40 (61)	17.45 (442.81)
Source: Weather.com

=== Orange County ===
==== North/Central Orange County ====
The climate of Santa Ana, the county seat of Orange County, as well as Anaheim, both in north-central Orange County, are quite similar, and typical of locations on the coastal plain 10 to 15 miles (16 to 24 km) inland from the beach. Whilst Santa Ana sits firmly on the border between the semi-arid and the hot-summer Mediterranean climate, Anaheim is firmly a semi-arid climate with very low precipitation for the Los Angeles metropolitan area.

Climate data for Santa Ana, California
Month	Jan	Feb	Mar	Apr	May	Jun	Jul	Aug	Sep	Oct	Nov	Dec	Year
Mean daily maximum °F (°C)	69 (21)	70 (21)	71 (22)	74 (23)	75 (24)	79 (26)	83 (28)	84 (29)	83 (28)	80 (27)	74 (23)	70 (21)	76 (24)
Mean daily minimum °F (°C)	47 (8)	48 (9)	50 (10)	52 (11)	56 (13)	60 (16)	63 (17)	64 (18)	63 (17)	58 (14)	51 (11)	46 (8)	55 (13)
Average rainfall inches (mm)	3.19 (81)	3.03 (77)	2.8 (71)	0.67 (17)	0.24 (6.1)	0.12 (3.0)	0.04 (1.0)	0.12 (3.0)	0.35 (8.9)	0.35 (8.9)	1.18 (30)	1.77 (45)	13.86 (351.9)
Source: U.S. Climate Data

Climate data for Anaheim, California
Month	Jan	Feb	Mar	Apr	May	Jun	Jul	Aug	Sep	Oct	Nov	Dec	Year
Mean daily maximum °F (°C)	69 (21)	69 (21)	70 (21)	73 (23)	75 (24)	79 (26)	84 (29)	86 (30)	85 (29)	80 (27)	74 (23)	70 (21)	76 (24)
Mean daily minimum °F (°C)	45 (7)	47 (8)	48 (9)	51 (11)	56 (13)	60 (16)	65 (18)	65 (18)	63 (17)	56 (13)	51 (11)	44 (7)	54 (12)
Average rainfall inches (mm)	2.4 (61)	2.8 (71)	2.5 (64)	0.6 (15)	0.1 (2.5)	0.1 (2.5)	0.0 (0.0)	0.0 (0.0)	0.1 (2.5)	0.2 (5.1)	0.8 (20)	1.3 (33)	10.9 (276.6)
Source: U.S. Climate Data

== Extreme weather ==
=== Records ===
In downtown Los Angeles, weather records began on July 1, 1877. The highest temperature recorded in downtown Los Angeles was 113 °F (45 °C) on September 27, 2010. The lowest temperature was 28 °F (−2 °C) on January 7, 1913, and on January 4, 1949. The wettest “rain year” from July to the following June was 1883/1884 with 38.18 inches (969.8 mm), and the driest 2006/2007 with 3.21 inches (81.5 mm). The greatest rainfall in one month was 15.80 inches (401.3 mm) in December 1889, which also had the most days – twenty – receiving at least 0.01 inches (0.3 mm) of rain. The greatest rainfall in 24 hours was 5.68 inches (144.3 mm) on March 2, 1938.

At Los Angeles International Airport, the highest recorded temperature was 110 °F (43 °C) on September 26, 1963. The lowest temperature was 27 °F (−3 °C) on January 4, 1949. The wettest year was 1983 with 29.46 inches (748 mm) and the driest year was 1947 with 2.95 inches (74.9 mm). The greatest rainfall in one month was 13.79 inches (350 mm) in February 1998. The greatest rainfall in 24 hours was 5.60 inches (142.2 mm) on November 21, 1967.

In Long Beach, the highest recorded temperature was 111 °F (44 °C) on October 16, 1958, and October 15, 1961, and again on September 27, 2010. The lowest temperature was 21 °F (−6 °C) on January 20, 1922. The wettest year was 1978 with 27.67 inches (703 mm). The driest year was 2002 with 2.63 inches (66.8 mm). The greatest rainfall in one month was 14.50 inches (368 mm) in January 1969, including a record 24-hour rainfall of 6.71 inches (170.4 mm) on January 20 that month.

In San Fernando Valley, the highest recorded temperature was 121 °F (49 °C) on September 6, 2020. The lowest temperature was 18 °F (−8 °C) on February 6, 1989.

Snowfall inside the city of Los Angeles is rare. The record snowfall occurred on January 19, 1949, when 3.0 inches (7.6 cm) of snow fell inside city limits, however Burbank reported 120 millimetres (4.7 inches). Since official records were first kept in 1877, the downtown Los Angeles weather station observed measurable snowfall three times, in 1882, 1932, and 1949.

=== Santa Ana winds ===
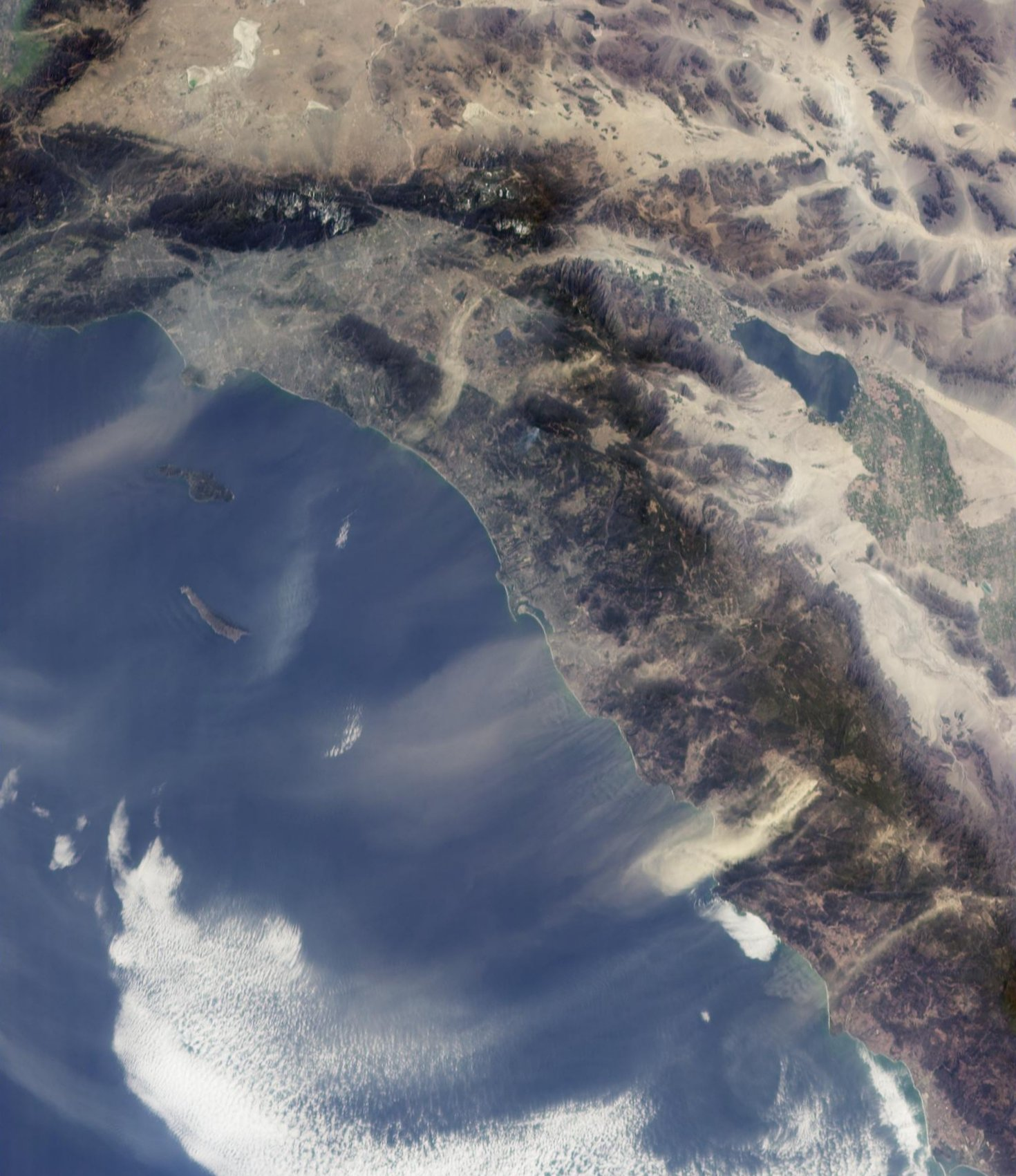
The Santa Ana winds in Southern California sweep from the deserts and across the Los Angeles metropolitan area pushing smoke from wildfires far out into the Pacific Ocean.

The Santa Ana winds are strong, extremely dry offshore winds that characteristically sweep across Southern California and northern Baja California during late September into early May. They range from hot to cold, depending on the prevailing temperatures in the source region, the Great Basin and upper Mojave Desert. These winds are notorious for causing hot, dry weather due to compressional heating of the lower atmosphere.

Notable Santa Ana windstorms happen several times a year between fall and spring. Once every several years a strong windstorm causes significant damage, toppling or uprooting large old trees and damaging structures across the region.

=== Heavy rains, landslides, and debris flows ===
While overall precipitation is low, the rain that does fall occasionally comes in brief heavy storms. Combined with steep mountain slopes and recent burn areas from wildfires, these heavy rains often cause landslides and debris flows in foothill areas, damaging structures and blocking roads.

=== Thunderstorms, lightning, and tornadoes ===
Textbook cumulonimbus-formed summer thunderstorms are fairly rare in Los Angeles, because the atmosphere over the coastal basin is generally too stable and dry, especially during summer, to allow the strong vertical development necessary for mature cumulonimbus clouds. Full, mature thunderstorms can develop in the surrounding deserts and mountains during the summer North American Monsoon, but rarely over the Los Angeles metropolitan region and coastal basin, where the moisture is coming off of the Gulf of Mexico and the Gulf of California. This atmospheric stability is largely due to the cool and persistent marine layer, which is fueled by the constant influx of cold Pacific water via the California Current. Summer thunderstorms that do manage to form on the coastal basin are typically associated with the North American Monsoon and/or tropical cyclones, or downburst winds followed by weak tornadoes, which can bring enough tropical heat and moisture to overcome the cool marine layer, destabilizing the atmosphere.

Though still relatively rare, thunderstorms most often occur during warm southerly-flow winter rain storms. These warm storms are different from the typical northwesterly cold fronts that bring most of the region's winter precipitation. Atmospheric instability caused by these warm winter storm systems allows the formation of small, weak, isolated thunderstorms, which tend to move across the area quickly, producing a few rumbles of thunder, and soon dissipate back into the larger rain storm system. Occasionally, these bring impressive displays of lightning, hail, and damaging winds to small localities within the region. Small, weak, isolated tornadoes can occur during these events, but are exceedingly rare. Likewise, weak-to-moderate-strength waterspouts may form over the ocean (typically off the stretch of coast between Long Beach and Huntington Beach) during warm winter storms, but again, this is very rare.

== Sea temperatures ==
The average annual temperature of the sea is 63 °F (17 °C), from 58 °F (14 °C) in January to 68 °F (20 °C) in August.

Average sea temperature:
Jan	Feb	Mar	Apr	May	Jun	Jul	Aug	Sep	Oct	Nov	Dec	Year
58 °F (14 °C)	58 °F (14 °C)	60 °F (16 °C)	60 °F (16 °C)	61 °F (16 °C)	63 °F (17 °C)	66 °F (19 °C)	68 °F (20 °C)	67 °F (19 °C)	66 °F (19 °C)	64 °F (18 °C)	60 °F (16 °C)	63 °F (17 °C)

== Ultraviolet index ==
Ultraviolet index
Jan	Feb	Mar	Apr	May	Jun	Jul	Aug	Sep	Oct	Nov	Dec	Year
3	4	6	8	9	10	11	10	8	6	4	3	6.8
