= Earthquake light =

Reported luminous phenomenon associated with earthquakes

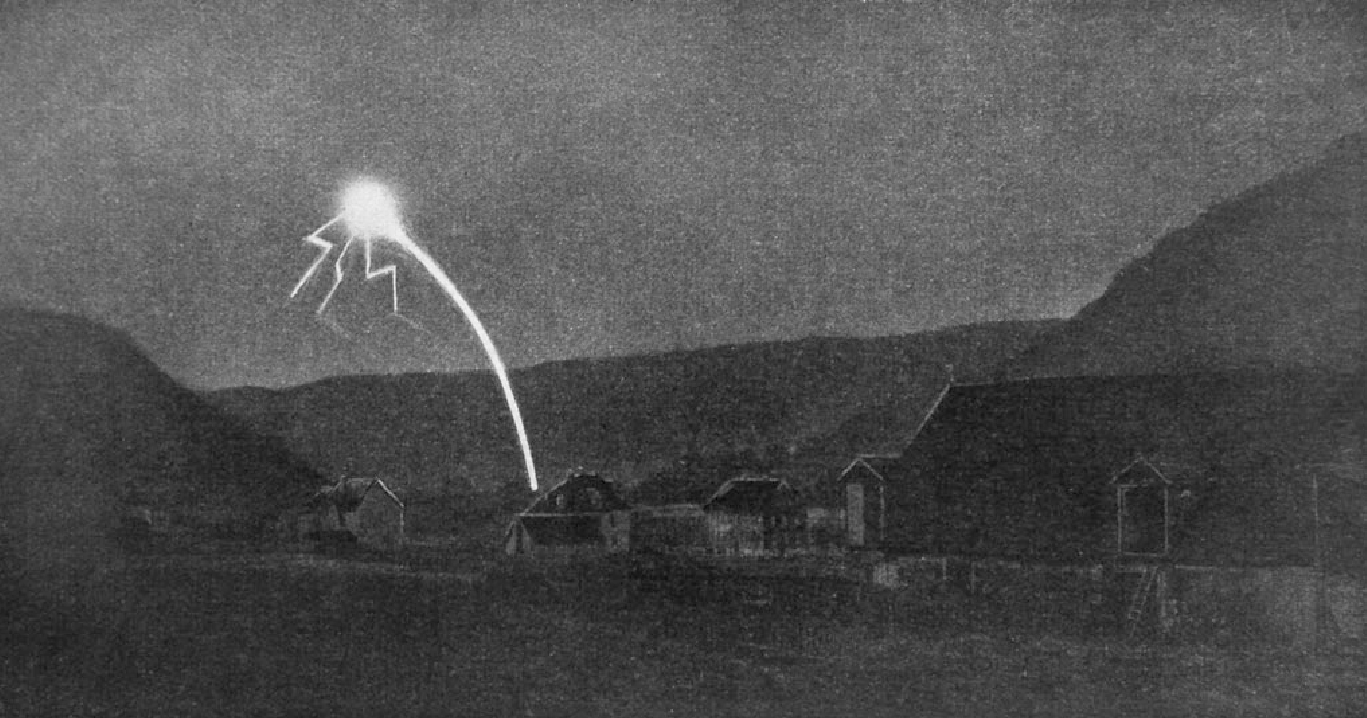
Eyewitness drawing of earthquake lights during the 1911 Ebingen earthquake

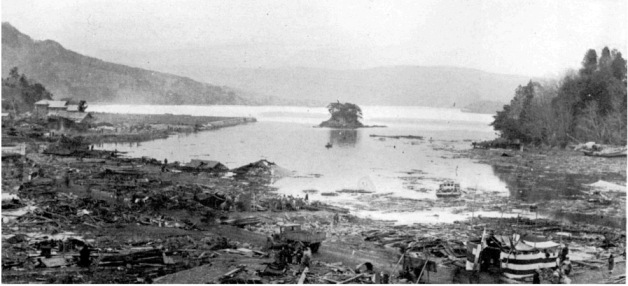
Massakicho Town, Ōfunato Bay after the 1933 Sanriku earthquakes, where reports described bluish-white luminescence over seabed exposed by receding tsunami waters

An earthquake light, also known as earthquake lightning or an earthquake flash, is a reported luminous phenomenon that is said to be associated with tectonic stress or seismic activity. Reports describe flashes, glows, luminous orbs, sheet-like lights, streamers, and other transient lights observed before, during, or after earthquakes and at varying distances from earthquake sites. (Note: USGS describes sheet lightning, balls of light, streamers, and steady glows; other reports cite glowing orbs; Matsushiro reports (JMA; Nagano City Museum) include lights in multiple colors; and China Earthquake Networks Center lists earth lights as band-like, sheet-like, spherical, columnar, and fire-like. National Geographic notes lights were reported weeks before or during major earthquakes; the Encyclopedia of Solid Earth Geophysics defines them as linked to seismic stress; and reports include lights up to 110 km (70 mi).) Experts differ on whether the reports describe a single real phenomenon, multiple unrelated phenomena, or misidentified natural and artificial light sources, and there is no consensus on a confirmed geological mechanism. Some authors use the term more narrowly for lights reported close in time to seismic events, rather than for unexplained lights merely observed near faults or in earthquake-prone regions.

Reports of luminous phenomena associated with earthquakes trace back to ancient historical accounts. Photographs from the 1960s Matsushiro earthquake swarm in Japan have been described as the first photographic records of earthquake lights. (Note: Physics World, National Geographic, the Nagano City Museum, and JMA state earthquake lights were first captured on film in the 1960s at Matsushiro; JMA records ten photographic examples by Tōru Kuribayashi and notes ground sounds and luminous phenomena throughout the swarm. Smithsonian describes those photographs as the point scientists acknowledged the phenomenon's validity.) Later reports and recordings have accompanied earthquakes in Asia, Europe, and the Americas, though many individual cases remain difficult to evaluate because of limited images, eyewitness uncertainty, coinciding weather, and electrical-grid failures. Proposed explanations have included piezoelectricity, electrokinetic effects, triboelectric or fracture-electrification mechanisms, and rock-stress ionization models. Other reported lights have been attributed to non-seismic causes such as lightning, arcing power lines, or power-grid disturbances.

== History ==
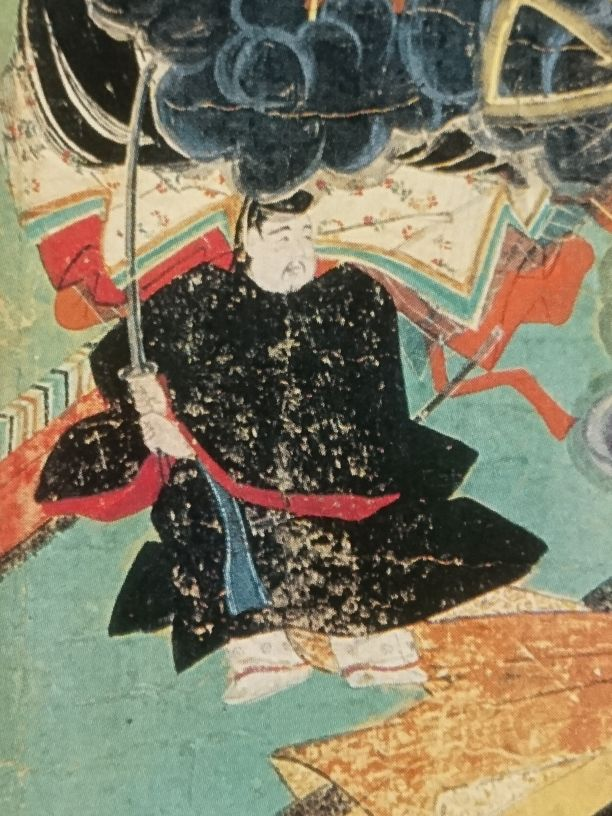
Fujiwara no Tokihira recorded one of the earliest known reports of earthquake lights in 901, from the 869 Jōgan earthquake: 流光如晝隱映 ("flowing light bright as day, flickering").

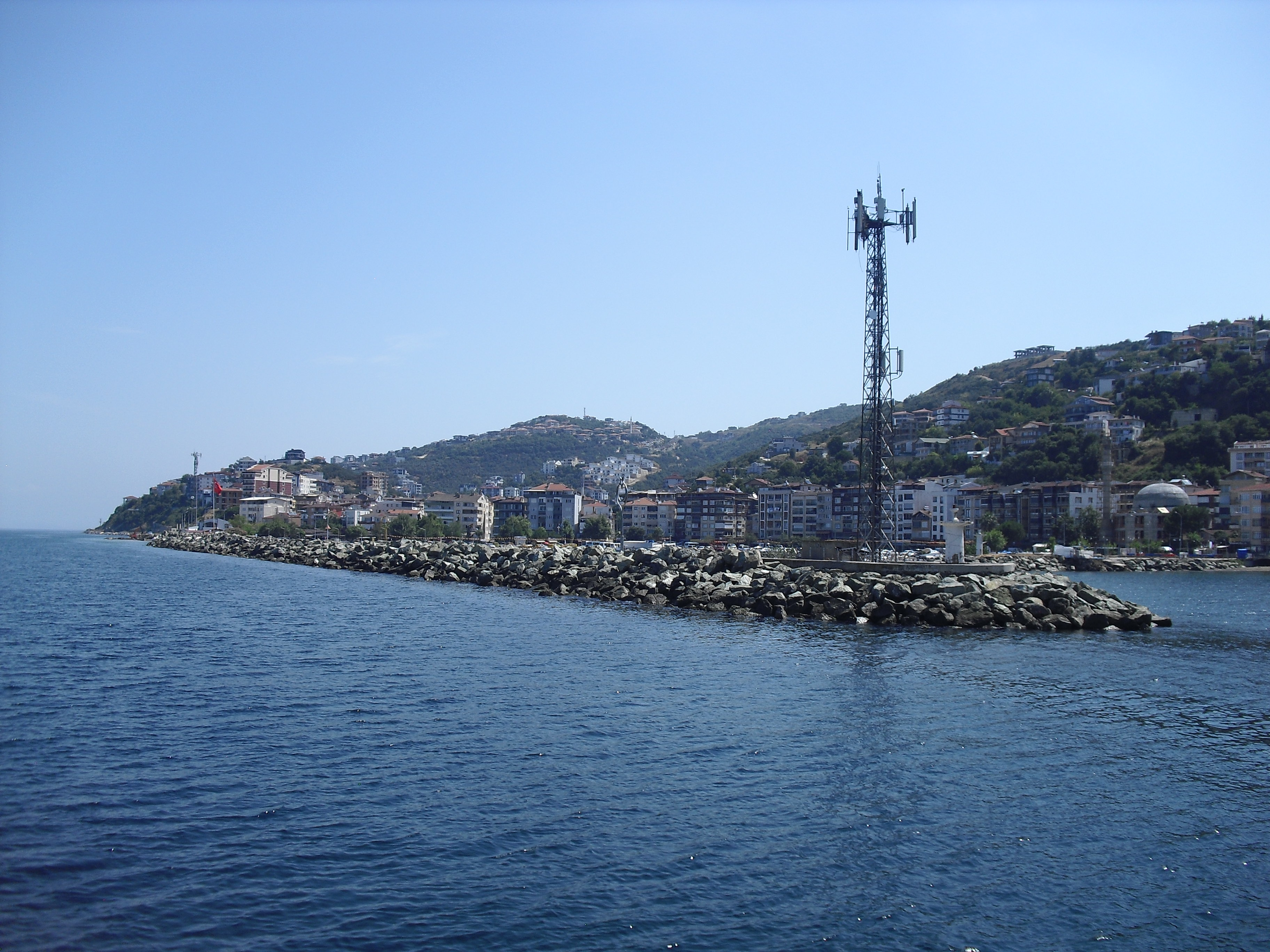
Çınarcık on the Sea of Marmara, near where luminous phenomena were discussed in reports following the 1999 İzmit earthquake

Luminous phenomena associated with earthquakes have been reported for millennia, as early as the 4th century BCE. (Note: The chronological and geographic range of reported earthquake light accounts, not the verification of each individual report. The Encyclopedia of Solid Earth Geophysics entry traces reported earthquake lights to the 373 BCE Helice and Buris earthquake and discusses later reports including the 1988 Saguenay earthquake in Quebec.) Donga Science said that sixty-five reports of "earthquake-related aerial luminescence" between the 18th and 20th centuries were made across the Americas and Europe.

=== Reports through the nineteenth century ===
Historical and cultural records related to phenomena such as earthquake lights are well documented in East Asian countries with long histories of damaging earthquakes. (Note: For the broader Asian folklore and historical context around earthquake associated luminous phenomena, see Ikeya. For Chinese historical accounts of earthquake-associated luminous phenomena, see Kishimoto. For Japanese historical records and later collections of luminous phenomena associated with earthquakes, see the Nagoya University workshop report, Derr's 1973 review, and the Encyclopedia of Solid Earth Geophysics.) The oldest reported examples include accounts from the 373 BCE destruction of Helice and Buris, and reports from Italy in 89 BCE. Reports of earthquake lights accompanied the 869 Jōgan earthquake, described as "strange lights in the sky" in 901's Nihon Sandai Jitsuroku, part of the Rikkokushi or Six National Histories, the final volume curated for the Japanese government by Fujiwara no Tokihira. Japanese earthquake light folklore includes older sayings, later cited in a 2004 survey, that associated fire-like red light at night with a nearby large earthquake or tsunami and warned that "red clouds at nine o'clock on a dark night" meant an earthquake was coming.

Reports of light effects accompanied the 1822 Valparaíso earthquake. A "luminous appearance" in the sky was also reported around the North Canterbury earthquake in New Zealand on September 1, 1888. In the 19th century, geologist Frederick Hutton wrote in his report to the Royal Society of New Zealand that he did not believe lights observed in the sky nearby had any connection to seismic activity.

=== Twentieth-century reports and research ===
During the 1911 earthquake at Ebingen, Germany, factory foreman Friedrich Konzelmann observed and drew a ground flash that rose into a ball of light he described as "about the size of 20 suns". In 1911, John Milne reviewed Ignazio Galli's catalogue of 148 luminous phenomena reported around earthquakes. A 2005 study described earlier Japanese research by K. Musha and Torahiko Terada as pioneering work on luminous phenomena associated with earthquakes; Musha collected about 2,000 eyewitness reports from 65 earthquakes, while Terada considered triboluminescence but found it difficult to explain some reported luminous phenomena that way. Members of the Earthquake Research Institute reported observing earthquake lights during the 1930 North Izu events and later gathered nearly 1,500 eyewitness accounts, including sketches and outlines of the lights.

According to Physics World and other sources, earthquake lights were "first captured on film" in the 1960s. The Nagano City Museum described the 1965–1967 Matsushiro earthquake swarm as the first earthquake sequence in which luminous phenomena associated with earthquakes were photographed, crediting the photographs to local dentist Tōru Kuribayashi. Smithsonian described the 1965 Nagano photographs as the point at which scientists acknowledged the phenomenon's validity. However, some seismologists suggested the photos captured during the Matsushiro earthquake swarm may have been forgeries, including Tsuneji Rikitake.

Lights were reported before the 1930 North Izu and 1976 Tangshan earthquakes. In 1970, David Finkelstein and James R. Powell framed earthquake lightning as a possible "seismoelectric effect" in which seismic strains from an earthquake generate an electric field in the air. In a 1973 review in Bulletin of the Seismological Society of America, J. S. Derr wrote, "the existence of the phenomenon is considered well-established, although no completely satisfactory explanation has been advanced to date." In 1978, T. Neil Davis wrote of the earthquake lights photographed in 1965 and that the phenomenon was no longer in "shadows of scientific skepticism." Lights were reported with the 1988 Saguenay earthquake.

Reports of lights before earthquakes were also associated with the 1995 Hanshin earthquake. After the 1999 İzmit earthquake in Turkey, a report circulated claiming volcanic activity in the Sea of Marmara near Çınarcık, including "fireballs", dead fish, burned nets, and rocks described as "magmatic". The Smithsonian Institution's Global Volcanism Program classified the account as a false volcanic report, stated that no volcanism was reported by geologists working in Turkey after the earthquake and that the alleged samples were not made available for scientific follow-up. The Smithsonian bulletin suggested that the reported lights could have been earthquake lights. A separate Earthquake Engineering Field Investigation Team (EEFIT) field report on the earthquake recorded tsunami evidence, slumping, liquefaction, and reports of a luminous red glow in the sky around the time of the earthquake.

=== Twenty-first-century reports and recordings ===
Reports of earthquake lights motivated the creation of QuakeFinder, which gathered related telemetry to attempt forecasting of seismic events from 2000 to 2023. Lights coinciding with tectonic activity have sometimes been filmed by witnesses or security cameras, dashcams, and smartphones. The first known recording of earthquake lights was during the 2007 Peru earthquake, while reports of lights before earthquakes later included the 2008 Sichuan earthquake in China and the 2009 L'Aquila earthquake in Italy. Earthquake prediction research in Korea by 2010 examined the use of earthquake lights as a trackable seismic precursor. Later recordings included the 2010 Chile earthquakes.

A 2016 article in Mediterranean Archaeology and Archaeometry examined religious and cultural traditions shaped by interpretations of earthquake lights, using Greek Orthodox legends about St. George Monastery near Cape Fiolent in Ukraine and Panagia Trypiti in Aigio, Greece as examples. Lights were also reported during the 2016 Ecuador earthquake in San Isidro, Pedernales, and Canoa, and as far as Guayaquil. Earthquake lights were reportedly spotted in Mexico City after a 8.2 magnitude earthquake with epicenter 740 km (460 mi) away, near Pijijiapan in the state of Chiapas.

Christina Nunez, writing in National Geographic in 2020, said that the United States Geological Survey (USGS) was "circumspect" about the existence of earthquake lights, quoting it that geophysicists disagreed on whether any existing evidence represented the existence of earthquake lights, while others thought some evidence may correspond to earthquake lights. Later reports and recordings included the 2022 Düzce earthquake in Turkey, a magnitude 6.8 aftershock of the 2022 Michoacán earthquake, and the 2023 Al Haouz earthquake at Marrakesh.

== Reported details ==
Inherent challenges in studying earthquake lights include the lack of a confirmed and accepted geological mechanism, and difficulties establishing criteria for including eyewitness reports or excluding them as the result of another known cause, such as coinciding weather or atmospheric phenomena. There are few reliable images or photographs of claimed earthquake lights. Earthquake lights of various types have been reported before, during, and after earthquakes. The lights have been reported as white or blue flashes and as glowing orbs. The 2021 Guerrero earthquake near Acapulco in Mexico included reports of "blue lights, like flashes of cerulean". In 2023, New Scientist reported that the idea of "blue flashes" having been caused by earthquakes "is often dismissed by scientists."

The Encyclopedia of Solid Earth Geophysics defines earthquake lights as anomalous luminosities observed prior to or during a seismic event, or during an aftershock sequence. The Korea Meteorological Administration identified earthquake lights as "luminous phenomena in the sky seen before earthquakes". The China Earthquake Networks Center, in public education material on earthquake macro-precursors, stated that earth lights generally appear shortly before or during earthquakes, may also appear hours or earlier beforehand, and have been reported in band-like, sheet-like, spherical, columnar, and fire-like forms. Accounts of viewable distance from the epicenter varies: in the 1930 North Izu earthquake lights were reported up to 110 km (70 mi) from the epicenter. According to National Geographic, earthquake lights were previously reported in North America and Japan among other locations, but are more common in South America, China, France, Germany, Greece, and Italy.

JMA reported details about and specific to the 1960s Matsushiro earthquake swarm luminous phenomena, which the Nagano City Museum summarized: during the incidents phenomena were more likely at certain times of day, lasted tens of seconds, brightening suddenly, and then fading gradually. Reports of lights at Matsushiro were generally accompanied by atmospherics, appeared in white, bluish white, red, pink, orange, and yellow, and were sometimes bright enough to be mistaken for a fire or daylight. Reports from the 1896 and 1933 Sanriku earthquakes described bluish-white luminescence over seabed exposed by receding tsunami waters, with later accounts saying the glow continued on the sea surface until waves returned to shore.

== Proposed theories ==
Several proposed theories of earthquake lights share the idea that tectonic stress generates electric charge or polarization in rock that then produces light, including piezoelectricity, electrokinetic effects involving streaming potentials in water-filled porous rock, and triboelectric or fracture-electrification mechanisms. Other proposals have included frictional heating and vaporization near shear zones and exo-electron emission. Rock-stress models, including positive hole charge carrier models, have proposed that stressed rocks can generate mobile effects that migrate toward the surface, ionize air, and produce corona discharges, plasma, and light. Some research suggests the angle of the fault is related to the likelihood of earthquake light generation, with subvertical faults in continental rift environments having the highest reported incidence of earthquake lights.

Seismologist Miguel Angel Santoyo of the School of Sciences, UNAM told Nova that the lights that appeared in social media videos after the 2021 Guerrero earthquake was felt in Mexico City were caused by a combination of lightning from an ordinary thunderstorm that was in progress at the time of the quake, and from electrical arcing as power lines swayed during the shaking. Fellow UNAM seismologist Víctor Manuel Cruz summarized the lights as "nothing more than lightning on a rainy day." Nova also reported that some of the lights in the videos appeared to have been caused by transformers blowing due to the sudden seismic activity. Some reported occurrences of earthquake lights have later been shown to originate from disruptions to electrical grids, such as arcing power lines, which can produce bright flashes as a result of ground shaking or hazardous weather conditions.

== See also ==
- Ball lightning
- Earthquake prediction
- Earthquake weather
- Seismo-electromagnetics
