= Subterranean rumbling =

Sound generated by earthquakes

Subterranean rumbling is a phenomenon in which the ground vibrates and makes sounds due to an earthquake.

During earthquakes or volcanic eruptions, the ground vibrates, sometimes creating short-period seismic wave motion (ground motion) that reaches the air and becomes sounds (sound waves), and low sounds can be heard.

This often occurs during shallow-focus earthquakes and earthquake swarms. Even microearthquakes that produce noticeable tremors can sometimes produce rumbling.

Hard ground tends to amplify rumbling.

In earthquake-prone Japan rumbling is frequently observed near Mt. Tsukuba in Ibaraki Prefecture. This is believed to be due to local exposure of basement rocks. During the 1965 Matsushiro earthquake swarm, a remarkable subterranean rumbling was observed.
