= Climate of California =

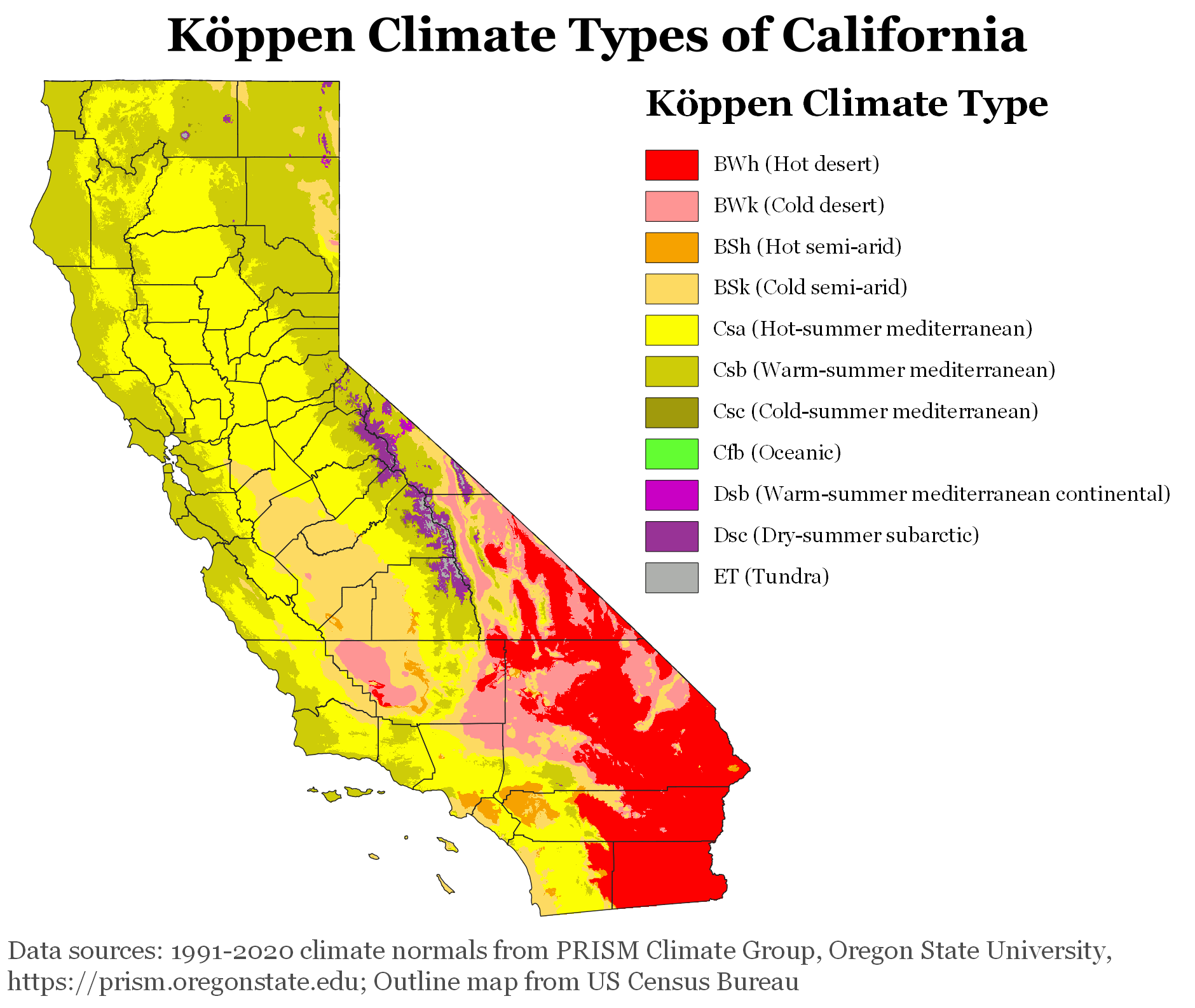
Köppen climate types of California, using 1991–2020 climate normals

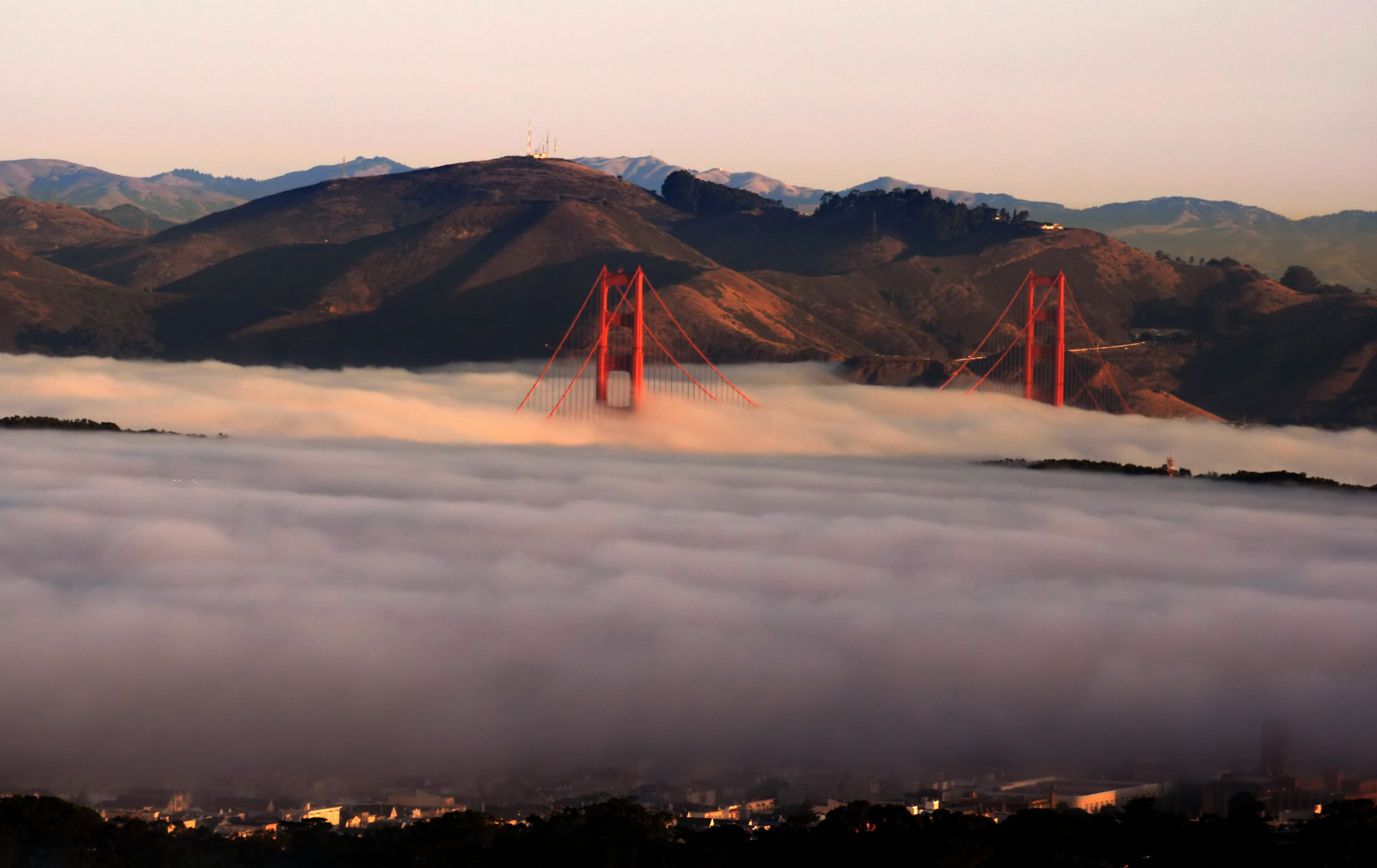
Golden Gate Bridge in fog

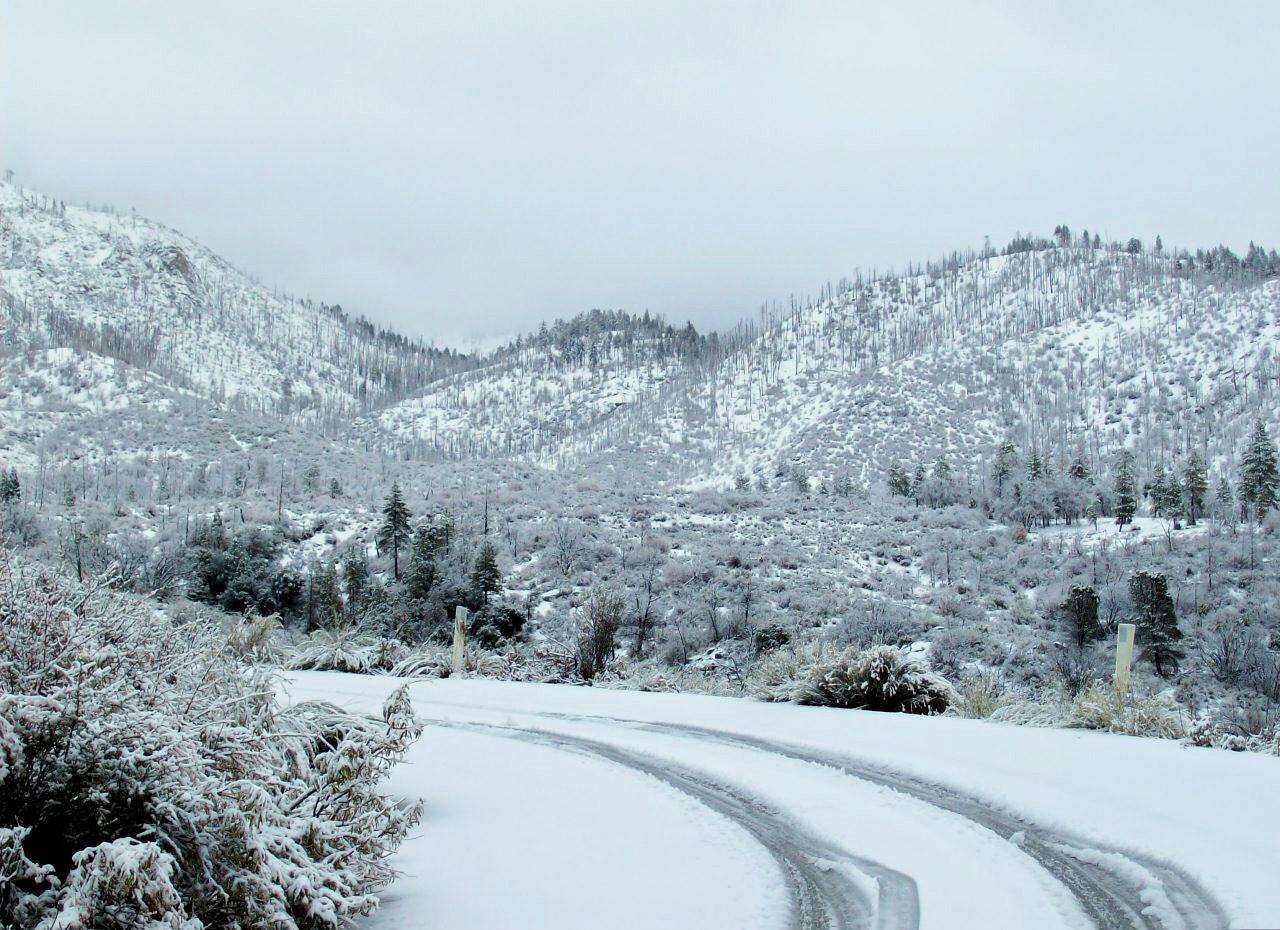
Snow in the mountains of Southern California

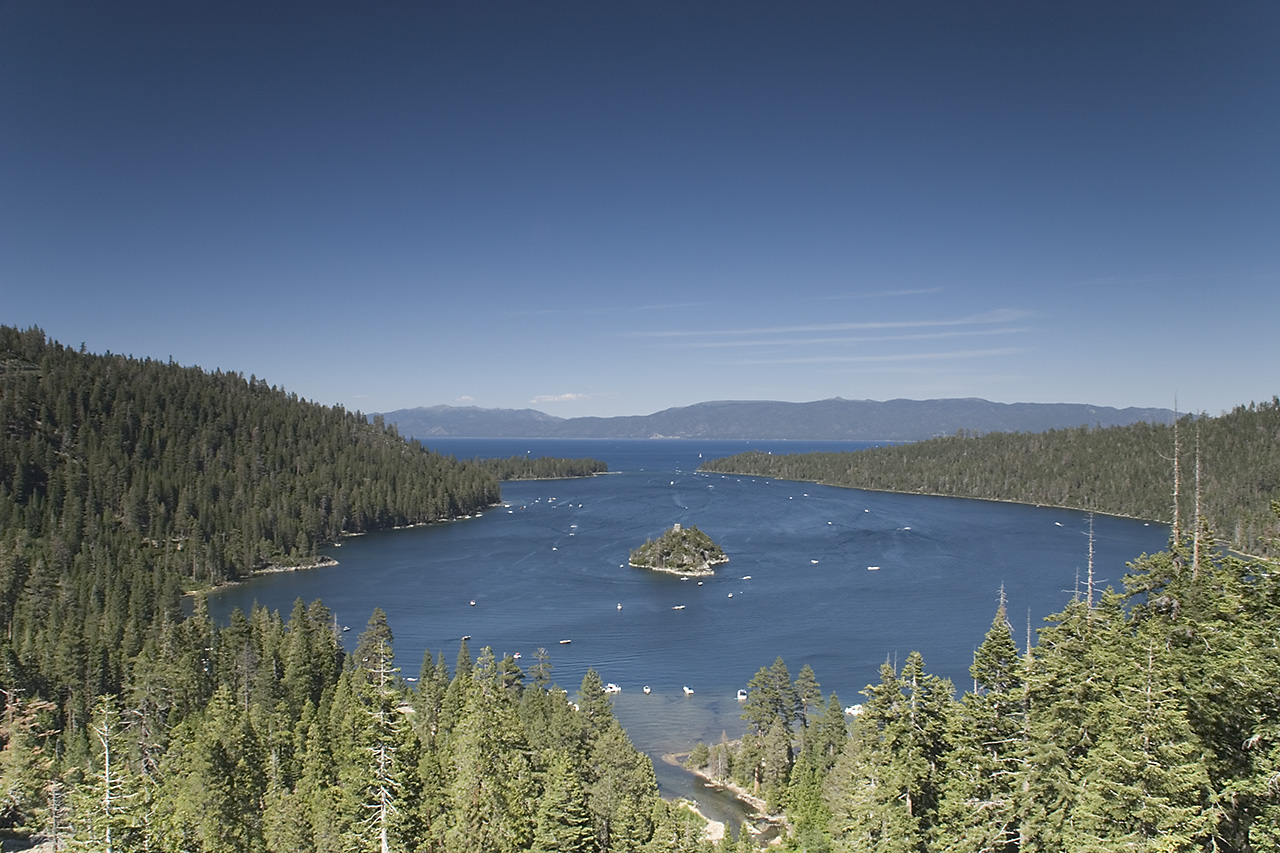
Summer in the Sierra Nevada at Lake Tahoe

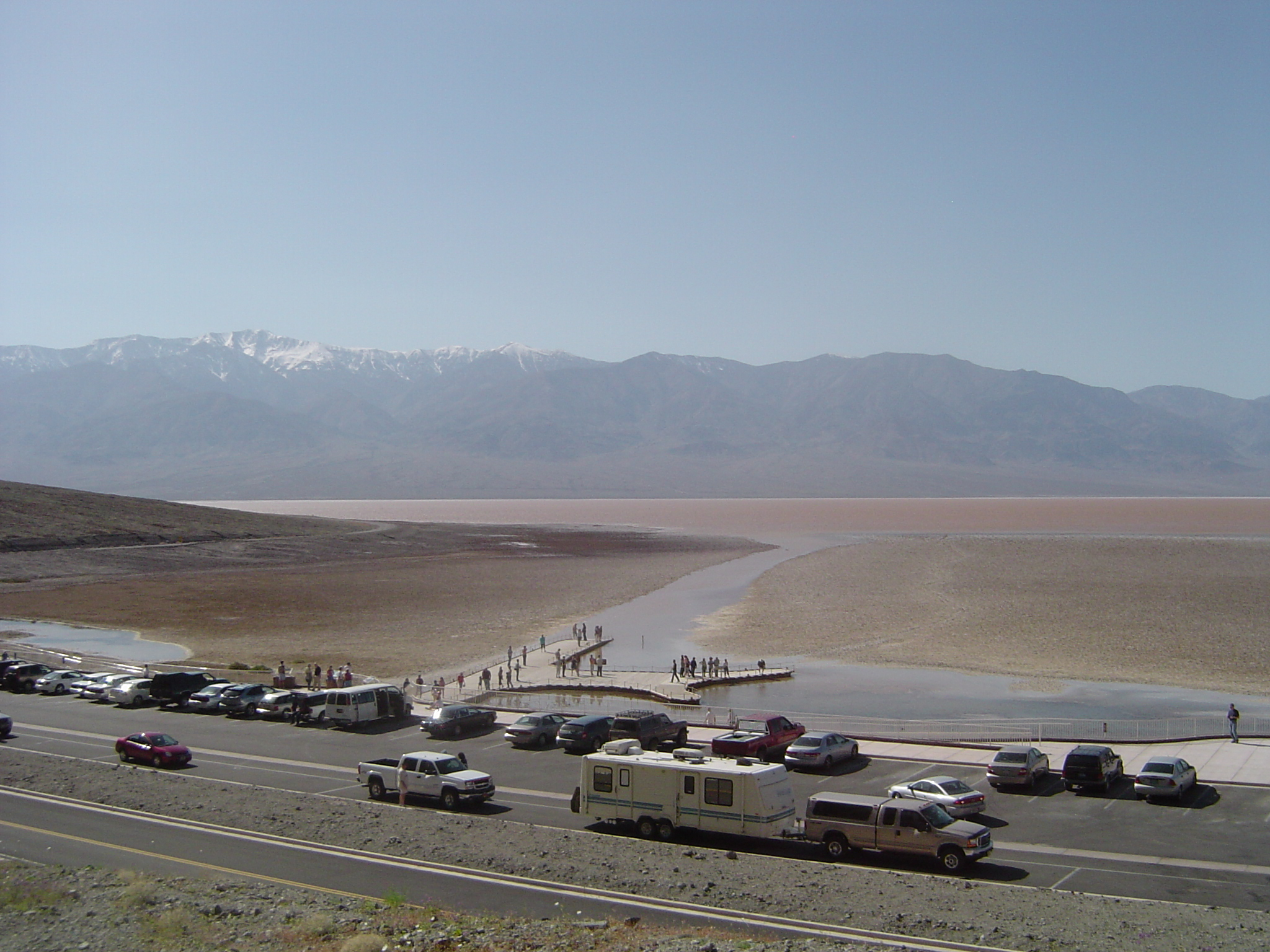
High precipitation in 2005 caused an ephemeral lake in the Badwater Basin of Death Valley.

The climate of California varies widely from hot desert to alpine tundra, depending on latitude, elevation, and proximity to the Pacific Coast. California's coastal regions, the Sierra Nevada foothills, and much of the Central Valley have a Mediterranean climate, with warmer, drier weather in summer and cooler, wetter weather in winter. The influence of the ocean generally moderates temperature extremes, creating warmer winters and substantially cooler summers in coastal areas.

== Temperature range ==
Snow on the ground in San Bernardino, Shandin Hills visible in the background

The cool offshore, enhanced by upwelling of cold sub-surface waters, often creates summer fog near the coast, creating a warm-summer Mediterranean climate (Köppen climate classification Csb). Farther inland, the climate becomes more continental, with some areas turning semi-arid (Köppen BSk), with colder winters and markedly hotter summers. Low-lying inland valleys, especially the Central Valley, have a hot-summer Mediterranean climate (Köppen Csa), with subtropical temperatures but a well-defined sunny summer and a foggy winter.

The temperature gradient between immediate coast and low-lying inland valleys in the south is about 7 °F or 3.9 °C in winter, the coast being warmer, and in summer roughly 20 °F or 11.1 °C, the interior being hotter. For example, the average daily high in San Francisco in July and August is between 62 and 68 °F (17 and 20 °C), and in Walnut Creek, some 20 miles (32 km) inland, the average daily high in July and August is 84 °F (28.9 °C): a temperature gain of more than one degree (Fahrenheit) per mile. In Southern California, the temperature differences are approximately 4 °F or 2.2 °C in winter and 23 °F or 12.8 °C in summer. At the coast in Santa Monica, the average high in August is 75 °F (24 °C), while in Burbank, approximately 10 miles (16 km) inland, the average high in August is 95 °F (35 °C): a temperature gain of about two degrees Fahrenheit per mile.

During the cooler winter months (October–March), the Coachella Valley regularly has the warmest winter temperatures out of any place west of the Rocky Mountains. East Los Angeles, the Gateway Cities, and parts of the San Gabriel Valley average the warmest winter high temps (72 °F, 22 °C) in all of the western U.S., and Santa Monica averages the warmest winter lows (52 °F, 11 °C) in all of the western U.S. Palm Springs, a city in the Coachella Valley, averages high/low/mean temperatures of 75 °F/50 °F/63 °F, (24 °C/10 °C/17 °C) respectively during the period of cooler weather from November to April. The extreme southwest, around San Diego, has a borderline mediterranean/semi-arid or steppe climate (Köppen "Csa"/"BSk") as winters are drier there.

The southeastern regions have a hot arid climate (Köppen BWh), similar to that of the Sahara Desert. In the northern portion of the Mojave Desert on the east side of the state is Death Valley, which has recorded temperatures among the highest in the world. It is common in the summer for temperatures in the valley to surpass 120 °F (49 °C). The highest reliably recorded temperature in the world, (Note: The 136.4 °F or 58 °C, claimed by 'Aziziya, Libya, on September 13, 1922, has been officially deemed invalid by the World Meteorological Organization.) 134 °F (56.7 °C), was recorded in Death Valley on July 10, 1913. Temperatures of 130 °F (54.4 °C) or higher have been recorded as recently as 2005. The 24-hour average July temperature in Death Valley is 101.8 °F (38.8 °C). (Note: 1981–2010 NCDC Normals)

In contrast, the high Sierra Nevada has a much cooler climate with extreme diurnal temperature variation. Bodie, at an altitude of 8,379 feet or 2,554 meters, has never had a freeze-free month in a record dating back to 1895, and can expect only about 60 minima above freezing annually.

The highest temperature ever recorded in California was 134 °F (56.7 °C) in Death Valley on July 10, 1913. This is also the highest temperature ever recorded on Earth. The lowest was −45 °F (−42.8 °C) in Boca on January 20, 1937.

Map of locations in the table below

Average daily high and low temperatures in °F (°C) for locations in California, colored and sortable by average monthly temperature
Place	Jan	Feb	Mar	Apr	May	Jun	Jul	Aug	Sep	Oct	Nov	Dec
Alturas	44 / 18 (7 / −8)	48 / 21 (9 / −6)	54 / 25 (12 / −4)	60 / 28 (16 / −2)	70 / 34 (21 / 1)	79 / 40 (26 / 4)	90 / 44 (32 / 7)	89 / 42 (32 / 6)	80 / 36 (27 / 2)	68 / 28 (20 / −2)	52 / 23 (11 / −5)	42 / 18 (6 / −8)
Bakersfield	56 / 39 (13 / 4)	63 / 42 (17 / 6)	69 / 47 (21 / 8)	75 / 50 (24 / 10)	84 / 58 (29 / 14)	91 / 64 (33 / 18)	97 / 71 (36 / 22)	96 / 69 (36 / 21)	90 / 64 (32 / 18)	80 / 55 (27 / 13)	66 / 45 (19 / 7)	57 / 39 (14 / 4)
Bishop	54 / 23 (12 / −5)	58 / 27 (14 / −3)	66 / 31 (19 / −1)	73 / 36 (23 / 2)	82 / 44 (28 / 7)	92 / 51 (33 / 11)	98 / 56 (37 / 13)	96 / 54 (36 / 12)	88 / 47 (31 / 8)	76 / 37 (24 / 3)	63 / 28 (17 / −2)	53 / 22 (12 / −6)
Bodie	40 / 5 (4 / −15)	41 / 7 (5 / −14)	45 / 11 (7 / −12)	50 / 17 (10 / −8)	61 / 24 (16 / −4)	70 / 30 (21 / −1)	78 / 34 (26 / 1)	77 / 32 (25 / 0)	71 / 26 (22 / −3)	60 / 18 (16 / −8)	49 / 11 (9 / −12)	41 / 6 (5 / −14)
Death Valley	67 / 40 (19 / 4)	73 / 46 (23 / 8)	82 / 55 (28 / 13)	91 / 62 (33 / 17)	101 / 73 (38 / 23)	110 / 81 (43 / 27)	117 / 88 (47 / 31)	115 / 86 (46 / 30)	107 / 76 (42 / 24)	93 / 62 (34 / 17)	77 / 48 (25 / 9)	65 / 38 (18 / 3)
Eureka	56 / 41 (13 / 5)	56 / 42 (13 / 6)	57 / 43 (14 / 6)	58 / 44 (14 / 7)	60 / 48 (16 / 9)	62 / 50 (17 / 10)	63 / 52 (17 / 11)	64 / 53 (18 / 12)	64 / 50 (18 / 10)	62 / 47 (17 / 8)	58 / 44 (14 / 7)	55 / 41 (13 / 5)
Fresno	55 / 38 (13 / 3)	62 / 42 (17 / 6)	68 / 46 (20 / 8)	75 / 49 (24 / 9)	84 / 56 (29 / 13)	92 / 62 (33 / 17)	98 / 68 (37 / 20)	97 / 66 (36 / 19)	91 / 62 (33 / 17)	80 / 53 (27 / 12)	65 / 43 (18 / 6)	55 / 38 (13 / 3)
Los Angeles	68 / 48 (20 / 9)	69 / 49 (21 / 9)	70 / 51 (21 / 11)	73 / 54 (23 / 12)	75 / 57 (24 / 14)	78 / 60 (26 / 16)	83 / 64 (28 / 18)	84 / 64 (29 / 18)	83 / 63 (28 / 17)	79 / 59 (26 / 15)	73 / 52 (23 / 11)	68 / 48 (20 / 9)
Needles	65 / 44 (18 / 7)	70 / 47 (21 / 8)	77 / 52 (25 / 11)	85 / 59 (29 / 15)	95 / 68 (35 / 20)	104 / 77 (40 / 25)	109 / 84 (43 / 29)	107 / 83 (42 / 28)	100 / 75 (38 / 24)	88 / 62 (31 / 17)	73 / 50 (23 / 10)	63 / 43 (17 / 6)
Redding	55 / 37 (13 / 3)	60 / 39 (16 / 4)	65 / 43 (18 / 6)	71 / 46 (22 / 8)	81 / 54 (27 / 12)	90 / 61 (32 / 16)	98 / 66 (37 / 19)	97 / 63 (36 / 17)	90 / 58 (32 / 14)	78 / 50 (26 / 10)	63 / 41 (17 / 5)	55 / 36 (13 / 2)
Riverside	69 / 43 (21 / 6)	70 / 45 (21 / 7)	73 / 46 (23 / 8)	78 / 50 (26 / 10)	83 / 55 (28 / 13)	89 / 60 (32 / 16)	95 / 64 (35 / 18)	96 / 65 (36 / 18)	92 / 61 (33 / 16)	83 / 55 (28 / 13)	75 / 47 (24 / 8)	68 / 42 (20 / 6)
Sacramento	54 / 39 (12 / 4)	60 / 41 (16 / 5)	65 / 44 (18 / 7)	71 / 46 (22 / 8)	80 / 51 (27 / 11)	87 / 56 (31 / 13)	92 / 58 (33 / 14)	91 / 58 (33 / 14)	87 / 56 (31 / 13)	78 / 50 (26 / 10)	64 / 43 (18 / 6)	54 / 38 (12 / 3)
San Diego	65 / 49 (18 / 9)	65 / 51 (18 / 11)	67 / 53 (19 / 12)	68 / 56 (20 / 13)	69 / 59 (21 / 15)	71 / 62 (22 / 17)	75 / 65 (24 / 18)	76 / 67 (24 / 19)	76 / 65 (24 / 18)	73 / 61 (23 / 16)	69 / 54 (21 / 12)	65 / 48 (18 / 9)
San Francisco	57 / 46 (14 / 8)	60 / 48 (16 / 9)	62 / 49 (17 / 9)	63 / 49 (17 / 9)	64 / 51 (18 / 11)	66 / 53 (19 / 12)	66 / 54 (19 / 12)	68 / 55 (20 / 13)	70 / 55 (21 / 13)	69 / 54 (21 / 12)	63 / 50 (17 / 10)	57 / 46 (14 / 8)
San Jose	58 / 42 (14 / 6)	62 / 45 (17 / 7)	66 / 47 (19 / 8)	69 / 49 (21 / 9)	74 / 52 (23 / 11)	79 / 56 (26 / 13)	82 / 58 (28 / 14)	82 / 58 (28 / 14)	80 / 57 (27 / 14)	74 / 53 (23 / 12)	64 / 46 (18 / 8)	58 / 42 (14 / 6)
Santa Rosa	59 / 39 (15 / 4)	63 / 41 (17 / 5)	67 / 43 (19 / 6)	70 / 45 (21 / 7)	75 / 48 (24 / 9)	80 / 52 (27 / 11)	82 / 52 (28 / 11)	83 / 53 (28 / 12)	83 / 52 (28 / 11)	78 / 48 (26 / 9)	67 / 43 (19 / 6)	59 / 39 (15 / 4)
South Lake Tahoe	43 / 16 (6 / −9)	44 / 18 (7 / −8)	49 / 23 (9 / −5)	54 / 27 (12 / −3)	64 / 32 (18 / 0)	72 / 37 (22 / 3)	81 / 41 (27 / 5)	80 / 40 (27 / 4)	74 / 35 (23 / 2)	63 / 28 (17 / −2)	51 / 22 (11 / −6)	43 / 17 (6 / −8)

=== Full statistics for selected cities ===
Climate data for Fresno, California (Fresno Airport), 1991–2020 normals, (Note: Mean maxima and minima (i.e., the highest and lowest temperature readings during an entire month or year) calculated based on data at said location from 1991 to 2020.) extremes 1881–present (Note: Official records for Fresno kept September 1881 to 15 August 1887 at downtown, 16 August 1887 to June 1939 at Fresno City Offices, July 1939 to 20 August 1949 at Chandler Field, and at Fresno Yosemite Int'l since 21 August 1949. For more information, see Threadex)
Month	Jan	Feb	Mar	Apr	May	Jun	Jul	Aug	Sep	Oct	Nov	Dec	Year
Record high °F (°C)	78 (26)	84 (29)	93 (34)	101 (38)	110 (43)	112 (44)	115 (46)	113 (45)	114 (46)	105 (41)	90 (32)	77 (25)	115 (46)
Mean maximum °F (°C)	68.1 (20.1)	73.7 (23.2)	81.9 (27.7)	90.8 (32.7)	99.0 (37.2)	105.9 (41.1)	107.7 (42.1)	107.1 (41.7)	103.1 (39.5)	93.2 (34.0)	79.6 (26.4)	67.4 (19.7)	109.2 (42.9)
Mean daily maximum °F (°C)	55.4 (13.0)	61.3 (16.3)	67.5 (19.7)	73.7 (23.2)	82.7 (28.2)	91.4 (33.0)	97.7 (36.5)	96.5 (35.8)	90.7 (32.6)	78.7 (25.9)	64.9 (18.3)	55.3 (12.9)	76.3 (24.6)
Daily mean °F (°C)	48.0 (8.9)	52.3 (11.3)	57.4 (14.1)	62.3 (16.8)	70.2 (21.2)	77.6 (25.3)	83.5 (28.6)	82.2 (27.9)	77.1 (25.1)	66.7 (19.3)	55.1 (12.8)	47.5 (8.6)	65.0 (18.3)
Mean daily minimum °F (°C)	40.6 (4.8)	43.3 (6.3)	47.3 (8.5)	50.9 (10.5)	57.6 (14.2)	63.9 (17.7)	69.3 (20.7)	67.9 (19.9)	63.4 (17.4)	54.6 (12.6)	45.4 (7.4)	39.8 (4.3)	53.7 (12.1)
Mean minimum °F (°C)	30.5 (−0.8)	33.4 (0.8)	37.2 (2.9)	40.4 (4.7)	47.7 (8.7)	52.9 (11.6)	60.1 (15.6)	59.7 (15.4)	53.8 (12.1)	44.6 (7.0)	34.7 (1.5)	30.2 (−1.0)	28.8 (−1.8)
Record low °F (°C)	17 (−8)	24 (−4)	26 (−3)	32 (0)	36 (2)	42 (6)	50 (10)	49 (9)	37 (3)	27 (−3)	26 (−3)	18 (−8)	17 (−8)
Average precipitation inches (mm)	2.16 (55)	1.93 (49)	1.90 (48)	1.04 (26)	0.42 (11)	0.24 (6.1)	0.03 (0.76)	0.00 (0.00)	0.05 (1.3)	0.56 (14)	0.87 (22)	1.79 (45)	10.99 (279)
Average precipitation days (≥ 0.01 in)	7.7	8.5	7.2	4.5	2.7	0.7	0.3	0.1	0.6	2.2	4.7	7.3	46.5
Average relative humidity (%)	83.3	77.2	68.9	57.4	47.3	41.9	39.2	44.7	50.0	58.5	74.1	84.2	60.6
Average dew point °F (°C)	39.4 (4.1)	42.4 (5.8)	43.2 (6.2)	43.2 (6.2)	45.3 (7.4)	48.9 (9.4)	52.3 (11.3)	54.1 (12.3)	51.6 (10.9)	47.3 (8.5)	43.2 (6.2)	39.6 (4.2)	45.9 (7.7)
Mean monthly sunshine hours	141.5	196.9	286.2	335.5	398.9	412.2	428.2	399.6	345.9	302.3	189.9	127.1	3,564.2
Percentage possible sunshine	46	65	77	85	91	94	96	95	93	87	62	42	80
Source: NOAA (relative humidity, dew points and sun 1961–1990)

Climate data for Los Angeles (Dodger Stadium, Downtown), 1991–2020 normals, extremes 1877–present
Month	Jan	Feb	Mar	Apr	May	Jun	Jul	Aug	Sep	Oct	Nov	Dec	Year
Record high °F (°C)	95 (35)	95 (35)	99 (37)	106 (41)	103 (39)	112 (44)	109 (43)	106 (41)	113 (45)	108 (42)	100 (38)	92 (33)	113 (45)
Mean maximum °F (°C)	83.0 (28.3)	82.8 (28.2)	85.8 (29.9)	90.1 (32.3)	88.9 (31.6)	89.1 (31.7)	93.5 (34.2)	95.2 (35.1)	99.4 (37.4)	95.7 (35.4)	88.9 (31.6)	81.0 (27.2)	101.5 (38.6)
Mean daily maximum °F (°C)	68.0 (20.0)	68.0 (20.0)	69.9 (21.1)	72.4 (22.4)	73.7 (23.2)	77.2 (25.1)	82.0 (27.8)	84.0 (28.9)	83.0 (28.3)	78.6 (25.9)	72.9 (22.7)	67.4 (19.7)	74.8 (23.8)
Daily mean °F (°C)	58.4 (14.7)	59.0 (15.0)	61.1 (16.2)	63.6 (17.6)	65.9 (18.8)	69.3 (20.7)	73.3 (22.9)	74.7 (23.7)	73.6 (23.1)	69.3 (20.7)	63.0 (17.2)	57.8 (14.3)	65.8 (18.8)
Mean daily minimum °F (°C)	48.9 (9.4)	50.0 (10.0)	52.4 (11.3)	54.8 (12.7)	58.1 (14.5)	61.4 (16.3)	64.7 (18.2)	65.4 (18.6)	64.2 (17.9)	59.9 (15.5)	53.1 (11.7)	48.2 (9.0)	56.8 (13.8)
Mean minimum °F (°C)	41.4 (5.2)	42.9 (6.1)	45.4 (7.4)	48.9 (9.4)	53.5 (11.9)	57.4 (14.1)	61.1 (16.2)	61.7 (16.5)	59.1 (15.1)	53.7 (12.1)	45.4 (7.4)	40.5 (4.7)	39.2 (4.0)
Record low °F (°C)	28 (−2)	28 (−2)	31 (−1)	36 (2)	40 (4)	46 (8)	49 (9)	49 (9)	44 (7)	40 (4)	34 (1)	30 (−1)	28 (−2)
Average precipitation inches (mm)	3.29 (84)	3.64 (92)	2.23 (57)	0.69 (18)	0.32 (8.1)	0.09 (2.3)	0.02 (0.51)	0.00 (0.00)	0.13 (3.3)	0.58 (15)	0.78 (20)	2.48 (63)	14.25 (362)
Average precipitation days (≥ 0.01 in)	6.1	6.3	5.1	2.8	1.9	0.5	0.4	0.1	0.4	2.2	2.8	5.5	34.1
Mean monthly sunshine hours	225.3	222.5	267.0	303.5	276.2	275.8	364.1	349.5	278.5	255.1	217.3	219.4	3,254.2
Percentage possible sunshine	71	72	72	78	64	64	83	84	75	73	70	71	73
Average ultraviolet index	2.9	4.2	6.2	8.1	9.2	10.4	10.8	10.0	8.1	5.4	3.5	2.6	6.7
Source 1: NOAA (sun 1961–1977)
Source 2: UV Index Today (1995 to 2022)

Climate data for Los Angeles (LAX), 1991–2020 normals, extremes 1944–present
Month	Jan	Feb	Mar	Apr	May	Jun	Jul	Aug	Sep	Oct	Nov	Dec	Year
Record high °F (°C)	91 (33)	92 (33)	95 (35)	102 (39)	97 (36)	104 (40)	97 (36)	98 (37)	110 (43)	106 (41)	101 (38)	94 (34)	110 (43)
Mean maximum °F (°C)	81.2 (27.3)	80.1 (26.7)	80.6 (27.0)	83.1 (28.4)	80.6 (27.0)	79.8 (26.6)	83.7 (28.7)	86.0 (30.0)	90.7 (32.6)	90.9 (32.7)	87.2 (30.7)	78.8 (26.0)	95.5 (35.3)
Mean daily maximum °F (°C)	66.3 (19.1)	65.6 (18.7)	66.1 (18.9)	68.1 (20.1)	69.5 (20.8)	72.0 (22.2)	75.1 (23.9)	76.7 (24.8)	76.5 (24.7)	74.4 (23.6)	70.9 (21.6)	66.1 (18.9)	70.6 (21.4)
Daily mean °F (°C)	57.9 (14.4)	57.9 (14.4)	59.1 (15.1)	61.1 (16.2)	63.6 (17.6)	66.4 (19.1)	69.6 (20.9)	70.7 (21.5)	70.1 (21.2)	67.1 (19.5)	62.3 (16.8)	57.6 (14.2)	63.6 (17.6)
Mean daily minimum °F (°C)	49.4 (9.7)	50.1 (10.1)	52.2 (11.2)	54.2 (12.3)	57.6 (14.2)	60.9 (16.1)	64.0 (17.8)	64.8 (18.2)	63.7 (17.6)	59.8 (15.4)	53.7 (12.1)	49.1 (9.5)	56.6 (13.7)
Mean minimum °F (°C)	41.8 (5.4)	42.9 (6.1)	45.3 (7.4)	48.0 (8.9)	52.7 (11.5)	56.7 (13.7)	60.2 (15.7)	61.0 (16.1)	58.7 (14.8)	53.2 (11.8)	46.1 (7.8)	41.1 (5.1)	39.4 (4.1)
Record low °F (°C)	27 (−3)	34 (1)	35 (2)	42 (6)	45 (7)	48 (9)	52 (11)	51 (11)	47 (8)	43 (6)	38 (3)	32 (0)	27 (−3)
Average precipitation inches (mm)	2.86 (73)	2.99 (76)	1.73 (44)	0.60 (15)	0.28 (7.1)	0.08 (2.0)	0.04 (1.0)	0.00 (0.00)	0.11 (2.8)	0.49 (12)	0.82 (21)	2.23 (57)	12.23 (311)
Average precipitation days (≥ 0.01 in)	6.1	6.3	5.6	2.6	1.7	0.5	0.5	0.1	0.5	2.0	3.2	5.4	34.5
Average relative humidity (%)	63.4	67.9	70.5	71.0	74.0	75.9	76.6	76.6	74.2	70.5	65.5	62.9	70.8
Average dew point °F (°C)	41.4 (5.2)	44.4 (6.9)	46.6 (8.1)	49.1 (9.5)	52.7 (11.5)	56.5 (13.6)	60.1 (15.6)	61.2 (16.2)	59.2 (15.1)	54.1 (12.3)	46.8 (8.2)	41.4 (5.2)	51.1 (10.6)
Mean monthly sunshine hours	201.3	205.2	273.5	294.9	343.6	345.0	362.4	337.8	290.9	259.0	219.1	190.6	3,323.3
Source 1: NOAA (relative humidity and dew point 1961–1990)
Source 2: Weather.Directory

Climate data for Sacramento, California (Sacramento Executive Airport), 1991–2020 normals, extremes 1941–present (Note: Official records for Sacramento were kept exclusively at the airport since 10 November 1941.)
Month	Jan	Feb	Mar	Apr	May	Jun	Jul	Aug	Sep	Oct	Nov	Dec	Year
Record high °F (°C)	76 (24)	78 (26)	88 (31)	95 (35)	105 (41)	115 (46)	114 (46)	112 (44)	114 (46)	104 (40)	87 (31)	74 (23)	115 (46)
Mean maximum °F (°C)	65.2 (18.4)	71.1 (21.7)	78.1 (25.6)	87.4 (30.8)	95.3 (35.2)	103.1 (39.5)	105.3 (40.7)	104.1 (40.1)	100.6 (38.1)	91.8 (33.2)	76.5 (24.7)	65.1 (18.4)	107.0 (41.7)
Mean daily maximum °F (°C)	56.0 (13.3)	61.3 (16.3)	66.3 (19.1)	72.1 (22.3)	80.3 (26.8)	87.9 (31.1)	92.6 (33.7)	91.9 (33.3)	88.5 (31.4)	78.8 (26.0)	65.0 (18.3)	56.0 (13.3)	74.7 (23.7)
Daily mean °F (°C)	47.6 (8.7)	51.4 (10.8)	55.4 (13.0)	59.5 (15.3)	66.1 (18.9)	72.2 (22.3)	75.9 (24.4)	75.3 (24.1)	72.5 (22.5)	64.5 (18.1)	53.9 (12.2)	47.3 (8.5)	61.8 (16.6)
Mean daily minimum °F (°C)	39.2 (4.0)	41.5 (5.3)	44.5 (6.9)	47.0 (8.3)	52.0 (11.1)	56.5 (13.6)	59.2 (15.1)	58.8 (14.9)	56.5 (13.6)	50.3 (10.2)	42.7 (5.9)	38.5 (3.6)	48.9 (9.4)
Mean minimum °F (°C)	29.1 (−1.6)	31.7 (−0.2)	35.1 (1.7)	37.9 (3.3)	44.1 (6.7)	49.5 (9.7)	54.1 (12.3)	53.8 (12.1)	49.6 (9.8)	41.7 (5.4)	32.7 (0.4)	28.7 (−1.8)	26.9 (−2.8)
Record low °F (°C)	20 (−7)	23 (−5)	26 (−3)	31 (−1)	34 (1)	41 (5)	48 (9)	48 (9)	42 (6)	35 (2)	26 (−3)	18 (−8)	18 (−8)
Average precipitation inches (mm)	3.66 (93)	3.49 (89)	2.68 (68)	1.26 (32)	0.75 (19)	0.23 (5.8)	0.00 (0.00)	0.04 (1.0)	0.09 (2.3)	0.85 (22)	1.66 (42)	3.43 (87)	18.14 (461)
Average precipitation days (≥ 0.01 in)	10.0	9.1	9.0	5.1	3.6	1.1	0.1	0.2	0.7	3.1	6.1	9.6	57.7
Average relative humidity (%)	83.3	76.8	71.6	64.5	58.9	55.0	53.2	55.7	57.0	63.1	75.6	82.9	66.5
Average dew point °F (°C)	39.4 (4.1)	42.1 (5.6)	42.8 (6.0)	43.7 (6.5)	46.9 (8.3)	50.4 (10.2)	53.1 (11.7)	53.4 (11.9)	50.9 (10.5)	47.5 (8.6)	43.7 (6.5)	39.2 (4.0)	46.1 (7.8)
Mean monthly sunshine hours	145.5	201.3	278.0	329.6	406.3	419.5	440.2	406.9	347.8	296.7	194.9	141.1	3,607.8
Percentage possible sunshine	48	67	75	83	92	94	98	96	93	86	64	48	81
Source: NOAA (relative humidity, dew point and sun 1961–1990)

Climate data for Sacramento 5 ESE, California (Sacramento State), 1991–2020 normals, extremes 1877–present
Month	Jan	Feb	Mar	Apr	May	Jun	Jul	Aug	Sep	Oct	Nov	Dec	Year
Record high °F (°C)	79 (26)	80 (27)	90 (32)	98 (37)	107 (42)	112 (44)	114 (46)	112 (44)	116 (47)	102 (39)	86 (30)	72 (22)	116 (47)
Mean maximum °F (°C)	66.4 (19.1)	72.5 (22.5)	80.6 (27.0)	89.5 (31.9)	97.1 (36.2)	104.4 (40.2)	106.7 (41.5)	105.5 (40.8)	102.0 (38.9)	92.3 (33.5)	77.3 (25.2)	65.9 (18.8)	108.1 (42.3)
Mean daily maximum °F (°C)	56.5 (13.6)	62.2 (16.8)	67.8 (19.9)	73.5 (23.1)	81.3 (27.4)	89.0 (31.7)	94.4 (34.7)	93.5 (34.2)	89.3 (31.8)	78.9 (26.1)	65.3 (18.5)	56.4 (13.6)	75.7 (24.3)
Daily mean °F (°C)	48.8 (9.3)	52.9 (11.6)	57.2 (14.0)	61.4 (16.3)	67.7 (19.8)	73.9 (23.3)	77.9 (25.5)	77.3 (25.2)	74.0 (23.3)	65.9 (18.8)	55.3 (12.9)	48.5 (9.2)	63.4 (17.4)
Mean daily minimum °F (°C)	41.1 (5.1)	43.7 (6.5)	46.7 (8.2)	49.3 (9.6)	54.0 (12.2)	58.7 (14.8)	61.4 (16.3)	61.0 (16.1)	58.8 (14.9)	52.9 (11.6)	45.3 (7.4)	40.7 (4.8)	51.1 (10.6)
Mean minimum °F (°C)	32.5 (0.3)	35.4 (1.9)	38.8 (3.8)	41.6 (5.3)	47.2 (8.4)	51.9 (11.1)	55.9 (13.3)	55.9 (13.3)	52.4 (11.3)	45.1 (7.3)	36.2 (2.3)	31.9 (−0.1)	30.5 (−0.8)
Record low °F (°C)	19 (−7)	21 (−6)	29 (−2)	34 (1)	37 (3)	43 (6)	47 (8)	48 (9)	44 (7)	34 (1)	27 (−3)	17 (−8)	17 (−8)
Average precipitation inches (mm)	3.87 (98)	3.63 (92)	2.82 (72)	1.44 (37)	0.86 (22)	0.21 (5.3)	0.00 (0.00)	0.02 (0.51)	0.15 (3.8)	0.93 (24)	1.78 (45)	3.49 (89)	19.20 (488)
Average precipitation days (≥ 0.01 in)	10.8	9.6	9.2	5.3	3.7	1.2	0.1	0.2	0.8	3.1	6.8	10.1	60.9
Source: NOAA, Western Regional Climate Center

Climate data for San Francisco (downtown), (Note: The coordinates of the station are 37.7706°N 122.4269°W. Precipitation, high temperature, low temperature, snow, and snow depth records date from October 1, 1849; June 1, 1874; January 1, 1875; January 1, 1876; and January 1, 1922; respectively.) 1991–2020 normals, (Note: Mean monthly maxima and minima (i.e. the expected highest and lowest temperature readings at any point during the year or given month) calculated based on data at said location from 1991 to 2020.) extremes 1849–present
Month	Jan	Feb	Mar	Apr	May	Jun	Jul	Aug	Sep	Oct	Nov	Dec	Year
Record high °F (°C)	79 (26)	81 (27)	90 (32)	94 (34)	97 (36)	103 (39)	99 (37)	98 (37)	106 (41)	102 (39)	86 (30)	76 (24)	106 (41)
Mean maximum °F (°C)	67.1 (19.5)	71.8 (22.1)	76.4 (24.7)	80.7 (27.1)	81.4 (27.4)	84.6 (29.2)	80.5 (26.9)	83.4 (28.6)	90.8 (32.7)	87.9 (31.1)	75.8 (24.3)	66.4 (19.1)	94.0 (34.4)
Mean daily maximum °F (°C)	57.8 (14.3)	60.4 (15.8)	62.1 (16.7)	63.0 (17.2)	64.1 (17.8)	66.5 (19.2)	66.3 (19.1)	67.9 (19.9)	70.2 (21.2)	69.8 (21.0)	63.7 (17.6)	57.9 (14.4)	64.1 (17.8)
Daily mean °F (°C)	52.2 (11.2)	54.2 (12.3)	55.5 (13.1)	56.4 (13.6)	57.8 (14.3)	59.7 (15.4)	60.3 (15.7)	61.7 (16.5)	62.9 (17.2)	62.1 (16.7)	57.2 (14.0)	52.5 (11.4)	57.7 (14.3)
Mean daily minimum °F (°C)	46.6 (8.1)	47.9 (8.8)	48.9 (9.4)	49.7 (9.8)	51.4 (10.8)	53.0 (11.7)	54.4 (12.4)	55.5 (13.1)	55.6 (13.1)	54.4 (12.4)	50.7 (10.4)	47.0 (8.3)	51.3 (10.7)
Mean minimum °F (°C)	39.5 (4.2)	41.0 (5.0)	43.7 (6.5)	45.0 (7.2)	48.0 (8.9)	50.1 (10.1)	51.6 (10.9)	52.9 (11.6)	52.0 (11.1)	49.9 (9.9)	44.9 (7.2)	37.4 (3.0)	37.4 (3.0)
Record low °F (°C)	29 (−2)	31 (−1)	33 (1)	40 (4)	42 (6)	46 (8)	47 (8)	46 (8)	47 (8)	43 (6)	38 (3)	27 (−3)	27 (−3)
Average precipitation inches (mm)	4.40 (112)	4.37 (111)	3.15 (80)	1.60 (41)	0.70 (18)	0.20 (5.1)	0.01 (0.25)	0.06 (1.5)	0.10 (2.5)	0.94 (24)	2.60 (66)	4.76 (121)	22.89 (581)
Average precipitation days (≥ 0.01 in)	11.2	10.8	10.8	6.8	4.0	1.6	0.7	1.1	1.2	3.5	7.9	11.6	71.2
Average relative humidity (%)	80	77	75	72	72	71	75	75	73	71	75	78	75
Mean monthly sunshine hours	185.9	207.7	269.1	309.3	325.1	311.4	313.3	287.4	271.4	247.1	173.4	160.6	3,061.7
Percentage possible sunshine	61	69	73	78	74	70	70	68	73	71	57	54	69
Average ultraviolet index	2	3	5	7	9	10	10	9	7	5	3	2	6
Source 1: NOAA (sun 1961–1974)
Source 2: Met Office (humidity), Weather Atlas (UV)

Climate data for San Diego Int'l Airport (1991–2020 normals, (Note: Mean monthly maxima and minima (i.e. the highest and lowest temperature readings during an entire month or year) calculated based on data at said location from 1991 to 2020.) extremes 1874–present) (Note: Official precipitation records for San Diego were kept at the Weather Bureau Office in downtown from October 1850 to December 1859 at the Mission San Diego and from November 1871 to June 1939 and a variety of buildings at downtown, and at San Diego Int'l (Lindbergh Field) since July 1939. Temperature records, however, only date from October 1874. For more information on data coverage, see ThreadEx)
Month	Jan	Feb	Mar	Apr	May	Jun	Jul	Aug	Sep	Oct	Nov	Dec	Year
Record high °F (°C)	88 (31)	91 (33)	99 (37)	98 (37)	98 (37)	101 (38)	100 (38)	98 (37)	111 (44)	107 (42)	100 (38)	88 (31)	111 (44)
Mean maximum °F (°C)	78.8 (26.0)	78.6 (25.9)	80.2 (26.8)	82.1 (27.8)	79.3 (26.3)	79.6 (26.4)	82.9 (28.3)	85.2 (29.6)	90.6 (32.6)	87.8 (31.0)	85.4 (29.7)	77.0 (25.0)	94.0 (34.4)
Mean daily maximum °F (°C)	66.4 (19.1)	66.2 (19.0)	67.0 (19.4)	68.8 (20.4)	69.5 (20.8)	71.7 (22.1)	75.3 (24.1)	77.3 (25.2)	77.2 (25.1)	74.6 (23.7)	70.7 (21.5)	66.0 (18.9)	70.9 (21.6)
Daily mean °F (°C)	58.4 (14.7)	59.0 (15.0)	60.7 (15.9)	62.9 (17.2)	64.8 (18.2)	67.2 (19.6)	70.7 (21.5)	72.4 (22.4)	71.7 (22.1)	68.1 (20.1)	62.7 (17.1)	57.9 (14.4)	64.7 (18.2)
Mean daily minimum °F (°C)	50.3 (10.2)	51.8 (11.0)	54.5 (12.5)	57.1 (13.9)	60.0 (15.6)	62.6 (17.0)	66.1 (18.9)	67.5 (19.7)	66.2 (19.0)	61.5 (16.4)	54.8 (12.7)	49.8 (9.9)	58.5 (14.7)
Mean minimum °F (°C)	43.7 (6.5)	46.1 (7.8)	48.7 (9.3)	51.9 (11.1)	55.8 (13.2)	59.3 (15.2)	63.0 (17.2)	63.9 (17.7)	61.8 (16.6)	55.5 (13.1)	48.2 (9.0)	43.0 (6.1)	42.6 (5.9)
Record low °F (°C)	25 (−4)	34 (1)	36 (2)	39 (4)	45 (7)	50 (10)	54 (12)	54 (12)	50 (10)	43 (6)	36 (2)	32 (0)	25 (−4)
Average precipitation inches (mm)	1.98 (50)	2.20 (56)	1.46 (37)	0.65 (17)	0.28 (7.1)	0.05 (1.3)	0.08 (2.0)	0.01 (0.25)	0.12 (3.0)	0.50 (13)	0.79 (20)	1.67 (42)	9.79 (249)
Average precipitation days (≥ 0.01 in)	6.5	7.1	6.2	3.8	2.2	0.7	0.7	0.3	0.9	2.4	3.7	5.8	40.3
Average relative humidity (%)	63.1	65.7	67.3	67.0	70.6	74.0	74.6	74.1	72.7	69.4	66.3	63.7	69.0
Average dew point °F (°C)	42.8 (6.0)	45.3 (7.4)	47.3 (8.5)	49.5 (9.7)	53.1 (11.7)	57.0 (13.9)	61.2 (16.2)	62.4 (16.9)	60.6 (15.9)	55.6 (13.1)	48.6 (9.2)	43.2 (6.2)	52.2 (11.2)
Mean monthly sunshine hours	239.3	227.4	261.0	276.2	250.5	242.4	304.7	295.0	253.3	243.4	230.1	231.3	3,054.6
Percentage possible sunshine	75	74	70	71	58	57	70	71	68	69	73	74	69
Source: NOAA (sun, relative humidity, and dew point 1961–1990)

== Precipitation ==
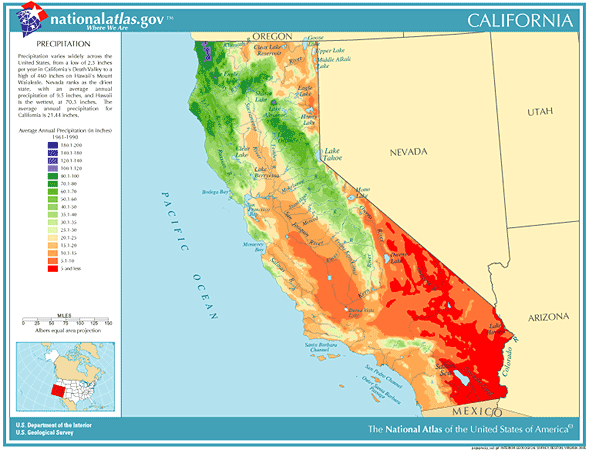
Average annual precipitation

Percent Area in U.S. Drought Monitor Categories

The prevailing westerly winds from the oceans also bring moisture, and the northern parts of the state generally receive higher annual rainfall amounts than the south. California's mountain ranges influence the climate as well: moisture-laden air from the west cools as it ascends the mountains, dropping moisture; some of the rainiest parts of the state are west-facing mountain slopes. Northwestern California has a temperate climate with rainfall of 15 inches (380 mm) to 50 inches (1,300 mm) per year. Some areas of Coast Redwood forest receive over 100 inches (2,500 mm) of precipitation per year.

The Central Valley has a wide range of precipitation. The northern parts of the Central Valley receive substantially greater precipitation from winter storms which sweep down from the Pacific Northwest, while the southernmost regions of the Central Valley are near desert-like because of a lack of precipitation.

The high mountains, including the Sierra Nevada, the Cascade Range, and the Klamath Mountains, have a mountain climate with snow in winter and mild to moderate heat in summer. Ski resorts at Lake Tahoe, Mammoth Lakes, and Mount Shasta routinely receive over 10 feet (3.0 m) of snow in a season, and some years, substantially more – leading, for example, to annual ski races on the Fourth of July.

On the east side of the mountains is a drier rain shadow. California's desert climate regions lie east of the high Sierra Nevada and southern California's Transverse Ranges and Peninsular Ranges. The low deserts east of the southern California mountains, including the Imperial and Coachella valleys and the lower Colorado River, are part of the Sonoran Desert, with minimal frost in the winter; the higher elevation deserts of eastern California, including the Mojave Desert, Owens Valley, and the Modoc Plateau, are part of the Great Basin region, which has a more continental climate. During the summer months, especially from July through early September, the region is affected by the Mexican Monsoon (also called the "southwest monsoon"), which drives moisture from the tropical Pacific, Gulf of California, and/or Gulf of Mexico into the deserts, setting off brief, but often torrential thunderstorms, particularly over mountainous terrain.

The ENSO cycle has a huge effect on rainfall and snowfall patterns in California, especially during the winter and spring seasons. During the El Niño phase, the jet stream is located south through California, allowing for warmer temperatures and more heavy rains to occur, particularly in the southern portions of the state. During the La Niña phase, the jet stream is much further north, and therefore the far northern portions of California are wetter, while the southern half stays cool and dry.

=== Fog ===
Incidences of dense fog in Los Angeles have been decreasing over time; researchers surmise the change may be a consequence of both the urban heat Island effect and decreased air pollution.

In the Central Valley during the winter months and in times of clear skies and light winds, the moisture from the Pacific can produce the tule fog, which is exceptionally thick fog that is visible on satellite imagery. The tule fog, named after the local tule grass wetlands, can reduce visibility to near zero, making it the primary cause of weather-related traffic accidents in the state. On November 3, 2007, a sudden patch of dense fog along California State Route 99 (SR 99) resulted in a traffic crash involving 108 vehicles in Fresno, which killed two people and at least 36 injuries. Following the accident, the California Department of Transportation (Caltrans) developed a fog warning system along a 13 mi (21 km) section of SR 99.

=== Tornadoes ===
Across the state, tornadoes develop in three main regions – the Los Angeles area, the deserts of Southern California, the Central Valley. However, they are typically weaker and shorter-lived than tornadoes in the central United States. Because of their irregular and short-lived nature, the San Diego National Weather Service considers it "nearly impossible to forecast a Southern California tornado before it touches down." The agency utilizes a volunteer group of more than 1,300 volunteers to report local severe weather. The most California tornadoes on a single day in the state was seven, which occurred on November 9, 1982. In July 2004, a twister touched down in Sequoia National Park at an altitude of around 12,156 ft (3,705 m), making it the highest elevation for a confirmed tornado in the United States.

=== Tropical cyclones ===
Despite its long coastline, California is not vulnerable to tropical cyclones. Because of the cold California Current from the North Pacific Ocean and the fact that the storms tend to "steer" west, California has only been hit with three tropical storms in recorded history, a storm which came ashore in 1939 and dumped heavy rainfall on the Los Angeles area and interior deserts. The remnants of tropical systems will affect California more commonly, every several years.

== Wildfires ==
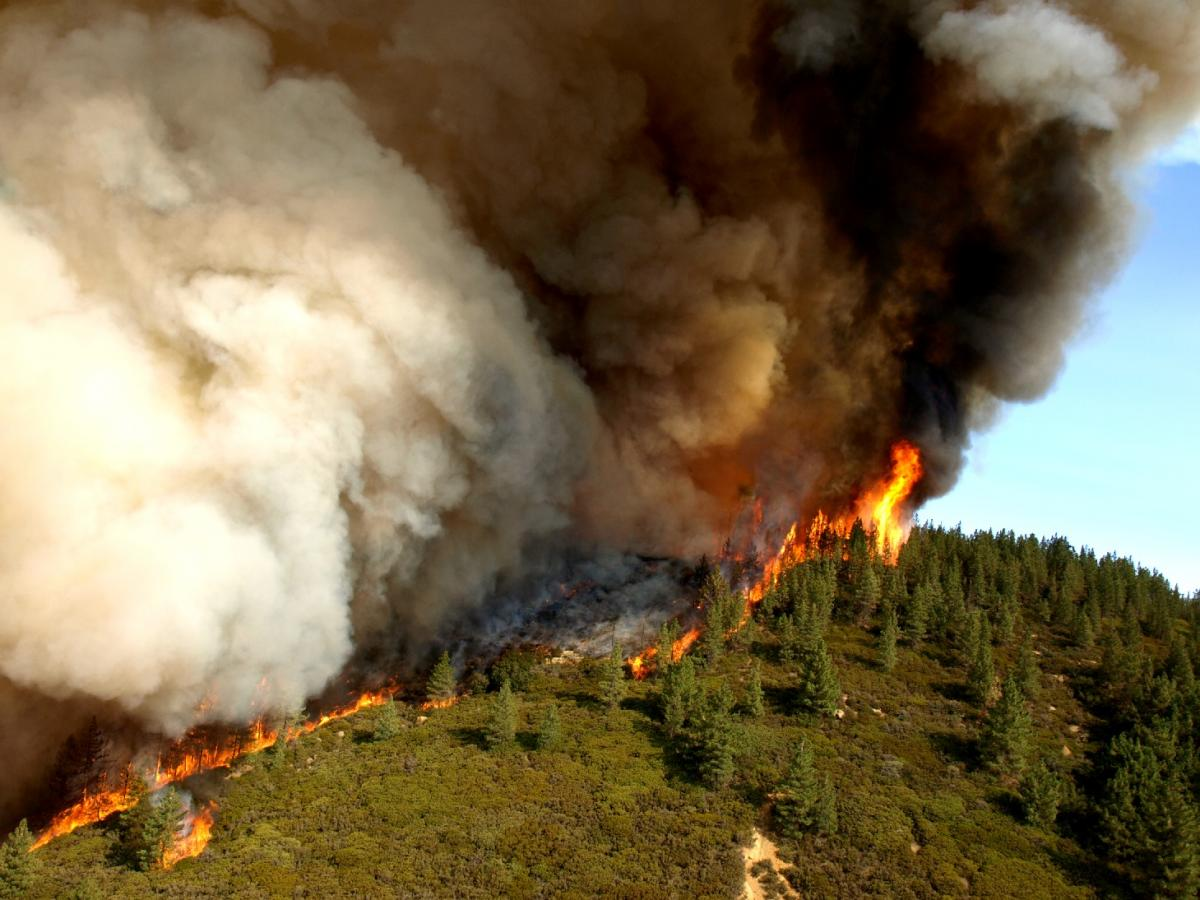
Active flame front of the Zaca Fire

Summers in inland California can see temperatures well over 100 °F (38 °C) during the day and less than 0.3 in (7.6 mm) of monthly rainfall, particularly in the southern areas. This makes them prone to wildfires. These can be life-threatening and cause evacuation. Wildfires are less common along the coast because of the cooler, more humid summers, but can occur in autumn when the marine layer is less common, making temperatures warmer and humidity drop significantly.

On occasion, fire whirls or fire tornadoes can develop within wildfires. One such event was rated an EF3, which developed in Redding in Shasta County within the Carr Fire. The fire whirl produced winds over 143 mph (230 km/h), killing four people and injuring six others.

== Winds ==
In February 2017, a winter storm produced a wind gust of 199 mph (320 km/h) at Ward Peak in Alpine Meadows ski resort.

== Glossary ==
The following are terms used to describe local or regional weather events.

- "Earthquake weather": Any nonseasonal, uncomfortable weather, typically hot and more humid than usual, and often associated with high and mid-level clouds, is spoken of as "earthquake weather", although there is no scientific basis for that relationship.
- Marine layer: The cool, moist layer of air coming in from the ocean which typically includes fog. A standard weather phenomenon along the northern and central California coast from late spring to early fall.
- May Gray/June Gloom: A characteristic weather pattern of late spring (May and June) in which a combination of inland heat, off-shore cool water, and prevailing wind patterns bring foggy and overcast weather to coastal regions. From Point Conception northwards the gloom continues until early autumn. (See also: Catalina eddy)
- Pineapple Express: A complex combination of events, bringing high levels of torrential precipitation to California. The Pineapple Express occurs when the jet stream dips across California, and warm, humid air from the mid-Pacific (from the vicinity of Hawaii–hence, the name) is drawn towards California. The resulting combination can cause extraordinarily heavy rains. A January 2005 Pineapple Express dropped nearly 25 inches (63.5 cm) of rain in Santa Barbara County.
- Santa Ana winds: Santa Anas are hot, high winds that blow from the eastern mountains and deserts towards coastal southern California, usually in the spring and fall. They are the result of air pressure buildup between the Sierra Nevada and the Rocky Mountains. This air mass spills out, is pulled by gravity, and circulates clockwise around the high pressure area, bringing winds from the east and northeast; as the air descends in elevation, it heats up and the humidity plummets to less than 15 percent. It is often said that the air is heated and dried as it passes through the nearby deserts, but according to meteorologists this is a popular misconception (it is actually due to adiabatic compression as the air flows from the higher elevations down to sea level); during Santa Ana conditions, it is typically hotter along the coast than in the deserts. As the Santa Ana winds are channeled through the mountain passes they can approach hurricane force. The combination of speed, heat, and dryness turns the chaparral into explosive fuel for wildfires.
- Tule fog: A thick ground fog that settles in the San Joaquin Valley and Sacramento Valley areas of the California Central Valley. Tule fog forms during the mid fall, winter to early spring after the first significant rainfall. This phenomenon is named after the tule grass wetlands of the Central Valley. Tule fog can extend from Bakersfield to Chico. Accidents caused by the tule fog are the leading cause of weather-related deaths in California; visibility is usually less than an eighth of a mile (about 600 feet or 183–200 m), but can be less than 10 feet (3 m).

== See also ==
- Climate change in California
- Climate of southern California
- Floods in California
- List of wettest known tropical cyclones in California
