= Earthquake weather (disambiguation) =

Earthquake weather is a type of weather popularly believed to precede earthquakes.

Earthquake Weather may also refer to:

- Earthquake Weather (album), a 1989 album by Joe Strummer
- "Earthquake Weather", a song by Beck from Guero
- Earthquake Weather (novel), a 1997 novel by Tim Powers
- Earthquake Weather, a novel by Catherine Ryan Hyde
