= Electron emission =

Ejection of an electron from the surface of matter, or atomic nucleus

In physics, electron emission is the ejection of an electron from the surface of matter, or, in beta decay (β− decay), where a beta particle (a fast energetic electron or positron) is emitted from an atomic nucleus transforming the original nuclide to an isobar.

== Radioactive decay ==
- In beta decay (β− decay), radioactive decay results in a beta particle (fast energetic electron or positron in β+ decay) being emitted from the nucleus
- Internal conversion – Process where an excited nucleus ejects an orbital electron from its atom

== Surface emission ==
- Thermionic emission, the liberation of electrons from an electrode by virtue of its temperature
  - Schottky emission, due to the:
    - Schottky effect or field enhanced thermionic emission
- Field electron emission, emission of electrons induced by an electrostatic field

=== Devices ===
- An electron gun or electron emitter, is an electrical component in some vacuum tubes that uses surface emission

== Others ==
- Exoelectron emission, a weak electron emission, appearing only from pretreated objects
- Photoelectric effect, the emission of electrons when electromagnetic radiation, such as light, hits a material

== See also ==
- Positron emission, (of a positron or "antielectron") is one aspect of β+ decay
- Electron excitation, the transfer of an electron to a higher atomic orbital
