= Geology of the Comoros =

The Comoros island chain in the Mozambique Channel is the result of the rifting of Madagascar away from Africa as well as "hotspot" mantle plume activity. The region is also impact by seismicity and deformation associated with the East African Rift system and the Comoros region is one of the best places in the world to study rift-hotspot interactions. The islands remain volcanically active.

== Stratigraphy and tectonics ==
The Comoros location in the Mozambique Channel is tectonically complex, due to the displacement of the Malagasarian microcontinent from the margin of the supercontinent Gondwana.

=== Mesozoic ===
From the Permian until the Early Jurassic, the Comoros region experienced Karoo rifting, on a northeast–southwest trend. During the Middle Jurassic and Early Cretaceous, an ocean basin, running north–south, formed along the Davie Ridge.

=== Cenozoic ===
The volcanoes in the Comoros date to the recent past of the Pliocene, Pleistocene and Holocene period. The oldest volcano on the chain is 7.7 million years old, on Mayotte. Volcanoes are older further east. Anjouan is 3.9 million years old and Moheli is five million years old. Grande Comore is the youngest at only 10,000 years old. Some geologists have proposed that the Comoros is an example of one of 11 primary mantle plumes worldwide.

The volcanoes produce alkali olivine basalt, although small amounts of phonolite and trachytic lava have also been found. Scoria and pozzolanic tuff is known from Grande Comore, Anjouan and Moheli.

The East African Rift System became active 22 to 25 million years ago in the Miocene and its offshore extent is the youngest. The rift system causes seismicity, extensional deformation and created the offshore Kerimbas Graben.

== Natural hazards ==
Mount Karthala is an active volcano on Grande Comore, which erupted in April, 2005 and May, 2006.

== Natural resources ==
There is very little mining in the Comoros, aside from the production of building material. In some cases, coral is mined to produce lime for concrete.
