= 11 November 2018 Mayotte seismic event =

Mayotte is an island group near Madagascar, in the Indian Ocean

On 11 November 2018, a seismic event of unknown origin occurred about 24 kilometres (15 mi) off the coast of Mayotte, an overseas department and region of France in the Indian Ocean. It was recorded by seismograms globally, including in Kenya, Chile, New Zealand, Canada, and Hawaii, almost 18,000 kilometres (11,000 mi) away. Despite this, no one felt it. The seismic waves lasted for over 20 minutes. Most earthquakes have P waves and S waves, which are later followed by long-period surface waves. The Mayotte event lacked P waves and S waves, but did cause a long-period surface wave travelling at 14,000 km/h (9,000 mph) around the globe. Additionally, the signal released by the earthquake resembled a clean sine wave, while most earthquake waves have multiple frequencies.

== Cause ==
The cause of the event was initially unknown, but scientists from the French Geological Survey believe it may have been caused by an underwater volcano, and also related to an earthquake swarm nearby. The island of Mayotte had experienced hundreds of tremors since May 2018, including a magnitude 5.8 earthquake on 15 May. The quakes had been tapering off until the event occurred.

Another possible explanation that was suggested was that magma from a volcanic chamber approximately 16 km (10 mi) miles underneath the seafloor near Mayotte had suddenly drained, which could have led to the collapse of the roof of the chamber, causing the vibrations.

In May 2019, a recently formed 800 meter high undersea volcano was found in the area of the event. This volcano is now assumed to have been the cause of the tremors.
