= Exoelectron emission =

Weak electron emission from specially pretreated objects

In atomic physics, exoelectron emission (EE) is a weak electron emission, appearing only from pretreated (irradiated, deformed etc.) objects. The pretreatment ("excitation") turns the objects into an unequilibrial state. EE accompanies the relaxation of these unequilibria. The relaxation can be stimulated e.g. by slight heating or longwave illumination, not causing emission from untreated samples. Accordingly, thermo- and photostimulated EE (TSEE, PSEE) are distinguished. Thus, EE is an electron emission analogue of such optical phenomena as phosphorescence, thermo- and photostimulated luminescence.
