= Earthquake swarm =

Series of localized seismic events within a short time period

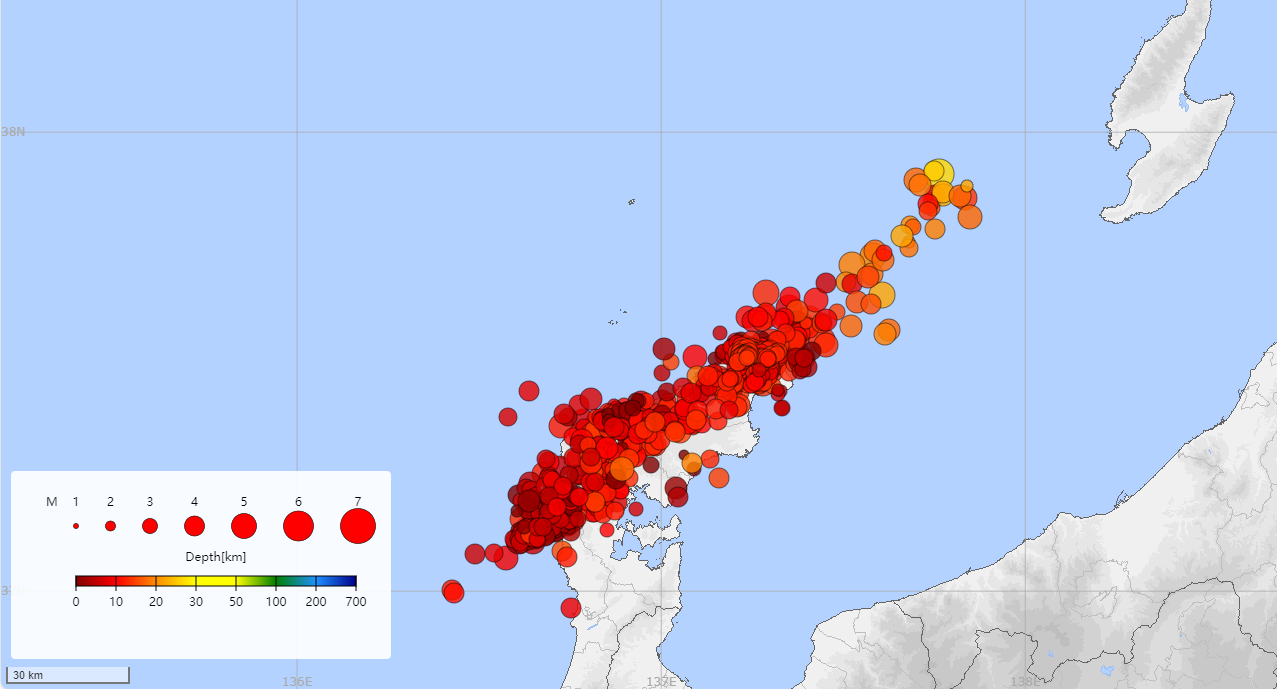
Noto earthquake swarm (2020–2024)

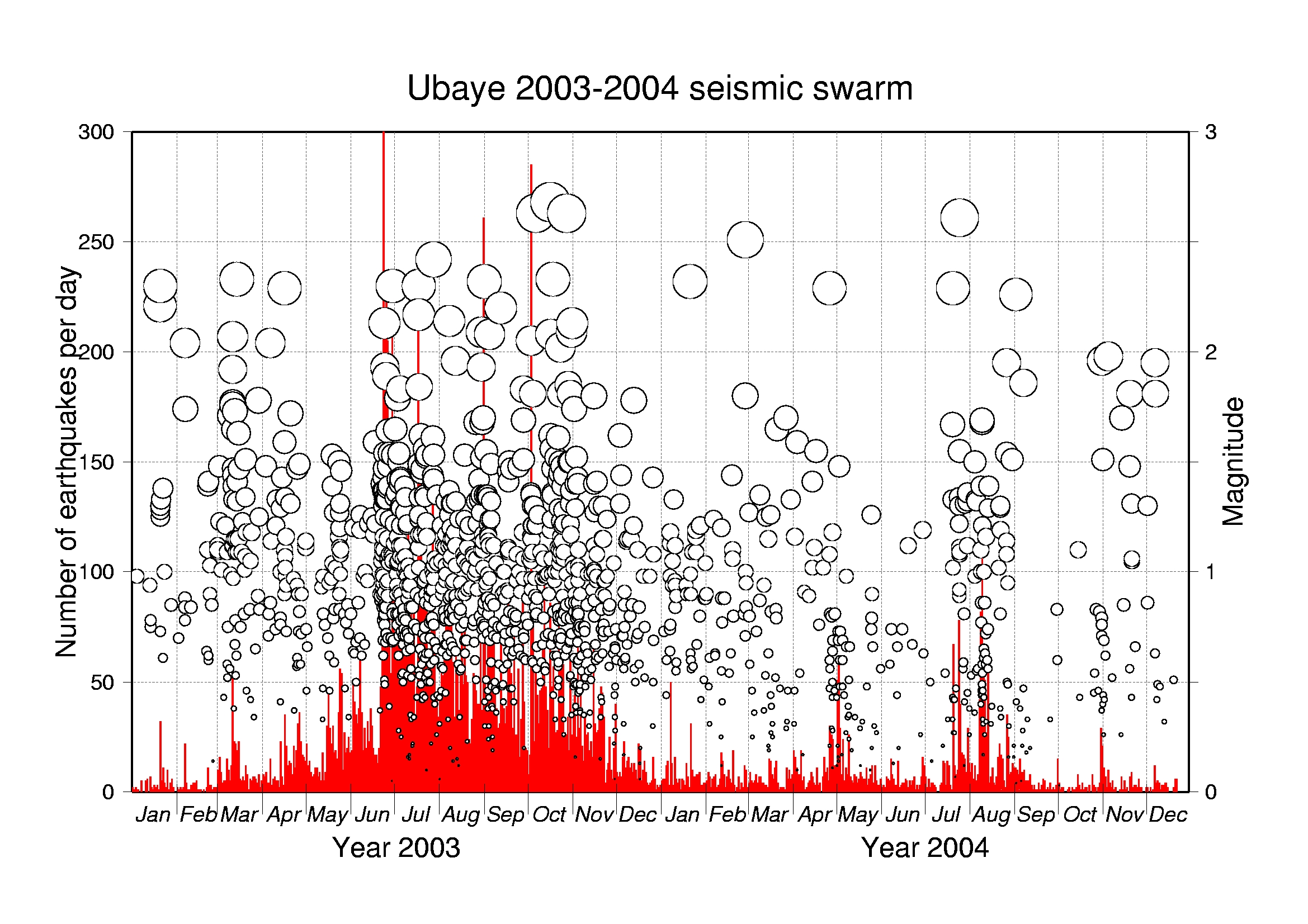
Chronology of the 2003–2004 Ubaye earthquake swarm Complete caption Each red bar shows the number of earthquakes daily detected (left-handside scale). More than 16,000 earthquakes were detected within 2 years. White circles show the magnitude of ~1,400 earthquakes which could be located (right-handside magnitude scale). Sismalp (the local monitoring network) was not able to locate all events below magnitude 1, which explains why very-small-magnitude events are seemingly lacking. (According to the Gutenberg–Richter law, M0 events are approximately 10 times more numerous than M1 events.)

In seismology, an earthquake swarm is a sequence of seismic events occurring in a local area within a relatively short period. The time span used to define a swarm varies, but may be days, months, or years. Such an energy release is different from the situation when a major earthquake (main shock) is followed by a series of aftershocks: in earthquake swarms, no single earthquake in the sequence is obviously the main shock. In particular, a cluster of aftershocks occurring after a mainshock is not a swarm.

== History and generalities ==
The Ore Mountains (Erzgebirge), which form the border between the Czech Republic and Germany, western Bohemia and the Vogtland region, have been known since the 16th century as being prone to frequent earthquake swarms, which typically last a few weeks to a few months. In 1899, Austrian geologist Josef Knett, while studying a swarm of about a hundred events felt in western Bohemia/Vogtland between January and February 1824, coined the noun Schwarmbeben, i.e. "swarm [earth]quake". The term "swarm" comes from the fact that hypocentres give the impression of agglutinating like a bee swarm when plotted onto a map, a cross-section or a 3D model.

One of the best-documented swarms occurred near Matsushiro, a suburb of Nagano, to the north-west of Tokyo. The Matsushiro swarm lasted from 1965 to 1967 and generated about 1 million earthquakes. This swarm had the peculiarity of being sited just under a seismological observatory installed in 1947 in a decommissioned military tunnel. It began in August 1965 with three earthquakes too weak to be felt, but three months later, a hundred earthquakes could be felt daily. On 17 April 1966, the observatory counted 6,780 earthquakes, with 585 of them having a magnitude great enough to be felt, which means that an earthquake could be felt, on average, every two and a half minutes. The phenomenon was clearly identified as linked to a magma uplift, perhaps initiated by the 1964 Niigata earthquake, which occurred the previous year.

Earthquake swarms are common in volcanic regions such as Japan, Central Italy, the Afar depression or Iceland, where they occur before and during eruptions, but they are also observed in zones of Quaternary volcanism or of hydrothermal circulation, such as Vogtland/western Bohemia and the Vosges massif, and less frequently far from tectonic plate boundaries in locations such as Nevada, Oklahoma or Scotland. In all cases, high-pressure fluid migration in the Earth's crust seems to be the trigger mechanism and the driving process that govern the evolution of the swarm in space and time. The Hochstaufen earthquake swarm in Bavaria, with 2 km-deep (1.2 mi) foci, is one of the rare examples where an indisputable relationship between seismic activity and precipitation could be established.

Earthquake swarms raise public-safety issues: first, because the end of seismic activity cannot be predicted; second, because it is uncertain whether another earthquake with a magnitude larger than those of previous shocks in the sequence will occur (the 2009 L'Aquila earthquake in Italy illustrates this, with an M_{W} 6.3 shock following a swarm activity with magnitudes between 1 and 3). Even though swarms usually generate moderate shocks, the persistence of felt earthquakes can be disruptive and cause distress to the population.

== Examples ==
The following examples were chosen for peculiarities of certain swarms (for instance: large number of events, complex interaction with larger shocks, long period of time, ultra-shallow focal depth), or because of their geographical region, some swarms occurring in otherwise aseismic regions. It is not intended to be a list of all the swarms happening worldwide.

=== Asia ===
==== India ====
- Since 11 November 2018, an earthquake swarm has been observed in the region of Dahanu, Maharashtra, an otherwise aseismic area. Ten to twenty quakes are felt daily, with magnitudes usually smaller than 3.5 (maximum magnitude 4.1 in February 2019). Even with this low-level of magnitude, two shocks proved destructive and even lethal, probably because their foci were very shallow.
- Bamhori village in Seoni district is also experiencing regular earthquakes since February 2000.

==== Philippines ====
- An earthquake swarm occurred from early April 2017 to mid August 2017 in the province of Batangas. Four shocks in the 5.5–6.3 magnitude range (2017 Batangas earthquakes) caused damage in southern Luzon; they occurred at the beginning of the swarm: M_{s}5.5 (4 April), M_{s}5.6 and M_{s}6.0 (8 April), and M_{s}6.3 (11 April). The origin of the 3 first major quakes seems established since they had practically the same epicentre; they occurred within the crust (7–28 km (4–17 mi) depth range). However, the strongest and latest quake does not seem related to the swarm: its epicentre is 50 km (30 mi) away, and its focal depth is moreover very different (177 km (110 mi), according to Phivolcs, the local seismic monitoring agency, a value which classifies this quake as an "intermediate-depth event"). This example shows how complex can be the interaction between a swarm and an independent earthquake, even though this last one is very likely to have been triggered by the swarm activity.
- October 15, 2020, an earthquake swarm occurred on the island of Panay ranging from magnitudes 2.5-4.5. Most of these quakes felt in Iloilo City. A previous swarm also hit Panay on November 5, 2018 (Including Antique, Iloilo and Guimaras) ranging from magnitudes 4.0-4.8. The first earthquake (magnitude 4.7) at 7:45 A.M, occurred at San Jose, Antique. Just a few minutes after, the second quake (magnitude 4.0) occurred at Sibunag, Guimaras. At 10:54 A.M, The third quake (magnitude 4.8) occurred at Guimbal, Iloilo. Intensity 4 was felt in Iloilo City
- A series of earthquakes that hit Mindanao in 2019 were classified as an earthquake swarm.
  On October 16, a magnitude 6.3 (M_{wp}) Struck Tulunan cotabato (Epicenter of earthquake). Intensity VII was felt in Tulunan, M'lang, Makilala and Kidapawan City, Cotabato. Intensity VI was felt in Digos City, Davao del Sur; Santo Niño, South Cotabato and Tacurong City, Sultan Kudarat. On October 29, a magnitude 6.6 (M_{ww}) struck Tulunan again. At least ten deaths were reported and four hundred individuals were injured. Intensity VII was recorded in Tulunan and Makilala; Kidapawan City; Digos City, Bansalan and Magsaysay, Davao del Sur and Malungon, Sarangani. Intensity VI was recorded in Koronadal City and Davao City. Just 2 days after on October 31, an earthquake struck Tulunan again (Magnitude 6.5M_{ww}) The death toll of two quakes was raised into 24 and 563 were injured. Eva's Hotel in Kidapawan City collapsed during the quake
- On October 14-18 2021 an earthquake swarm occurred on Camarines Sur ranging from magnitudes 1.7-4.3 with the depth of 1–40 km. Some of these events were felt on Camarines Norte and Albay. PHIVOLCS recorded at least 27 earthquakes (10 were felt) in Camarines Sur.

=== Europe ===
==== Iceland ====
- A swarm of intense earthquakes in the Reykjanes Peninsula, Iceland began on 24 October 2023, due to a magmatic intrusion underneath the area. The frequency and intensity of the earthquakes dramatically increased 10 November, with 20,000 tremors recorded by that time, the largest of which exceeded magnitude 5.2. An evacuation was ordered in the town of Grindavík, which is located near the area of the seismic activity. Large-scale subsidence in and around the town is reported to have caused significant damage. An earthquake swarm began on the evening of 24 October due to the magmatic intrusion, with the intensity of the earthquakes decreasing by 30 October. Approximately 8,000 earthquakes were detected; most of these tremors occurred at a depth of 2–4 km (1.2–2.5 mi). The Icelandic Meteorological Office (IMO) reported that the swarm was focused around Svartsengi, north of Grindavík. About 700 earthquakes were recorded earlier in the month, the largest reaching magnitude 3.3.The largest of the earthquakes to date reached magnitude 5.1 on 10 November. By this time, over 22,000 earthquakes had been recorded since the beginning of the swarm in October. The IMO predicted that an eruption was likely, stating that "it will take several days (rather than hours) for magma to reach the surface." The greatest extent of the magma intrusion was inferred to be around the Sundhnúkur crater chain, approximately 3.5 km (2.2 mi) north of Grindavík. Instruments detected the presence of sulphur dioxide in the atmosphere on 14 November, indicating that magma was now only a few hundred metres under the surface. Although the number of earthquakes decreased somewhat since 10 November, the IMO was still recording between 700 and 1,000 earthquakes daily by 14 November. Ground deformation sensors at Festarfjall [ˈfɛstarˌfjatl̥] and Svartsengi recorded that the ground had moved apart by 120 centimetres (47 in). Satellite measurements recorded the subsidence by about one metre (3 ft 3 in) of a swathe of land measuring approximately five kilometers long and two kilometers wide (3.1 by 1.2 mi), running from the Sundhnúkur craters to the western side of Grindavík. The creation of this graben-like formation has enabled scientists to estimate the volume of the magmatic intrusion as approximately 70 million cubic metres (2.5 billion cubic feet). It is estimated that the subsidence has been continuing at a rate of about four centimeters (1.6 inches) a day. A large crack opened up through the town, which old maps indicate is a reactivation of an existing fault. Scientists at the University of Iceland believe that the fault was created by the last Sundhnúkur eruption over 2,000 years ago. Sensors emplaced in a borehole in Svartsengi detected the presence of sulphur dioxide on 16 November, a classic signature of magma close to the surface. This has led the IMO to conclude that the area around the volcanic edifice of Hagafell, approximately 2 km (1.2 mi) north of Grindavík, is at the highest level of risk. A rapid 30 mm (1.2 in) uplift of the ground in the Svartsengi area was recorded from 18 to 21 November, likely indicating an upwelling of magma from a source five or more kilometers below the ground. A series of eruptions started on 18 December 2023 and was ongoing as of April 2025.

==== Czech Republic / Germany ====
- The western Bohemia/Vogtland region is the border area between the Czech Republic and Germany where earthquake swarms were first studied at the end of the 19th century. Swarm activity is recurrent there, sometimes with large maximum magnitudes, as for instance in 1908 (maximum magnitude 5.0), 1985–1986 (4.6), 2000 (3.2), or 2008 (3.8). This latter swarm occurred near Nový Kostel in October 2008 and lasted only 4 weeks, but up to 25,000 events were detected by WEBNET, the local monitoring network. The swarm is located on a steeply dipping fault plane where an overall upward migration of activity was observed (first events at the bottom and last events at the top of the activated fault patch).

==== France ====
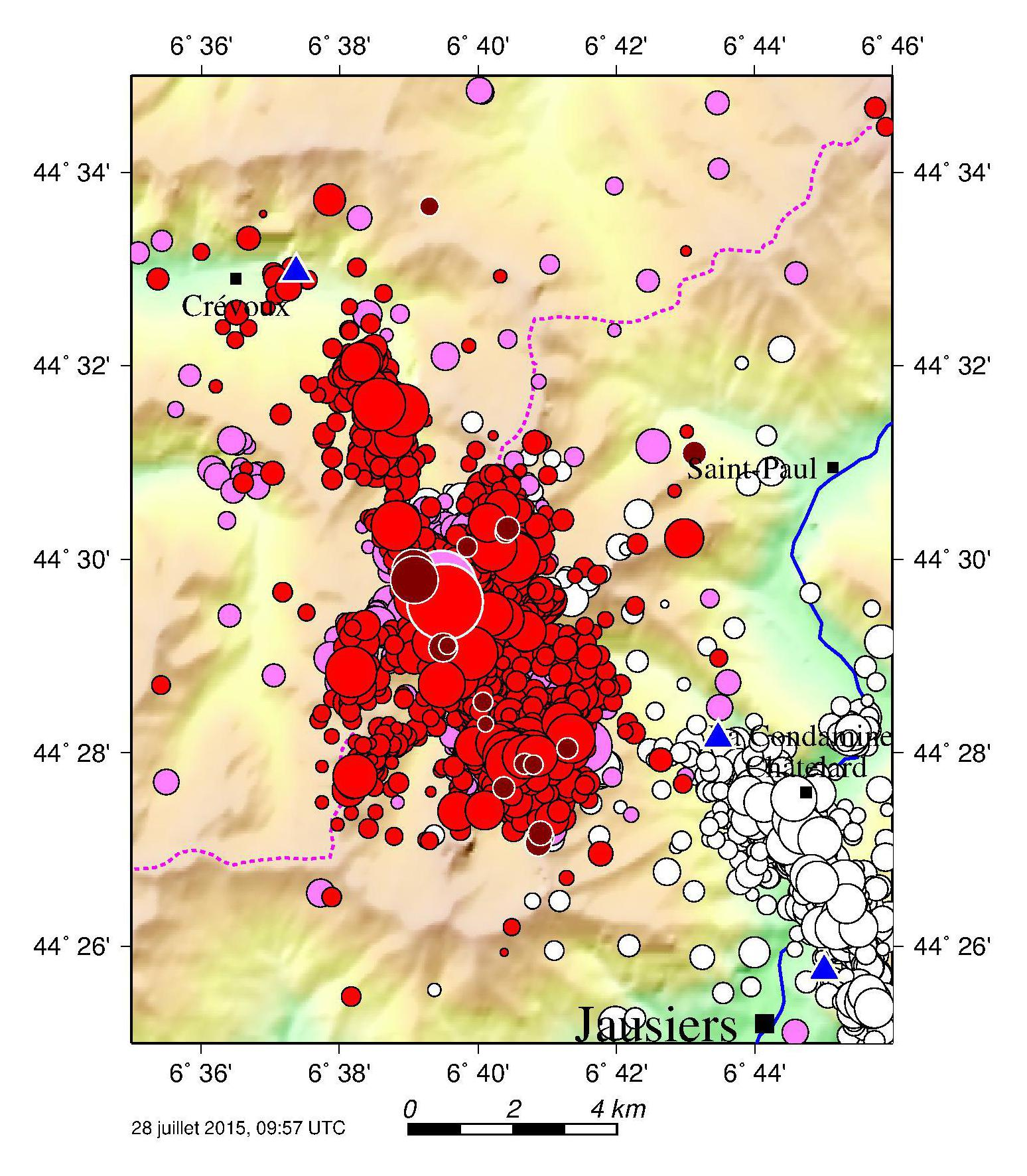
Ubaye earthquake swarms Complete caption White: 2003–2004 swarm; pink: 2012–2015 swarm up to 2014-04-06; red: earthquakes as of 2014-04-07; pink and red lined up in white: epicentres of 2012-02-26 earthquake (M=4.3) and 2014-04-07 earthquake (M=4.8); brown: latest 20 earthquakes in July 2015, just before the map was drawn. Symbol size directly proportional to magnitude. Blue triangles show the 3 nearest seismic stations.

- In Alpes-de-Haute-Provence, the Ubaye Valley is the most active seismic zone in the French Alps. Earthquakes can follow there the classical scheme "mainshock + aftershocks" (for instance the 1959 M5.5 earthquake, which caused heavy damage and two casualties). But seismic energy is principally released by swarms. This is particularly the case in the upper valley, between Barcelonnette and the French-Italian border. At the beginning of the 21st century, La Condamine-Châtelard experienced an exceptional swarm activity in an area where usually only a few low-magnitude events occur every year. A first swarm developed in 2003–2004 when more than 16,000 events were detected by the local monitoring network, but with magnitudes keeping to low values (2.7). On a map, the 2003–2004 swarm is 8 km (5 mi) long. After a period of almost complete inactivity, it was followed by a second swarm (2012–2014), slightly offset by a few kilometres, and with a length of 11 km (6.8 mi). This second swarm was initiated by an M4.3 earthquake in February 2012. Another M4.8 earthquake in April 2014 reactivated the swarm in 2014–2015. These two major shocks, which caused damage in the nearby localities, were of course followed by their own short sequence of aftershocks, but such a 4-year activity for moderate magnitude shocks clearly characterizes a swarm. Most foci were located in the 4–11 km (2.5–6.8 mi) depth range, within the crystalline basement. Focal mechanisms involve normal faulting, but also strike-slip faulting.
- In the lower Rhône Valley, the Tricastin has been known from the 18th century as the seat of earthquake swarms which sometimes caused damage, as in 1772–1773 and 1933–1936, and which were characterized by barrage-like detonations—at least so reported by the inhabitants. No seismic activity had been documented in the region since 1936, when a very weak swarm appeared for a few months in 2002–2003 (maximal magnitude 1.7). Had their foci not been sited just under a hamlet in the vicinity of Clansayes, and very close to the surface (200 m (660 ft) deep), these shocks would have gone unnoticed. In such a scenario of "ultra-shallow" seismicity, even earthquakes of very low magnitude (1, or 0, or even negative magnitude) can be felt as explosions or water-hammer noises, more than as vibrations. Most foci were located in an Upper-Cretaceous reef-limestone slab which bursts out periodically in the course of centuries for still unknown reasons for a few months or a few years. A 200-m focal depth is believed to be a worldwide record value for tectonic events.
- In the French Alps, the Maurienne Valley is from time to time prone to earthquake swarms. During the 19th century, a protracted swarm lasted 5 years and a half, from December 1838 to June 1844. Some earthquakes of the sequence caused damage in the region close to Saint-Jean-de-Maurienne, but this long swarm with many felt events made things particularly difficult for the population. More recently, a swarm appeared in October 2015 near Montgellafrey, in the lower part of the valley. Its activity kept low until 17 October 2017, when more than 300 earthquakes occurred within two weeks, with a maximal magnitude of 3.7 being reached twice in late October 2017. The seismic activity lasted another full year, thus yielding a duration of more than 3 years for the full swarm.

==== Greece ====
Since January 26, 2025, intense seismic activity has been observed between Amorgos and Santorini, centered on Anydros. Specifically, over 7,700 earthquakes of which around 100 exceeded magnitude 4 on the Richter scale have been observed, with the largest earthquake being 5.2R on the evening of February 5.

=== Central America ===
==== El Salvador ====
- In April 2017, the Salvadoran municipality of Antiguo Cuscatlán, a suburb of San Salvador, experienced a sequence of close to 500 earthquakes within 2 days, with magnitudes in the 1.5–5.1 range. There was one casualty and minor damage due to the strongest quake. Local experts did not identify any anomalous activity at nearby volcanoes.

=== North America ===
==== United States ====
- Between February and November 2008, Nevada experienced a swarm of 1,000 low-magnitude quakes generally referred to as the 2008 Reno earthquakes. The peak activity was in April 2008, when 3 quakes with magnitudes larger than 4 occurred within 2 days. The largest one registered a moment magnitude of 4.9 and caused damage in the immediate area around the epicenter.
- The Yellowstone Caldera, a supervolcano in NW Wyoming, has experienced several strong earthquake swarms since the end of the 20th century. In 1985, more than 3,000 earthquakes were observed over a period of several months. More than 70 smaller swarms have been detected since. The United States Geological Survey states these swarms are likely caused by slips on pre-existing faults rather than by movements of magma or hydrothermal fluids. At the turn of the year 2008, more than 500 quakes were detected under the NW end of Yellowstone Lake over a seven-day span, with the largest registering a magnitude of 3.9. Another swarm started in January 2010, after the Haiti earthquake. With 1,620 small events in late January 2010, this swarm is the second-largest ever recorded in the Yellowstone Caldera. Interestingly, most of these swarms have "rapid-fire" characteristics: they seemingly appear out of nowhere and can churn out tens or hundreds of small to moderate quakes within a very short time frame. Such swarms usually occur within the caldera boundary, as was especially the case in 2018.

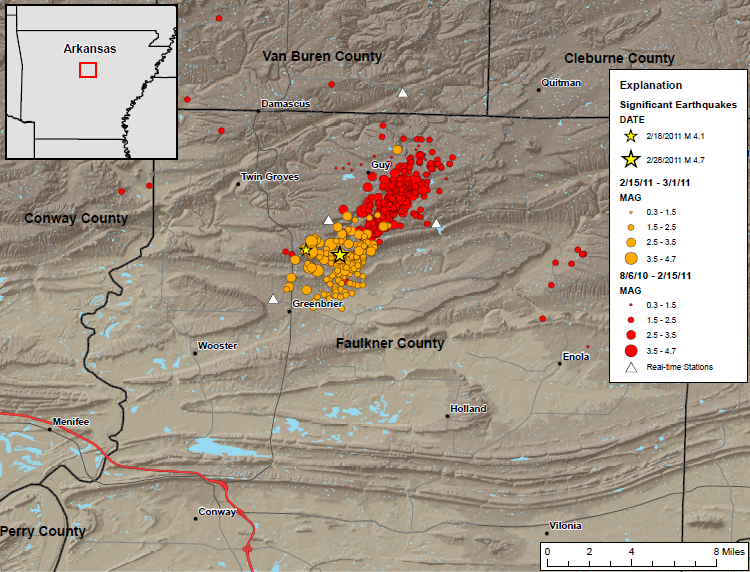
Guy-Greenbrier earthquake swarm: map of epicentres for the period 2010-08-06 to 2011-03-01.

- The Guy–Greenbrier earthquake swarm occurred in central Arkansas beginning in August 2010. Epicentres show a linear distribution, with a clear overall shift in activity towards the southwest with time, and a magnitude of 4.7 was computed for the largest event. Analysis of the swarm has suggested a link with deep waste disposal drilling. It has led to a moratorium on such drilling.
- On 2 September 2017, an earthquake swarm appeared around Soda Springs, Idaho. Five quakes with magnitudes between 4.6 and 5.3 occurred within 9 days. Keeping the 2009 L'Aquila case in mind, and because Idaho had experienced an M6.9 earthquake in 1983, experts warned residents that a stronger quake could follow (an unlikely but still possible scenario for them).
- From early 2016 to late 2019, a swarm of earthquakes occurred near Cahuilla in Riverside County, California. More than 22,000 individual seismic events were recorded, ranging in magnitude from 0.7 to 4.4. The strongest one occurred in August 2018, south of Lake Riverside, just off Cahuilla Road (SR 371). By using computer algorithms and machine learning, researchers were able to infer the following detailed picture of the Cahuilla fault zone responsible for the earthquake swarm. The fault zone is no more than 50 m (160 ft) wide, 4 km (2.5 mi) long, with the earliest seismic swarm events localized down near its base at 9 km (5.6 mi) below the surface and the latest events migrating upwards to 5 km (3.1 mi) below the surface and spreading throughout the fault zone's length. Containing complex subterranean horizontal channels and prominent bents in its depth profile, the fault zone sits on top of a deeper natural underground reservoir of fluid under pressure with a connector at 8 km (5.0 mi) below the surface that was initially sealed off from the fault zone. When that seal broke open in early 2016, fluids were injected up into the fault zone's base and diffused slowly through the complex channels up to 5 km (3.1 mi) below the surface, which triggered the prolonged earthquake swarm that lasted until late 2019. This analysis provides detailed evidence that fault zone valving is a mechanism for seismogenesis in swarms.

=== Atlantic Ocean ===
- In El Hierro, the smallest and farthest south and west of the Canary Islands, hundreds of small earthquakes were recorded from July 2011 until October 2011 during the 2011–12 El Hierro eruption. The accumulated energy released by the swarm increased dramatically on 28 September. The swarm was due to the movement of magma beneath the island, and on 9 October a submarine volcanic eruption was detected.

=== Indian Ocean ===
- An earthquake swarm began east of Mayotte on 10 May 2018. The strongest quake (M5.9), the largest-magnitude event ever recorded in the Comoro zone, struck on 15 May 2018. The swarm includes thousands of quakes, many of them felt by Maorais residents. Temporarily installed ocean-bottom seismometers showed that the swarm active zone was sited 10 km (6.2 mi) east of Mayotte, deep into the oceanic lithosphere (in the 20–50 km (10–30 mi) depth range), a rather surprising result because the swarm was believed to be caused by the deflation of a magma reservoir located 45 km (28 mi) east of Mayotte, at a depth of 28 km (17 mi). (Accordingly, an oceanographic campaign discovered in May 2019 a new submarine volcano, 800 m high (2,600 ft) and located 50 km (31 mi) east of Mayotte.) The swarm had been tapering off between August and November 2018 when the 11-November-2018 event occurred. This event had no detectable P nor S waves, but generated surface waves which could be observed worldwide by seismological observatories. Its origin is thought to be east of Mayotte. The swarm continued to be active all through 2019.

=== Pacific Ocean ===
- In January and February 2013, the Santa Cruz Islands experienced a large earthquake swarm with many magnitude 5 and 6 earthquakes: more than 40 quakes with magnitude 4.5 or larger took place during the previous 7 days, including 7 events with magnitude larger than 6. The swarm degenerated into the M8.0 2013 Solomon Islands earthquake (6 February 2013).

== See also ==
- 1951 East Rift Valley earthquakes
- 2009–26 Oklahoma earthquake swarms
- Blanco fracture zone
- Gutenberg–Richter law
- Guy–Greenbrier earthquake swarm
- Remotely triggered earthquakes
