= Donga Science =

South Korean science magazine (e. 1986)

- Categories: Science
- Frequency: Monthly
- First issue: January 1986
- Company: Donga Science
- Country: South Korea
- Language: Korean
- Website: http://media.dongascience.com/pc/science

Korean name
- Hangul: 과학동아
- Hanja: 科學東亞
- RR: Gwahak Donga
- MR: Kwahak Tonga

Donga Science (Korean: 과학동아) is a monthly magazine about science published in South Korea. It was first published in January 1986 with the motto "the joy of science is a window to the future" (과학을 느끼는 즐거움, 미래를 보는 창).

The magazine contains information about science, including new discoveries and breakthroughs. The company has created a similar math magazine (수학동아) and children's science magazine (어린이 과학동아).

== History ==
The magazine was first published by the magazine company Donga-Il-bo, but since 2000 it is made by Donga Science, which was separated from the original company. It is the longest-running monthly science magazine in Korea.
