= Matsushiro earthquake swarm =

1965 series of earthquakes in Japan

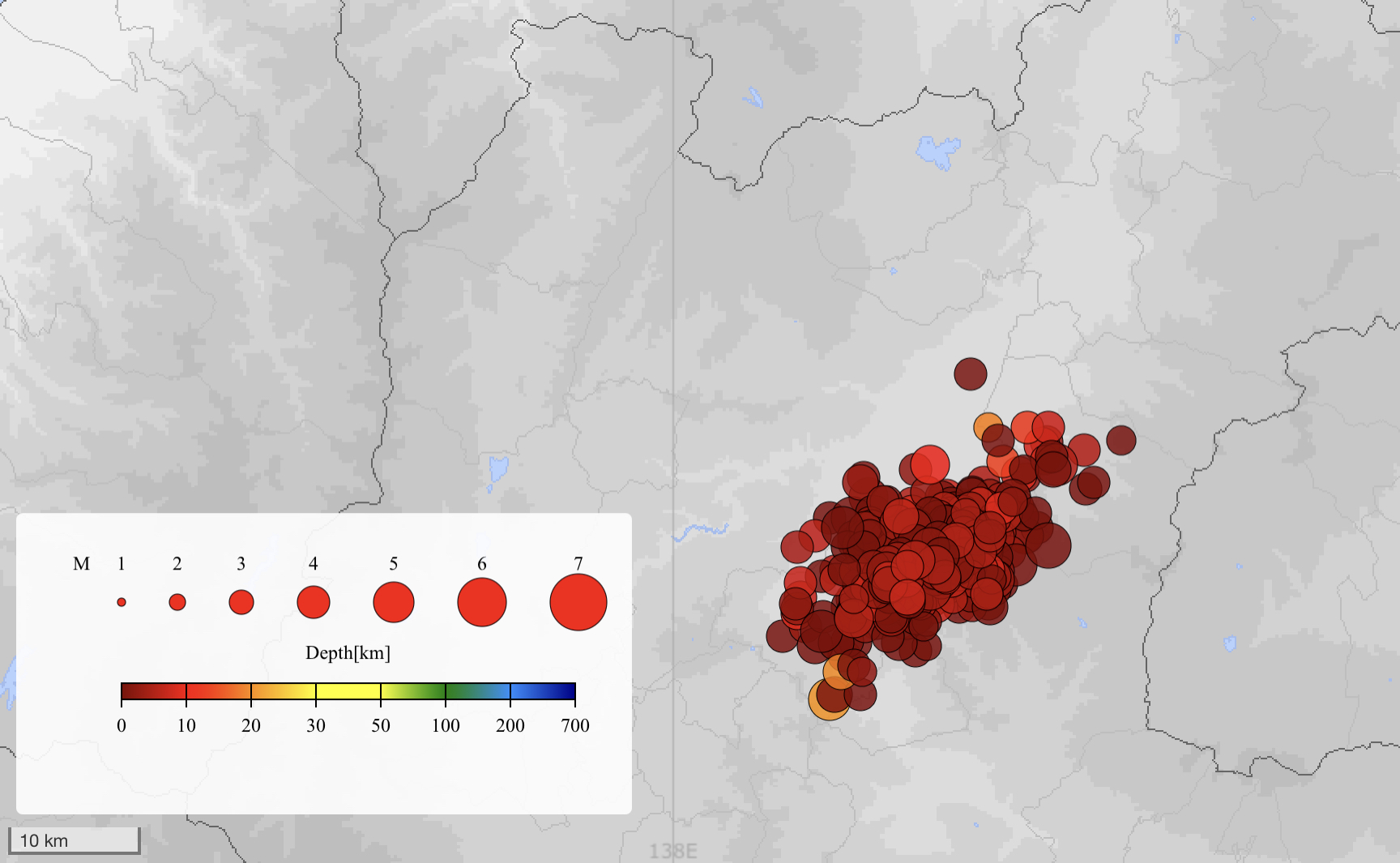
Epicenters distribution (August 1965 ~ May 1967)

The Matsushiro earthquake swarm (Japanese: 松代群発地震) was an earthquake swarm that occurred near Matsushiro, a suburb of Nagano, to the northwest of Tokyo in 1965. The event is one of the best ever documented earthquake swarms.

== Overview ==
The Matsushiro swarm lasted from 1965 to 1967 and generated about 1 million earthquakes. The total sum of energy from all the tremors was approximately equivalent to an M6.4 earthquake. This swarm had the peculiarity to be sited just under a seismological observatory installed in 1947 in a decommissioned military tunnel. It began in August 1965 with three earthquakes too weak to be felt, but three months later, a hundred earthquakes could be felt daily. On 17 April 1966, the observatory recorded 6,780 earthquakes, with 585 of them having a magnitude large enough to be felt, which meant that one earthquake could be felt every 2 minutes 30 seconds on average. The phenomenon was clearly identified as linked to a magma uplift, perhaps initiated by the 1964 Niigata earthquake which happened one year before.
