= Earthquake weather =

Weather believed to precede earthquakes

Earthquake weather is a type of weather popularly believed to precede earthquakes.

== History ==
Since ancient times, the notion that weather can somehow foreshadow coming seismic activity has been the topic of much discussion and debate. Geologist Russell Robinson has described "earthquake weather" as one of the most common pseudoscientific methods of predicting earthquakes.

Aristotle proposed in the 4th century BC that earthquakes were caused by winds trapped in caves. Small tremors were thought to have been caused by air pushing on the cavern roofs, and large ones by the air breaking the surface. This theory led to a belief in 'earthquake weather', that because a large amount of air was trapped underground, the weather would be hot and calm before an earthquake. A later theory stated that earthquakes occurred in calm, cloudy conditions, and were usually preceded by strong winds, fireballs, and meteors. A modern theory proposes that certain cloud formations may be used to predict earthquakes; however, this idea is rejected by most geologists.

== Background on earthquakes ==
An earthquake is caused by a sudden slip on a fault. Tectonic plates are always slowly moving, but they can get stuck at their edges due to friction. When the stress on the edge of a tectonic plate overcomes the friction, there is an earthquake that releases energy in waves that travel through the Earth's crust and cause the shaking that is felt. For example, in California, there are two plates, the Pacific plate and the North American plate. The Pacific plate consists of most of the Pacific Ocean floor, and also includes Baja California and the California coastline. The North American plate comprises most of the North American continent, including the inland parts of California, as well as parts of the Atlantic and Arctic Oceans' floors. The primary boundary between these two plates is the San Andreas Fault. The San Andreas Fault is more than 800 miles long and extends to depths of at least 10 miles. Many other smaller faults like the Hayward (San Francisco Bay Area) and the San Jacinto (Southern California) join with the San Andreas to form the San Andreas Fault Zone. The Pacific plate grinds northwestward past the North American plate at a rate of about two inches per year.

== Earthquake cloud ==
Earthquake clouds are clouds claimed to be signs of imminent earthquakes. They have been described in antiquity: In chapter 32 of his work Brihat Samhita, Indian scholar Varahamihira (505–587) discussed a number of signs warning of earthquakes, including extraordinary clouds occurring a week before the earthquake. In modern times, some scientists have claimed to accurately predict earthquake occurrences by observing clouds. These claims, which were originally popularised in Japan during the 1940s, have gained significant traction in China. However, these claims have very little support in the scientific community.

== Psychology ==
It has been proposed by W. J. Humphreys that earthquake weather is not of geological causes, but merely a psychological manifestation. Humphreys argued that "the general state of irritation and sensitiveness developed in us during the hot, calm, perhaps sultry weather given this name, inclines us to sharper observation of earthquake disturbances and accentuates the impression they make on our senses, so that we retain more vivid memories of such quakes while possibly over-looking entirely the occurrences on other more soothing days".

== Scientific validity ==
Some recent research has found a correlation between a sudden relative spike in atmospheric temperature 2–5 days before an earthquake. It is speculated that this rise is caused by the movement of ions within the Earth's crust, related to an oncoming earthquake. Furthermore, this relative temperature change would not cause any single recognizable weather pattern that could be labelled "earthquake weather".

At the 2011 American Geophysical Union Fall Meeting, Shimon Wdowinski announced an apparent temporal connection between tropical cyclones and earthquakes.

In April 2013, a team of seismologists at the Georgia Institute of Technology re-examined data from the 2011 Virginia earthquake using pattern-recognition software and found a correlation between Hurricane Irene's nearby passage and an unexpected rise in the number of aftershocks.

== See also ==
- Earthquake light
- Earthquake prediction
