= Fog season =

Time of year in which fog is most common

Dense Tule fog in Bakersfield, California. Visibility in this photo is less than 500 feet (150 m).

The fog season is a season of fog that occurs in some places, because of special meteorological and topographical characteristics, after a rainy period. The fog season is usually based in the cooler months (late autumn, winter and early spring).

An example is found in the San Joaquin Valley and Sacramento Valley areas of California's Great Central Valley, where a thick ground fog, known as Tule fog, may form, in particular in the months from November through March. In the Tampa Bay area of Florida, the fog season is from December to February. Sydney's fog season is longer, starting from April through to October. Though it's more frequent in June due to more rain. In the Indo-Gangetic Plain of India, Bangladesh, Pakistan, a thick radiation fog forms from December to early February. It forms at night when ground temperatures are cool, wind speeds are low, and the air has ample moisture.

It is not generally true that fog season in a given area is during autumn or winter (the cooler months); for example, the Japanese coast of the Pacific Ocean has a dense fog season from May to August. The June Gloom, a cloudy and foggy phenomena, experienced in the southern coast of California occurs in late spring and early summer (May and June).
