= Fog =

Atmospheric phenomenon

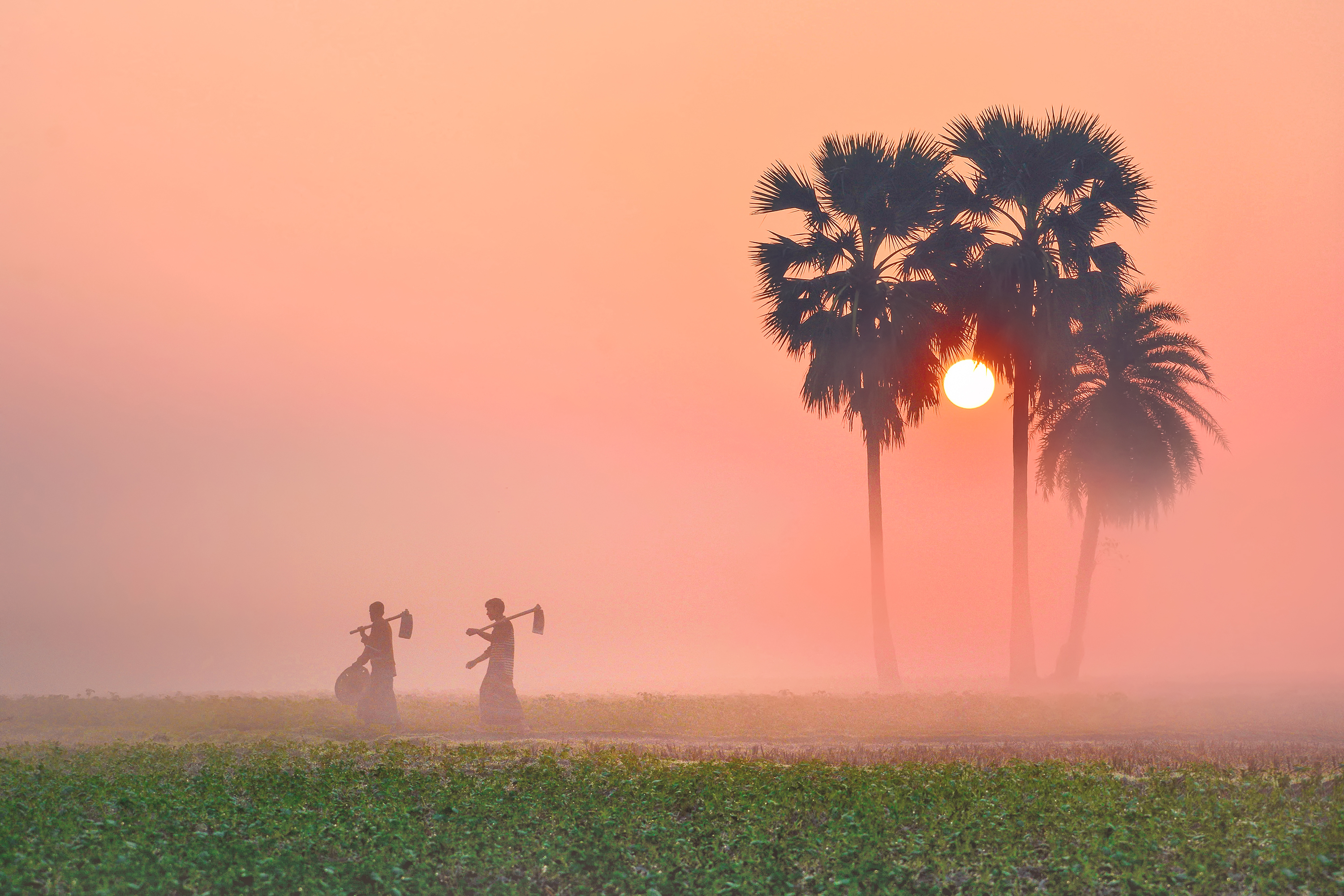
Light fog in Bangladesh

Fog is a visible aerosol consisting of tiny water droplets or ice crystals held in the air near the Earth's surface. Fog can be considered a type of low-lying cloud usually resembling stratus and is heavily influenced by nearby bodies of water, topography, and wind conditions. In turn, fog affects many human activities, such as shipping, travel, and warfare. Recent atmospheric research indicates that fog also functions as an active aquatic ecosystem. Fog droplets harbor microbiomes where bacteria actively grow, divide, and interact with atmospheric chemistry.

Fog appears when water vapor (water in its gaseous form) condenses. During condensation, molecules of water vapor combine to make tiny water droplets that hang in the air. Sea fog, which shows up near bodies of saline water, is formed as water vapor condenses on bits of salt. Fog is similar to, but less transparent than, mist.

== Definition ==
The term fog is typically distinguished from the more generic term cloud in that fog is low-lying, and the moisture in the fog is often generated locally (such as from a nearby body of water, like a lake or ocean, or from nearby moist ground or marshes). By definition, fog reduces visibility to less than 1 km (0.62 mi), whereas mist causes lesser impairment of visibility.

== Formation ==
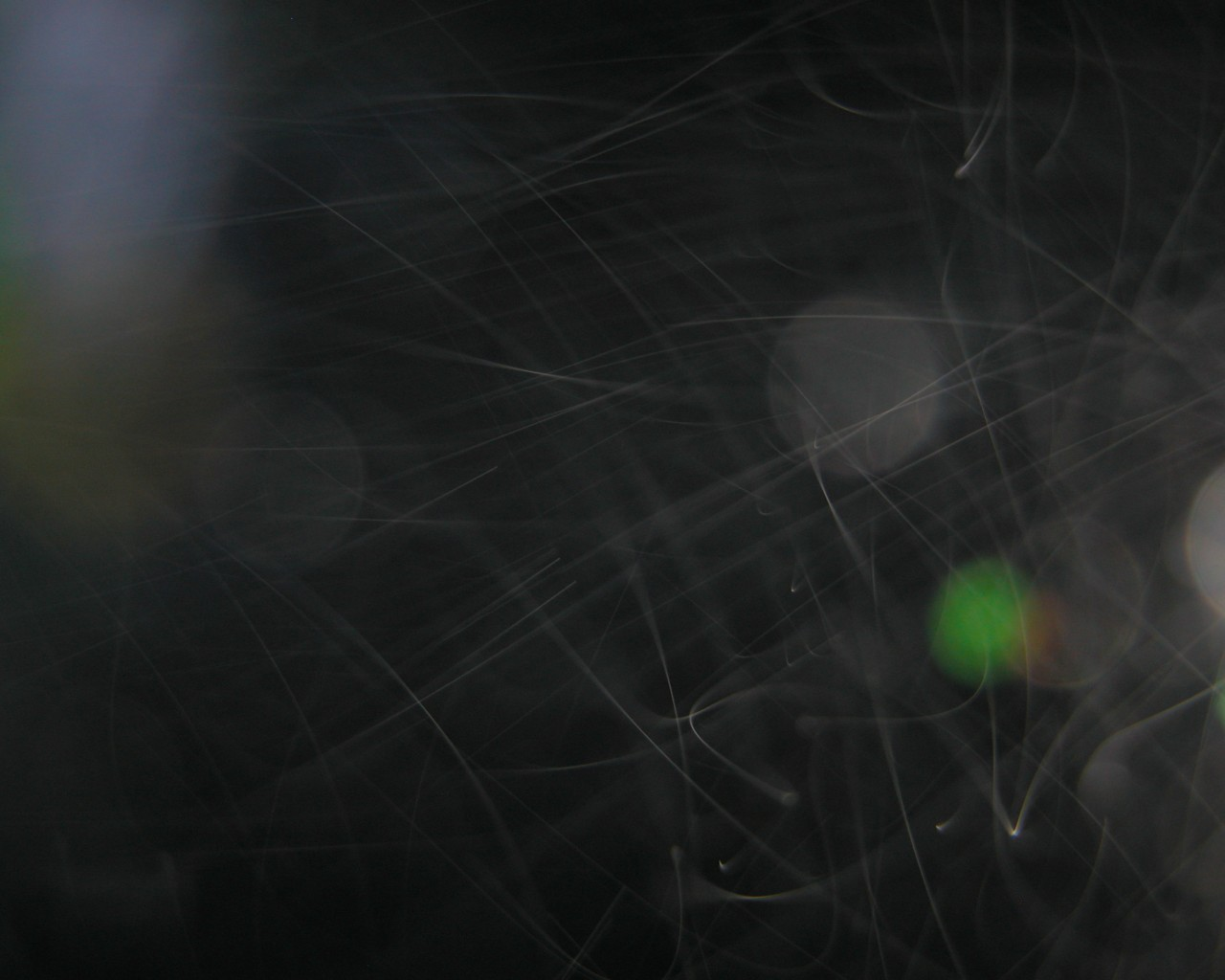
Minute droplets of water constitute this after-dark radiation fog, with an ambient temperature of −2 °C (28 °F). Their motion trails are captured as streaks.

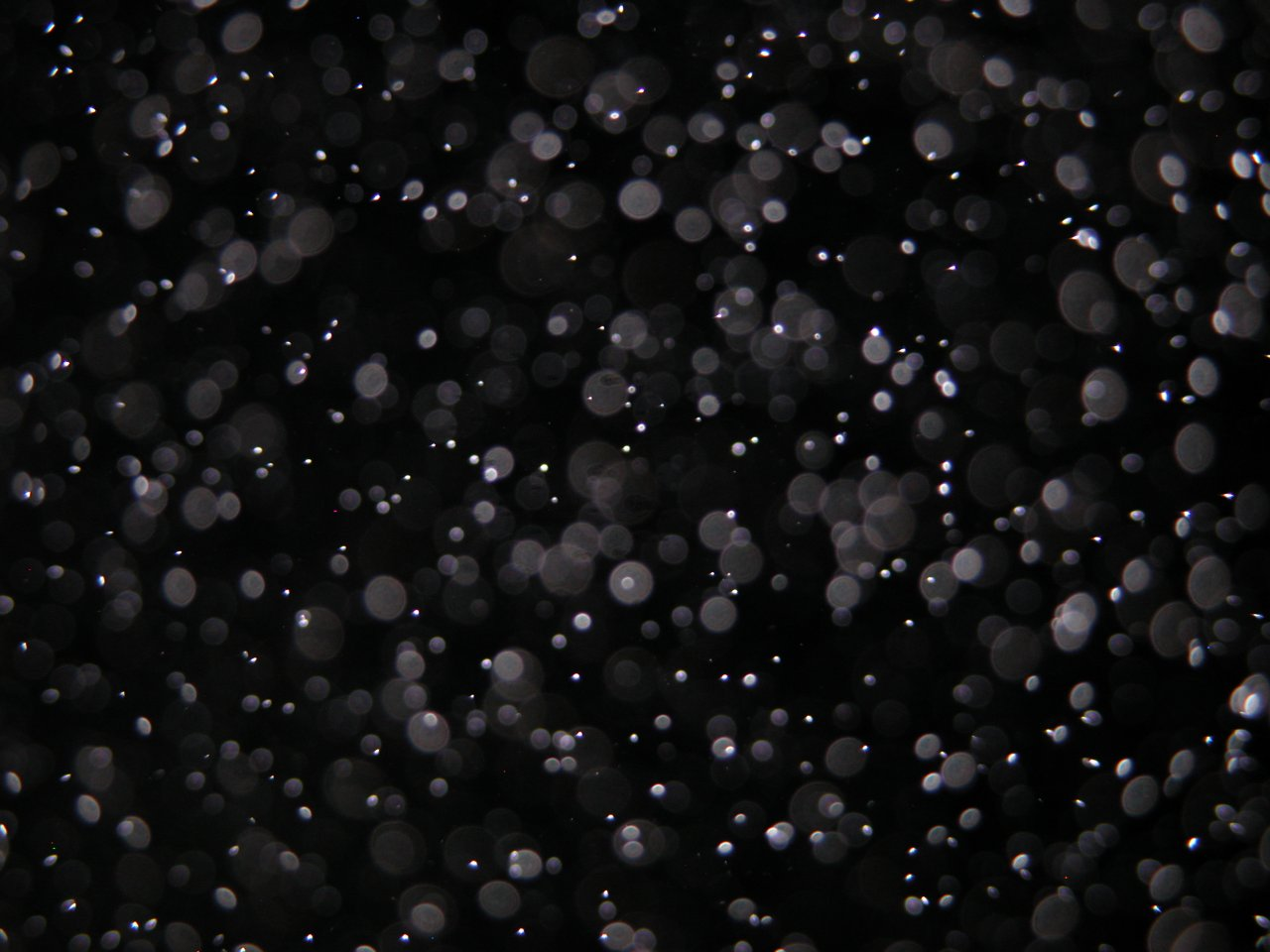
A close-up view of water droplets forming fog. Those outside the camera lens's depth of field appear as orbs.

Fog forms when the difference between air temperature and dew point is less than 2.5 °C (4.5 °F). Fog begins to form when water vapor condenses into tiny water droplets that are suspended in the air. Some examples of ways that water vapor is condensed include wind convergence into areas of upward motion; precipitation or virga falling from above; daytime heating evaporating water from the surface of oceans, water bodies, or wet land; transpiration from plants; cool or dry air moving over warmer water; and lifting air over mountains. Water vapor normally begins to condense on condensation nuclei such as dust, ice, and salt in order to form clouds. Fog, like its elevated cousin stratus, is a stable cloud deck which tends to form when a cool, stable air mass is trapped underneath a warm air mass.

Fog normally occurs at a relative humidity near 100%. This occurs from either added moisture in the air, or falling ambient air temperature. However, fog can form at lower humidities and can sometimes fail to form with relative humidity at 100%. At 100% relative humidity, the air cannot hold additional moisture, thus the air will become supersaturated if additional moisture is added.

Fog commonly produces precipitation in the form of drizzle or very light snow. Drizzle occurs when the humidity attains 100% and the minute cloud droplets begin to coalesce into larger droplets. This can occur when the fog layer is lifted and cooled sufficiently, or when it is forcibly compressed from above by descending air. Drizzle becomes freezing drizzle when the temperature at the surface drops below the freezing point.

The thickness of a fog layer is largely determined by the altitude of the inversion boundary, which in coastal or oceanic locales is also the top of the marine layer, above which the air mass is warmer and drier. The inversion boundary varies its altitude primarily in response to the weight of the air above it, which is measured in terms of atmospheric pressure. The marine layer, and any fog-bank it may contain, will be "squashed" when the pressure is high and conversely may expand upwards when the pressure above it is lowering.

== Fog microbiome and ecology ==
While the atmosphere has long been known to transport microorganisms, research on overland radiation fogs demonstrates that fog droplets serve as an active microhabitat. Fog water contains bacterial concentrations similar to those in continental or marine bodies of water.

The composition of the fog microbiome is different from the dry aerosol microbiome. It is enriched with specific bacterial taxa, most notably by pink-pigmented, photoheterotrophic Methylobacterium species. The fog water bacteria have also been found to increase in cell volume and exhibit higher rates of active cell division compared to those in dry air, indicating in situ biological growth. Following the dissipation of fog, the concentration of these bacteria in the local aerobiome can increase by an average of 45%.

== Types ==
Fogs are classified into several types based on the process that formed them.

Radiation fog is formed by the cooling of Earth's surface and lower atmosphere after sunset, in clear and calm conditions. The ground reradiates heat absorbed during the day, cooling due to heat loss. The cooling ground then cools adjacent air by conduction, causing the air temperature to fall and be cooler than the air immediately above it, a condition known as an inversion. When the air underneath the inversion layer is sufficiently humid and reaches the dew point, fog will form. Moderate to strong wind tends to prevent fog formation by circulating the air and preventing the cooling effect. Extensive fog is most likely to form in a slight breeze, as turbulence can spread the cooled surface air. This can produce a layer of fog several hundred feet in depth, above which the air remains warm. Low thermal conductivity of soil also contributes to the formation of radiation fog by limiting the upward flow of heat to the surface and allowing the radiative cooling process to dominate. High soil moisture can increase the humidity just above the ground, contributing to fog formation. Radiation fog most often occurs over swampy terrain and in valleys where cold air flows in and collects at the bottom. It usually covers a wide area, however can not form over a water surface. Radiation fog forms mostly at night but formation often begins in the late afternoon. Radiation fog is thickest shortly after sunrise, when the sun's energy increases air turbulence and therefore thicker fog, before it is strong enough to evaporate fog droplets into warmed air. During summer, longer days mean that the Earth's surface is heated to a greater degree and there is less opportunity for radiative cooling to occur. Additionally, there is less moisture in the surface of the soil. Radiation fog usually occurs in late autumn and winter, in colder conditions with longer nights. Radiation fog can persist all day in the winter months especially in areas bounded by high ground. An example of radiation fog is tule fog.

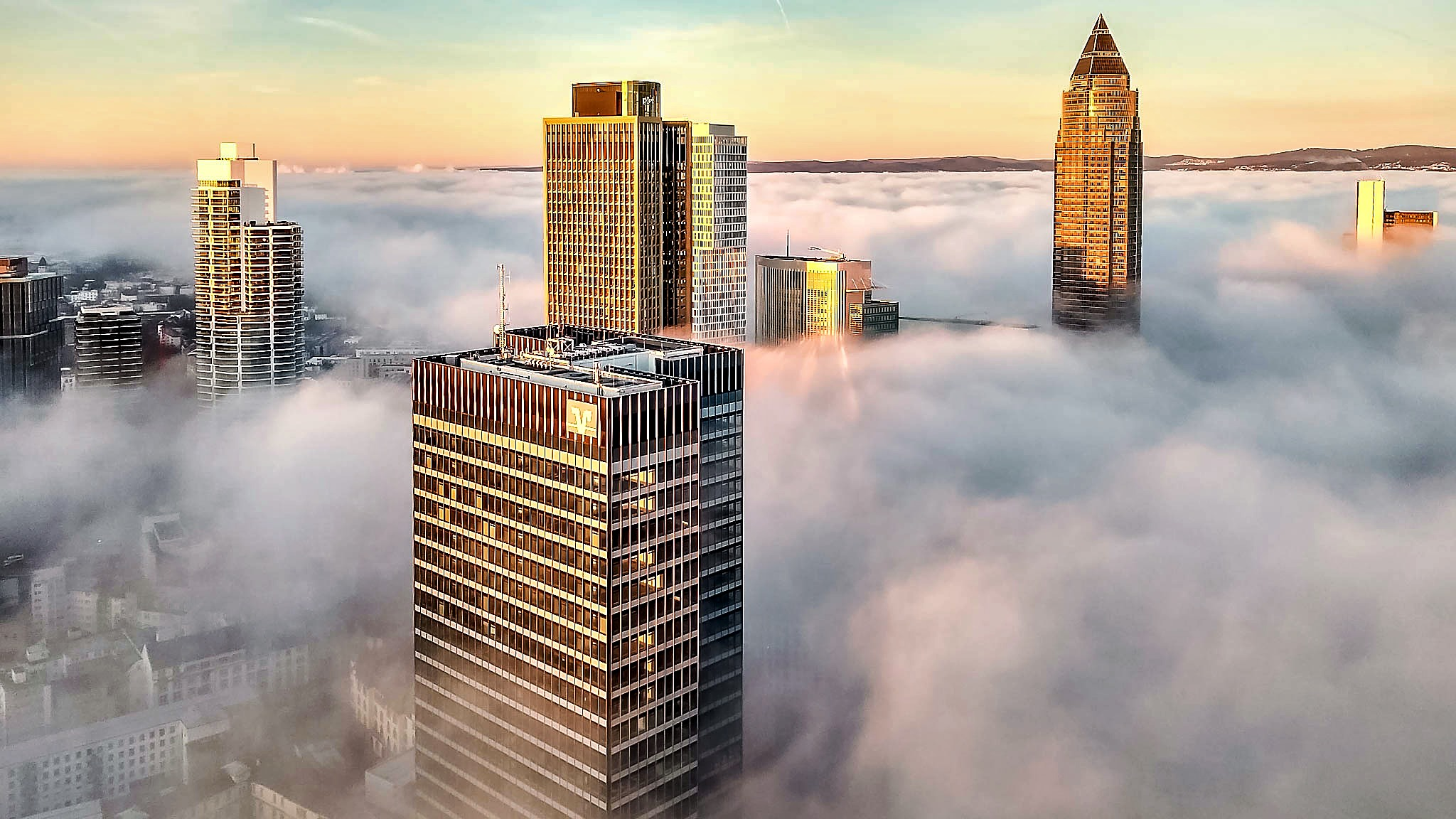
Ground fog in Frankfurt, Germany.

Ground fog is fog that obscures less than 60% of the sky and does not extend to the base of any overhead clouds. However, the term is usually a synonym for shallow radiation fog; in some cases the depth of the fog is on the order of tens of centimetres over certain kinds of terrain with the absence of wind.

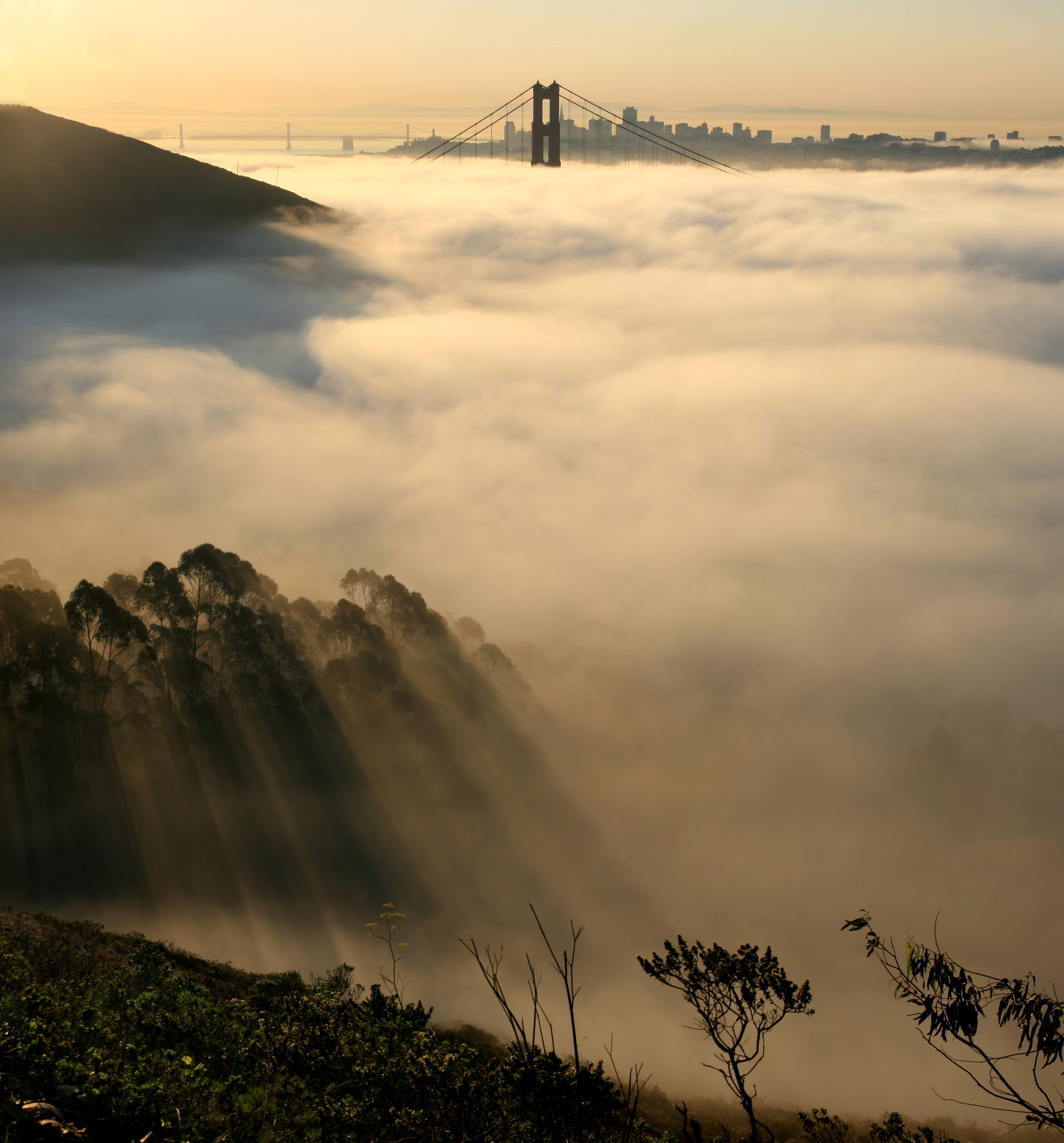
Advection fog layer in San Francisco with the Golden Gate Bridge and skyline in the background

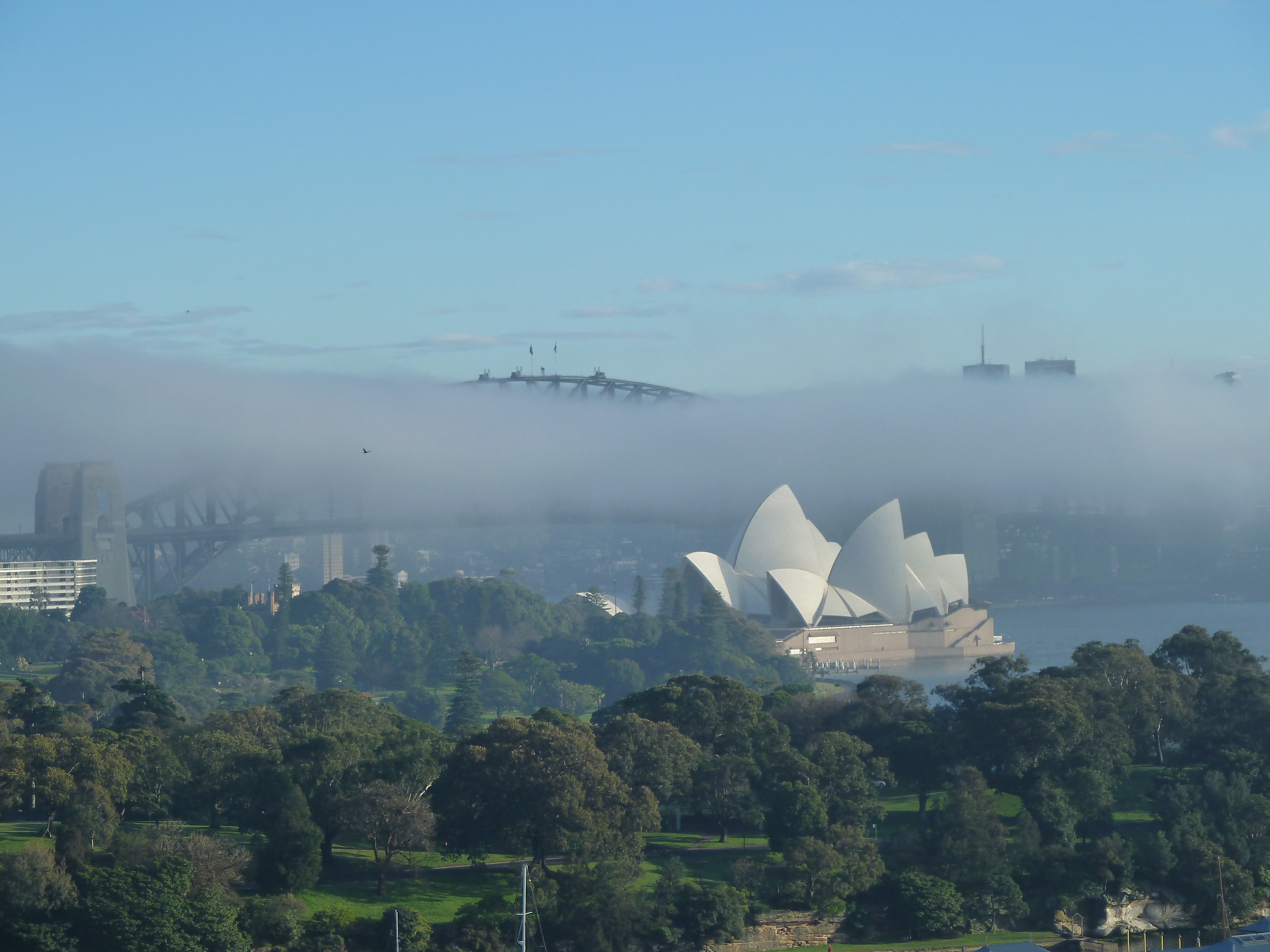
Advection fog over Sydney Harbour and the Sydney Opera House, Australia

Advection fog occurs when moist air passes over a cool surface by advection (wind) and is cooled. It is common as a warm front passes over an area with significant snow-pack. It is most common at sea when moist air encounters cooler waters, including areas of cold water upwelling, such as along the California coast. A strong enough temperature difference over water or bare ground can also cause advection fog.

Although strong winds often mix the air and can disperse, fragment, or prevent many kinds of fog, markedly warmer and humid air blowing over a snowpack can continue to generate advection fog at elevated velocities up to 80 km/h (50 mph) or more – this fog will be in a turbulent, rapidly moving, and comparatively shallow layer, observed as a few centimetres/inches in depth over flat farm fields, flat urban terrain and the like, and/or form more complex forms where the terrain is different such as rotating areas in the lee of hills or large buildings and so on.

Fog formed by advection along the California coastline is propelled onto land by one of several processes. A cold front can push the marine layer coast-ward, an occurrence most typical in the spring or late fall. During the summer months, a low-pressure trough produced by intense heating inland creates a strong pressure gradient, drawing in the dense marine layer. Also, during the summer, strong high pressure aloft over the desert southwest, usually in connection with the summer monsoon, produces a south to southeasterly flow which can drive the offshore marine layer up the coastline; a phenomenon known as a "southerly surge", typically following a coastal heat spell. However, if the monsoonal flow is sufficiently turbulent, it might instead break up the marine layer and any fog it may contain. Moderate turbulence will typically transform a fog bank, lifting it and breaking it up into shallow convective clouds called stratocumulus.

Frontal fog forms in much the same way as stratus cloud near a front when raindrops, falling from relatively warm air above a frontal surface, evaporate into cooler air close to the Earth's surface and cause it to become saturated. The water vapor cools and at the dewpoint it condenses and fog forms. This type of fog can be the result of a very low frontal stratus cloud subsiding to surface level in the absence of any lifting agent after the front passes.

Hail fog sometimes occurs in the vicinity of significant hail accumulations due to decreased temperature and increased moisture leading to saturation in a very shallow layer near the surface. It most often occurs when there is a warm, humid layer atop the hail and when wind is light. This ground fog tends to be localized but can be extremely dense and abrupt. It may form shortly after the hail falls; when the hail has had time to cool the air and as it absorbs heat when melting and evaporating.

=== Freezing conditions ===
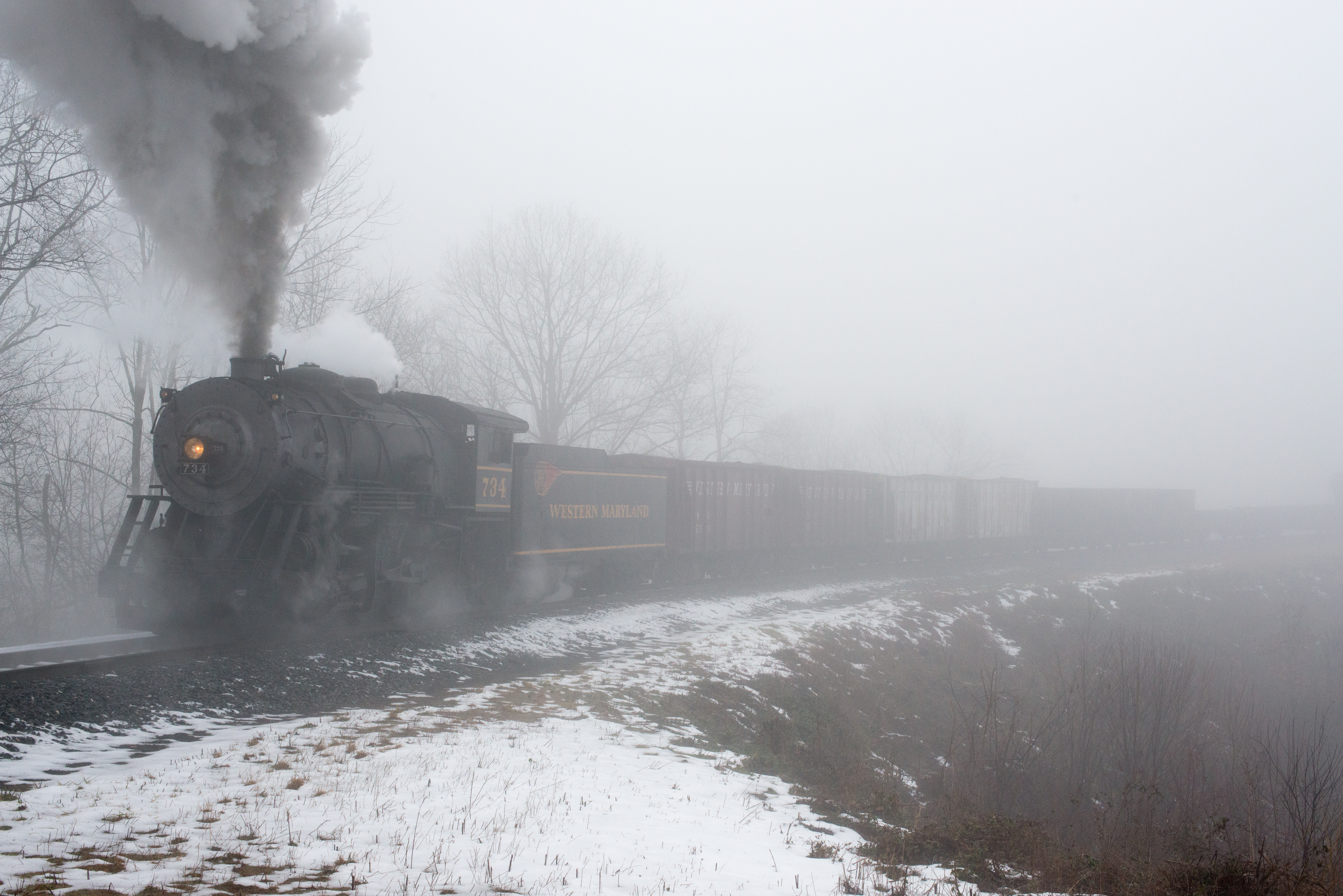
Light radiation fog over 1916-built steam locomotive No. 734 on the Western Maryland Scenic Railroad, in winter conditions

Freezing fog occurs when liquid fog droplets freeze to surfaces, forming white soft or hard rime ice. This is very common on mountain tops which are exposed to low clouds. It is equivalent to freezing rain and essentially the same as the ice that forms inside a freezer which is not of the "frostless" or "frost-free" type. The term "freezing fog" may also refer to fog where water vapor is super-cooled, filling the air with small ice crystals similar to very light snow. It seems to make the fog "tangible", as if one could "grab a handful".

Aerial video of freezing fog in the Okanagan Highlands

In the western United States, freezing fog may be referred to as pogonip. It occurs commonly during cold winter spells, usually in deep mountain valleys. The word pogonip is derived from the Shoshone word paγi̵nappi̵h, which means "cloud". In The Old Farmer's Almanac, in the calendar for December, the phrase "Beware the Pogonip" regularly appears, referring to the traditional but baseless belief that inhaling the sharp ice crystals can cause deadly damage to the lungs. In his anthology Smoke Bellew, Jack London describes a pogonip which surrounded the main characters, killing one of them.

The phenomenon is common in the inland areas of the Pacific Northwest, with temperatures in the 10 to 30 °F (−12 to −1 °C) range. The Columbia Plateau experiences this phenomenon most years during temperature inversions, sometimes lasting for as long as three weeks. The fog typically begins forming around the area of the Columbia River and expands, sometimes covering the land to distances as far away as La Pine, Oregon, almost 150 miles (240 km) due south of the river and into south central Washington.

Frozen fog (also known as ice fog) is any kind of fog where the droplets have frozen into extremely tiny crystals of ice in midair. Generally, this requires temperatures at or below −35 °C (−31 °F), making it common only in and near the Arctic and Antarctic regions. It is most often seen in urban areas where it is created by the freezing of water vapor present in automobile exhaust and combustion products from heating and power generation. Urban ice fog can become extremely dense and will persist day and night until the temperature rises. It can be associated with the diamond dust form of precipitation, in which very small crystals of ice form and slowly fall. This often occurs during blue sky conditions, which can cause many types of halos and other results of refraction of sunlight by the airborne crystals. Ice fog often leads to the visual phenomenon of light pillars.

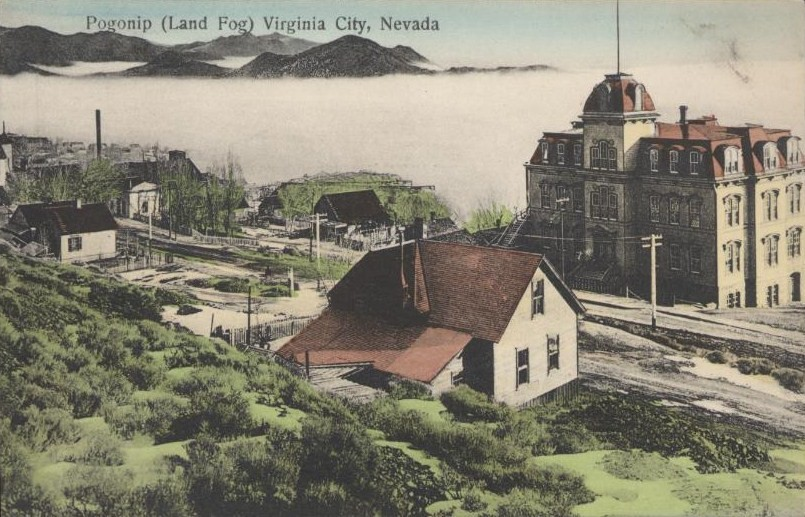
Pogonip fog in Virginia City, Nevada, from an early 20th-century postcard

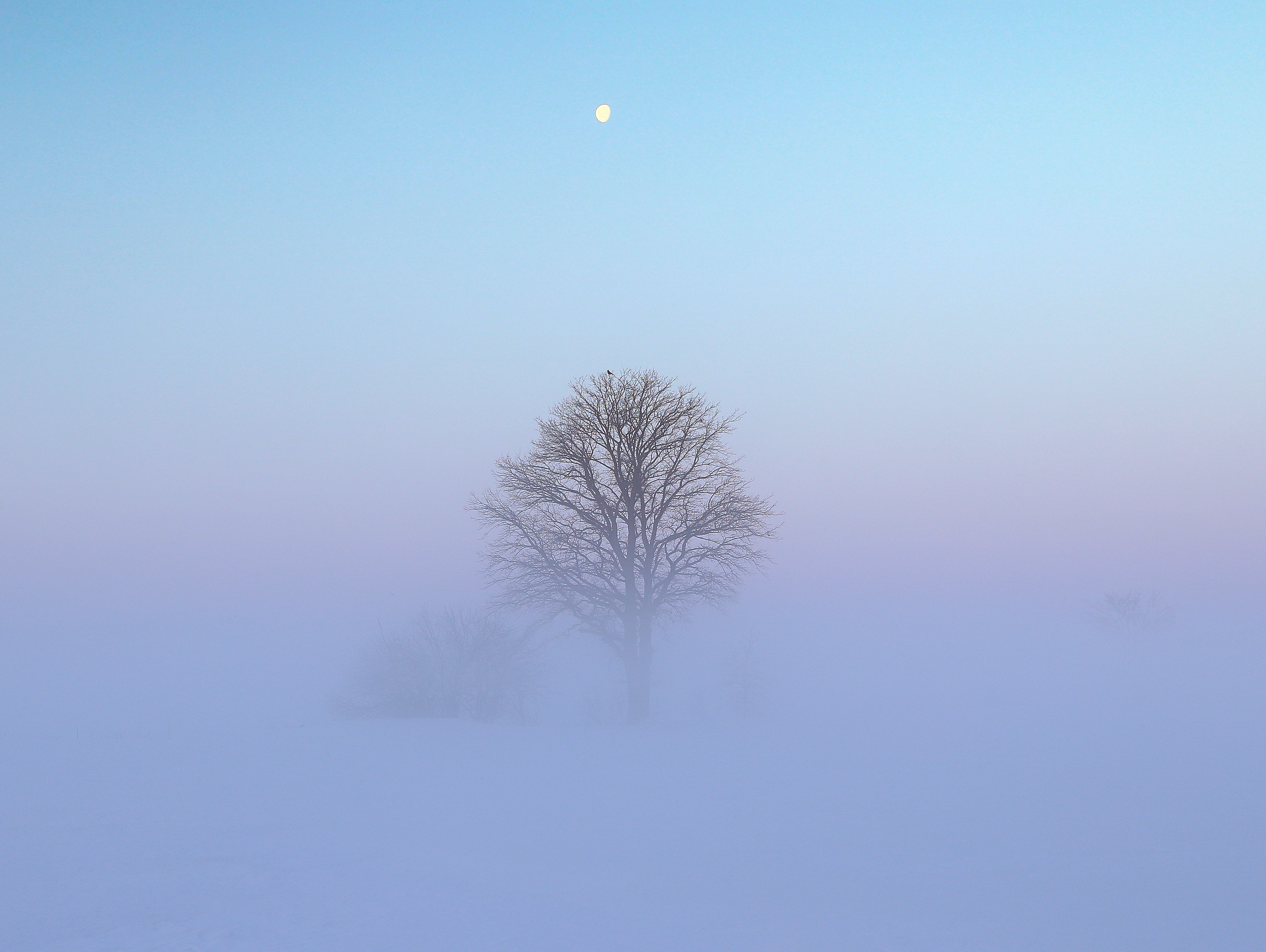
A tree in a field during extreme cold with frozen fog

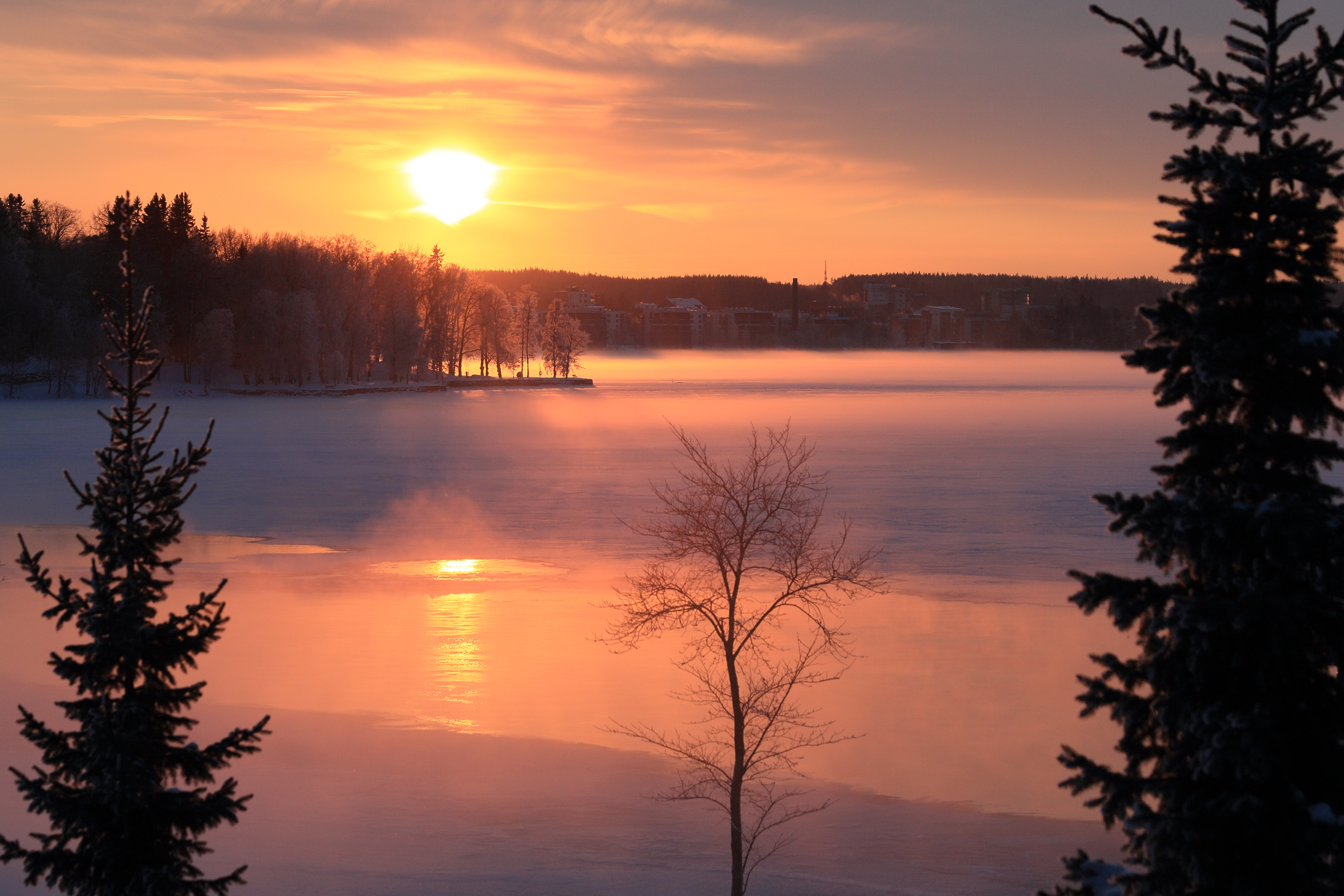
Ice fog on Pyhäjärvi, Tampere during sunset.

=== Topographical influences ===
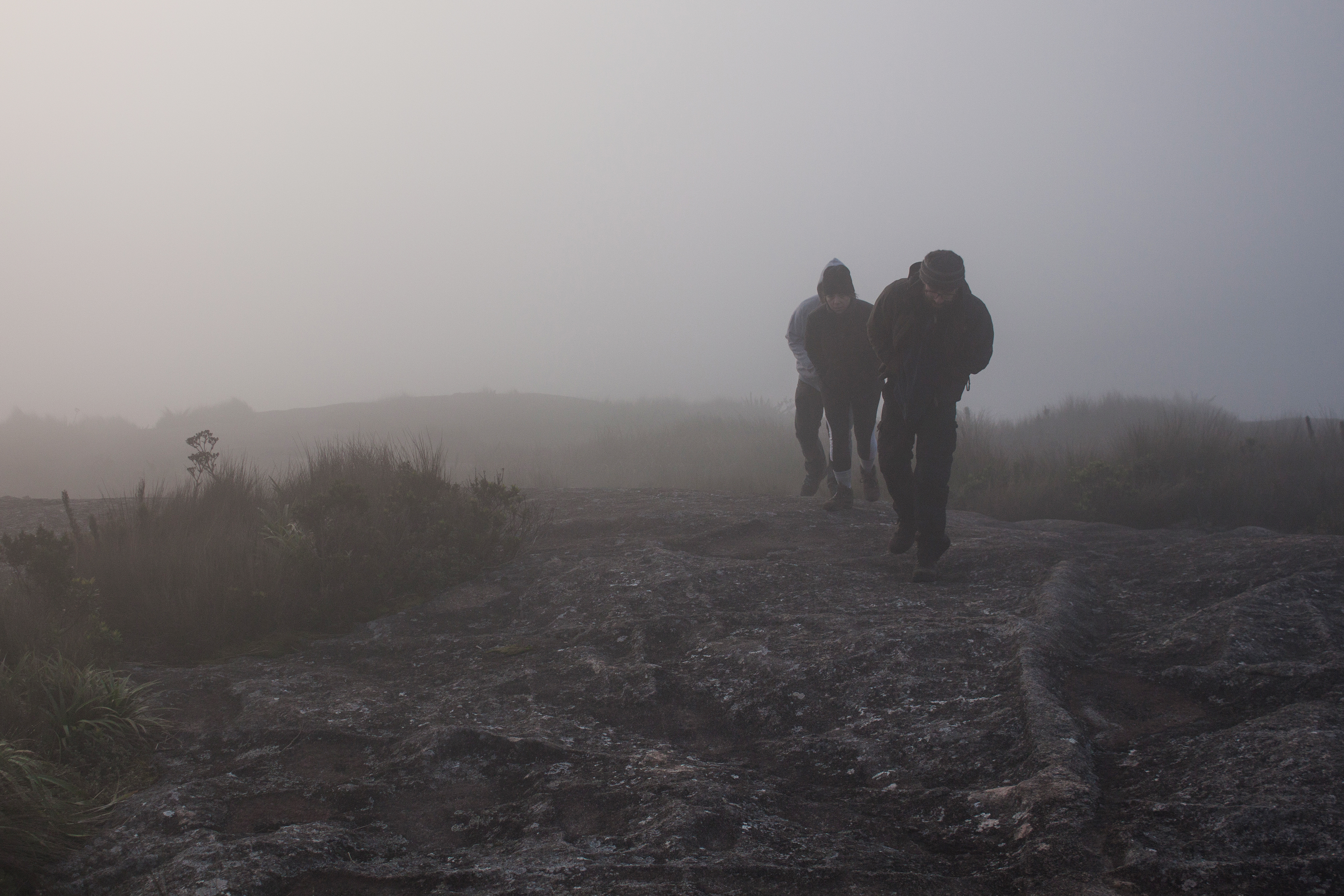
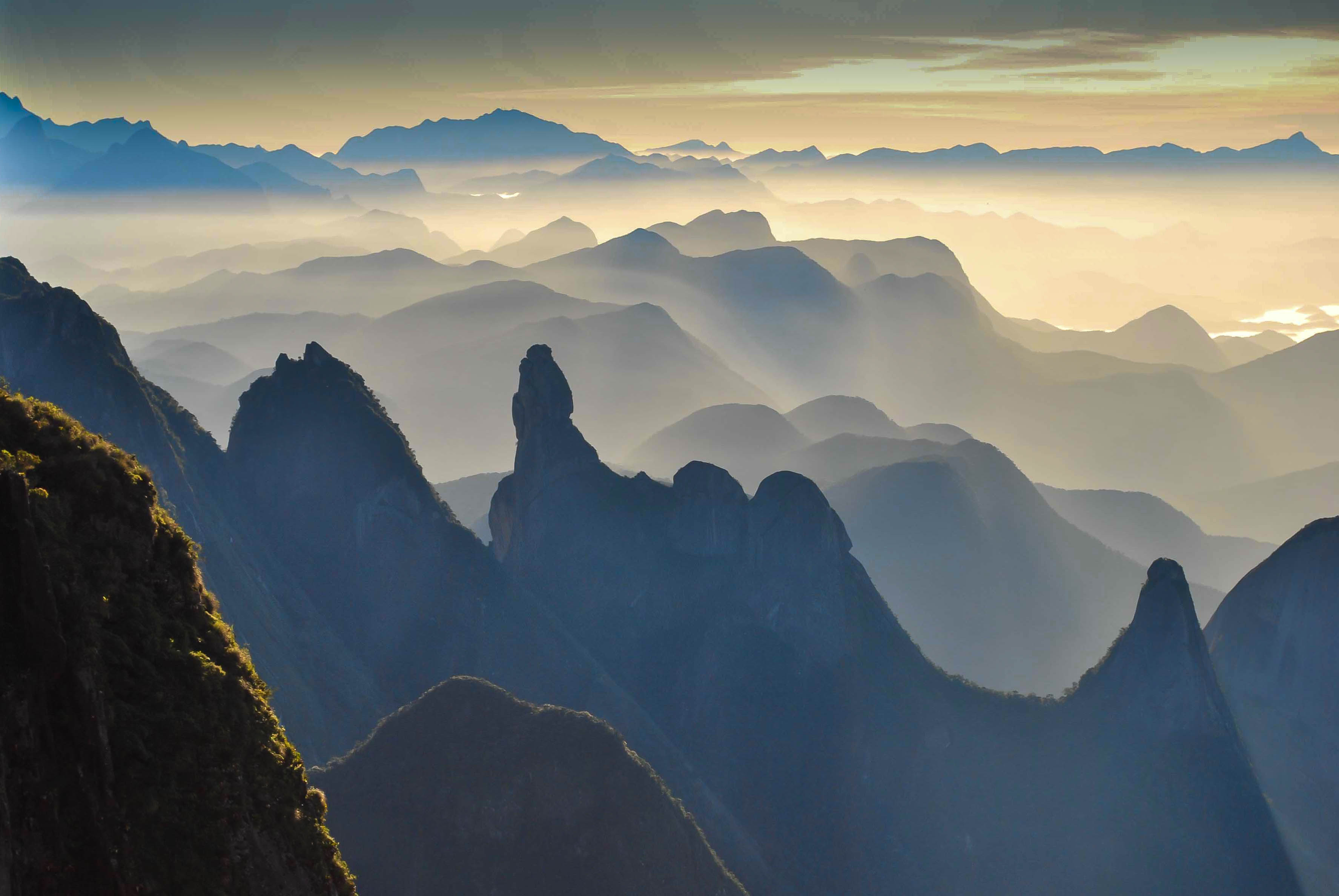
Fog over the Pedra do Sino (Bell Rock; left) and Dedo de Deus (God's Finger; right) peaks in the Serra dos Órgãos National Park, Rio de Janeiro state, Brazil

Up-slope fog or hill fog forms when winds blow air up a slope (called orographic lift), adiabatically cooling it as it rises and causing the moisture in it to condense. This often causes freezing fog on mountaintops, where the cloud ceiling would not otherwise be low enough.

Valley fog is a special case of radiation fog that forms in valleys. Pooling of cold air into valleys means fog can form more quickly and last longer, compared to over flat terrain. During winter, some valleys or basins will see fog lasting for several days in calm conditions. In California's Central Valley, valley fog is often referred to as tule fog.

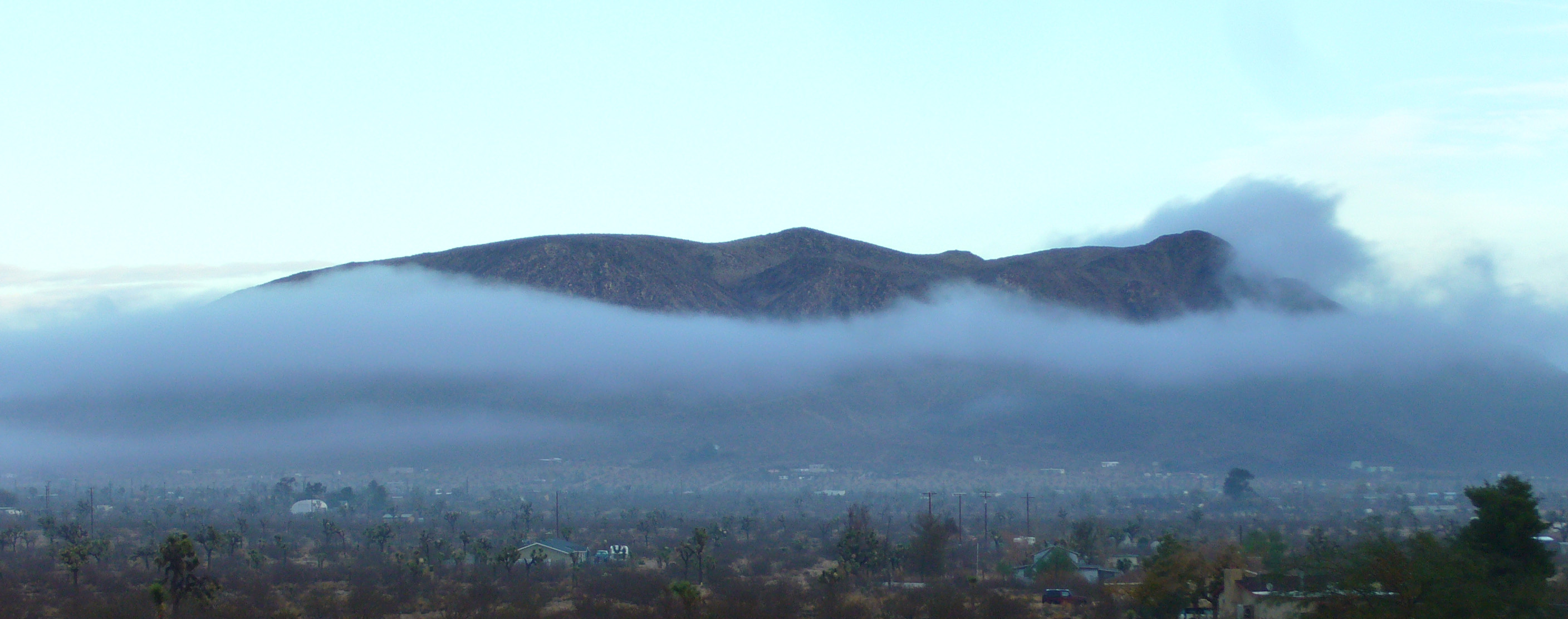
Yucca Valley, California tule fog

=== Sea and coastal areas ===
Sea fog (also known as haar or fret) is heavily influenced by the presence of sea spray and microscopic airborne salt crystals. Clouds of all types require minute hygroscopic particles upon which water vapor can condense. Over the ocean surface, the most common particles are salt from salt spray produced by breaking waves. Except in areas of storminess, the most common areas of breaking waves are located near coastlines, hence the greatest densities of airborne salt particles are there.

Condensation on salt particles has been observed to occur at humidities as low as 70%, thus fog can occur even in relatively dry air in suitable locations such as the California coast. Typically, such lower humidity fog is preceded by a transparent mistiness along the coastline as condensation competes with evaporation, a phenomenon that is typically noticeable by beachgoers in the afternoon. Another recently discovered source of condensation nuclei for coastal fog is kelp seaweed. Researchers have found that under stress (intense sunlight, strong evaporation, etc.), kelp releases particles of iodine which in turn become nuclei for condensation of water vapor, causing fog that diffuses direct sunlight.

Sea smoke, also called steam fog or evaporation fog, is created by cold air passing over warmer water or moist land. It may cause freezing fog or sometimes hoar frost. This situation can also lead to the formation of steam devils, which look like their dust counterparts. Lake-effect fog is of this type, sometimes in combination with other causes like radiation fog. It tends to differ from most advective fog formed over land in that it is (like lake-effect snow) a convective phenomenon, resulting in fog that can be very dense and deep and looks fluffy from above. Arctic sea smoke is similar to sea smoke but occurs when the air is very cold. Instead of condensing into water droplets, columns of freezing, rising, and condensing water vapor is formed. The water vapor produces the sea smoke fog and is usually misty and smoke-like.

Garúa fog near the coast of Chile and Peru occurs when typical fog produced by the sea travels inland but suddenly meets an area of hot air. This causes the water particles of fog to shrink by evaporation, producing a "transparent mist". Garua fog is nearly invisible, yet it still forces drivers to use windshield wipers because of condensation onto cooler hard surfaces. Camanchaca is a similar dense fog.

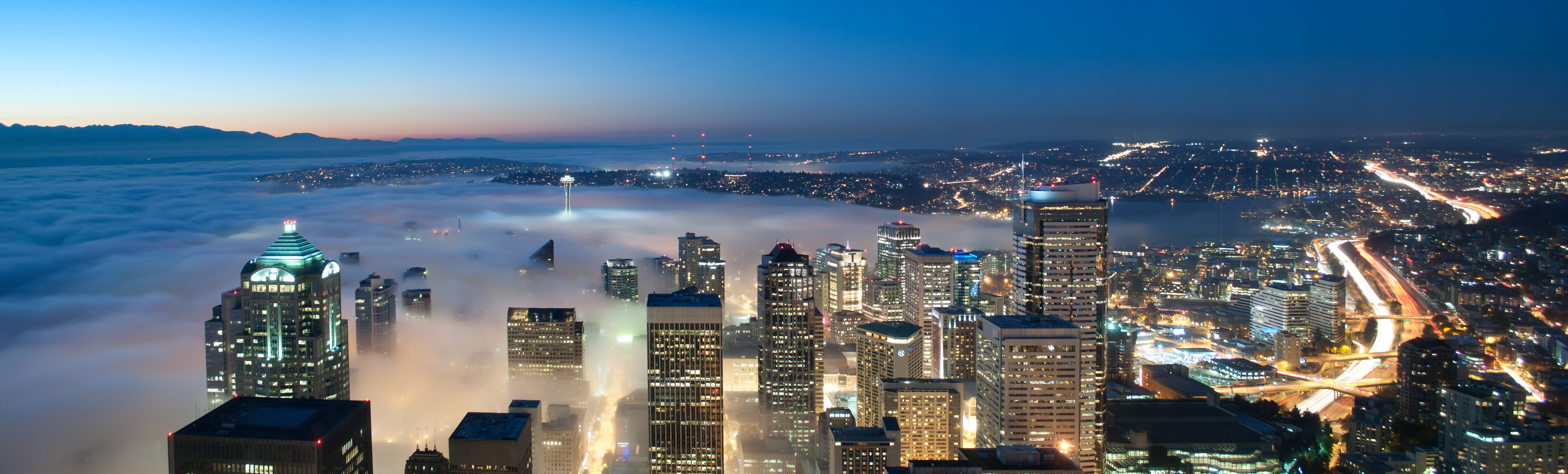
Fog rolls into Seattle from the sea

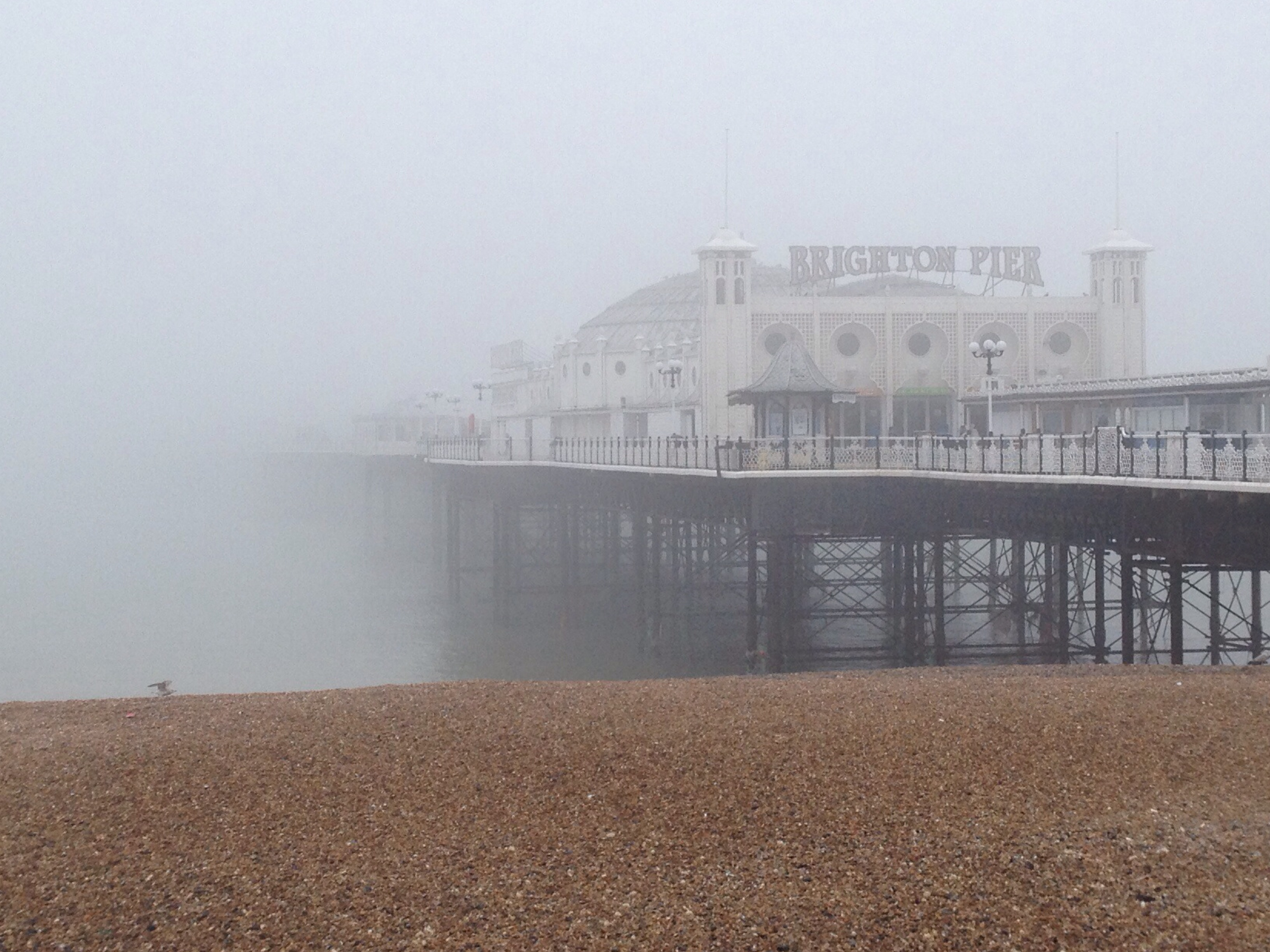
Sea fog or "fret" encroaching on Brighton Pier

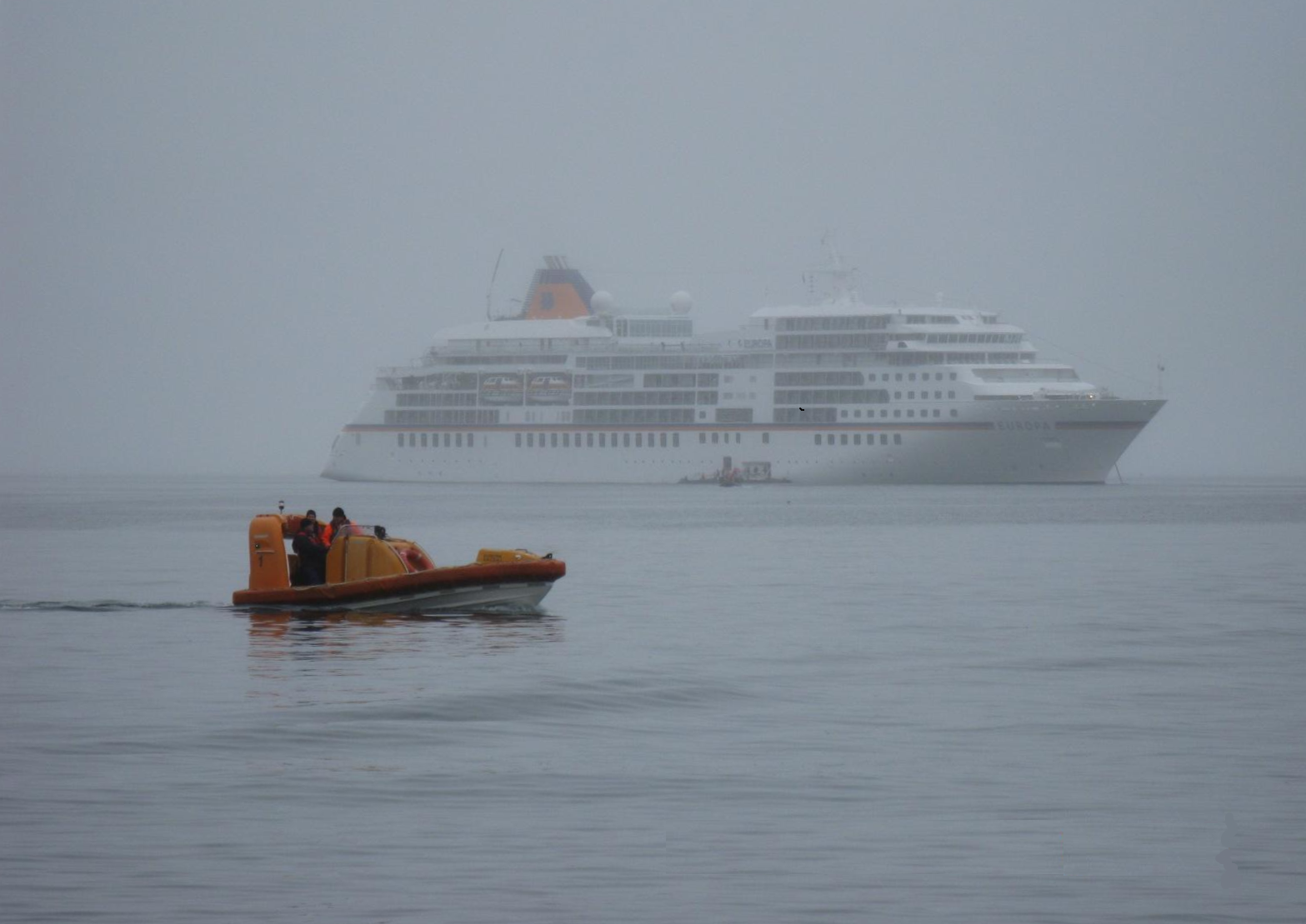
Sea fog in the Arctic Ocean near the island of Jan Mayen

== Effects ==
=== Visibility ===
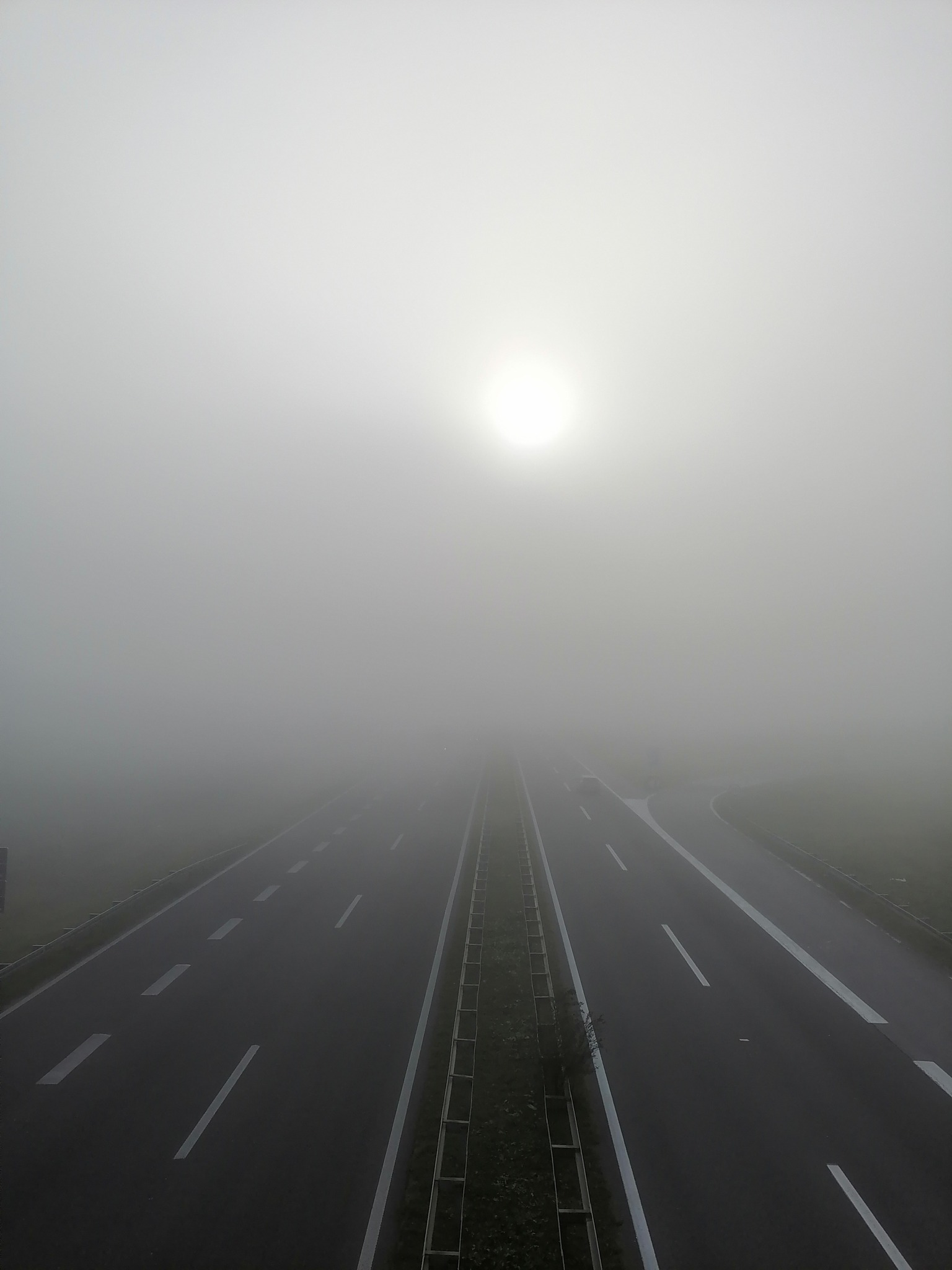
Fog in Serbia

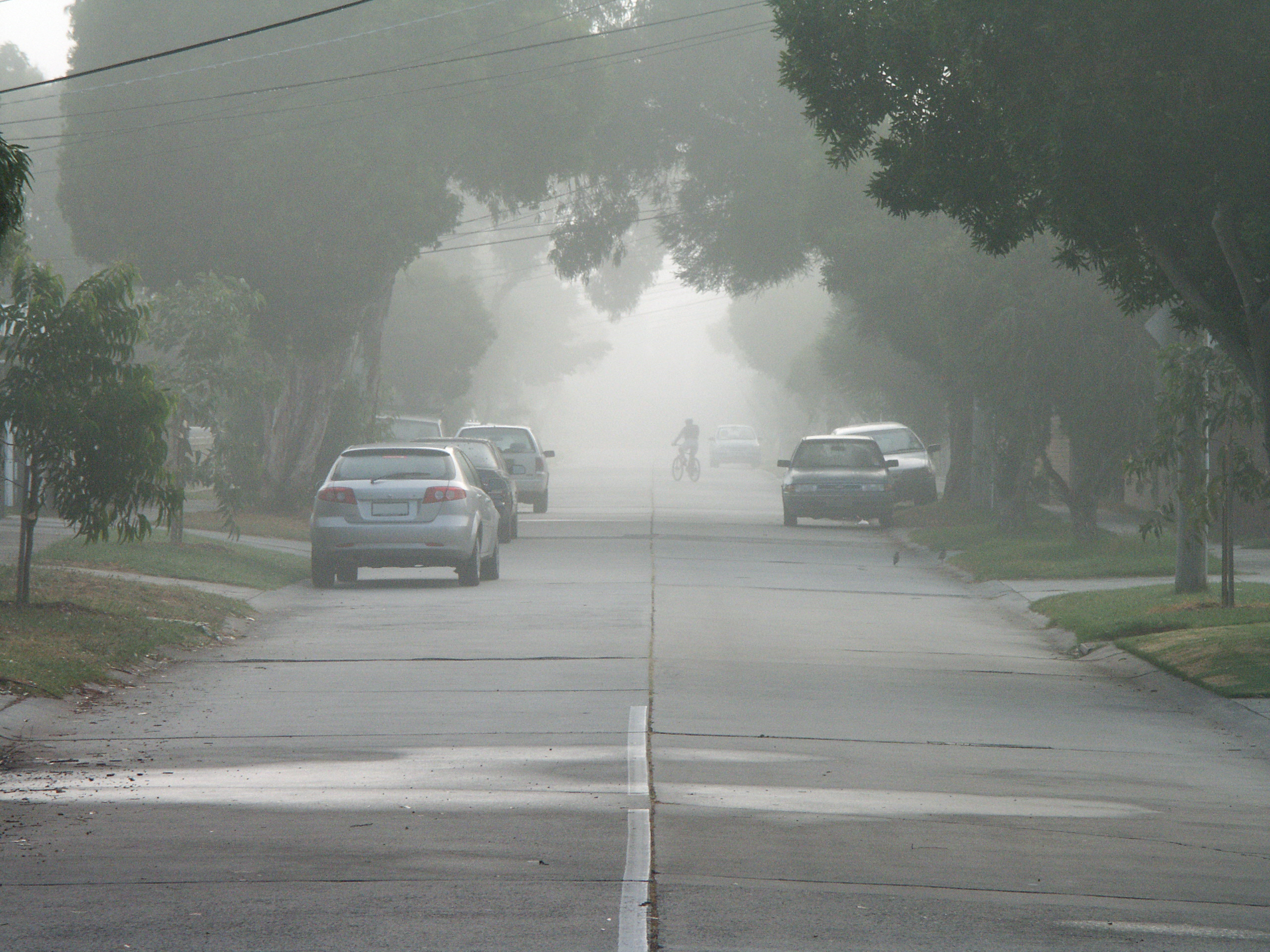
Light fog reduces visibility on a suburban street, rendering the cyclist very hazy at about 200 m (220 yd). The limit of visibility is about 400 m (440 yd), which is before the end of the street.

Depending on the concentration of the droplets, visibility in fog can range from the appearance of haze to almost zero visibility. Many lives are lost each year worldwide from accidents involving fog conditions on the highways, including multiple-vehicle collisions.

The aviation travel industry is affected by the severity of fog conditions. Even though modern auto-landing computers can put an aircraft down without the aid of a pilot, personnel manning an airport control tower must be able to see if aircraft are sitting on the runway awaiting takeoff. Safe operations are difficult in thick fog, and civilian airports may forbid takeoffs and landings until conditions improve.

A solution for landing returning military aircraft developed in World War II was called Fog Investigation and Dispersal Operation (FIDO). It involved burning enormous amounts of fuel alongside runways to evaporate fog, allowing returning fighter and bomber pilots sufficient visual cues to safely land their aircraft. The high energy demands of this method discourage its use for routine operations.

=== Shadows ===
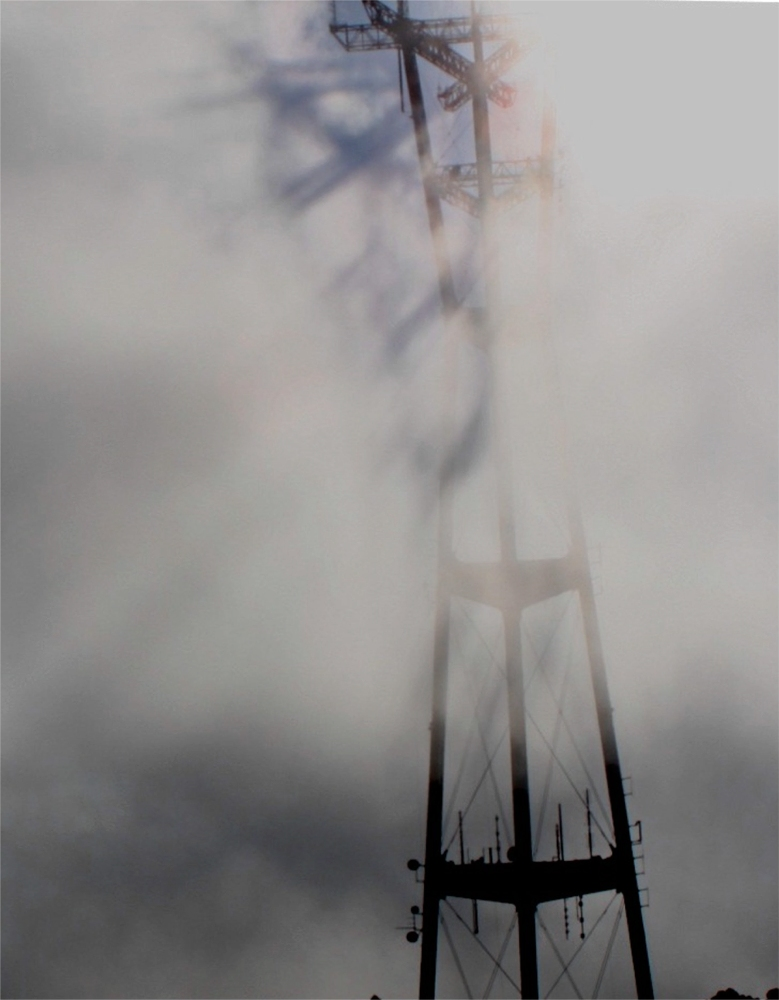
Sutro Tower casts a 3-dimensional fog shadow

Shadows are cast through fog in three dimensions. The fog is dense enough to be illuminated by light that passes through gaps in a structure or tree, but thin enough to let a large quantity of that light pass through to illuminate points further on. As a result, object shadows appear as "beams" oriented in a direction parallel to the light source. These voluminous shadows are created the same way as crepuscular rays, which are the shadows of clouds. In fog, it is solid objects that cast shadows.

=== Sound propagation and acoustics ===
Sound typically travels fastest and farthest through solids, then liquids, then gases such as the atmosphere. Sound is affected during fog conditions due to the small distances between water droplets, and air temperature differences.

Though fog is essentially liquid water, the many droplets are separated by small air gaps. High-pitched sounds have a high frequency, which in turn means they have a short wavelength. To transmit a high frequency wave, air must move back and forth very quickly. Short-wavelength high-pitched sound waves are reflected and refracted by many separated water droplets, partially cancelling and dissipating their energy (a process called "damping"). In contrast, low pitched notes, with a low frequency and a long wavelength, move the air less rapidly and less often, and lose less energy to interactions with small water droplets. Low-pitched notes are less affected by fog and travel further, which is why foghorns use a low-pitched tone.

A fog can be caused by a temperature inversion where cold air is pooled at the surface which helped to create the fog, while warmer air sits above it. The inverted boundary between cold air and warm air reflects sound waves back toward the ground, allowing sound that would normally radiate out escaping into the upper atmosphere to instead bounce back and travel near the surface. A temperature inversion increases the distance that lower frequency sounds can travel, by reflecting the sound between the ground and the inversion layer.

=== Impact on atmospheric chemistry ===
The microbiome within radiation fogs plays a significant role in mitigating air pollution. The dominant Methylobacterium strains inside fog droplets specialize in metabolizing C1 carbon compounds. These microbiomes degrade atmospheric formaldehyde – a toxic pollutant and precursor to ozone smog – at rates roughly 200 times faster than rates measured in cloud water. Because high concentrations of formaldehyde are toxic to the bacteria themselves, they break down the chemical into carbon dioxide primarily as a detoxification mechanism. This indicates that fog events actively cleanse the lower atmosphere of certain toxic compounds.

== Record extremes ==
The foggiest places in the world are often areas above cold ocean currents. Most sea fogs are types of advection fog.

The Grand Banks of Newfoundland are often considered one of the foggiest places in the world. A major reason for this is its proximity to the meeting place of the cold Labrador Current from the north and the much warmer Gulf Stream from the south. It has an average of 200 or more days spent in fog each year. Other particularly foggy places include Hamilton, New Zealand, the Po Valley in Italy, on the Swiss plateau, the coastal Atacama Desert, Chile, the Namib Desert, Cape Disappointment (Washington), Point Reyes, California and Mistake Island, Maine. Additionally, the sea area around Greenland and the Kuril Islands are both known to be particularly foggy.

The least foggy areas of the US mainland are the desert areas of Arizona, California and Nevada while the foggiest are the New England and Pacific coasts. San Francisco is well known for its fog, however a decline in dense fog since the 1980s has been mostly attributed to reduced levels of air pollution.

== As a water source ==
Redwood forests in California receive approximately 30–40% of their moisture from coastal fog by way of fog drip. Change in climate patterns could result in relative drought in these areas. Along the coast of California, fog is the only source of water for plants and animals for up to 7 months of the year. Some animals, including insects, depend on wet fog as a principal source of water, particularly in otherwise arid climates like in many African coastal areas. Some coastal communities use fog nets to extract moisture from the atmosphere where groundwater pumping and rainwater collection are insufficient.

While fog harvesting is traditionally viewed in some locales as a sustainable uncontaminated freshwater supply. Certain studies suggest fogs are active microhabitats with dense bacterial populations, with some bacteria (like Methylobacterium) that can potentially be opportunistic pathogens. Other than that, harvesting could have unintended side effects, since fog has been found to detoxify the atmosphere.

== Artificial fog ==
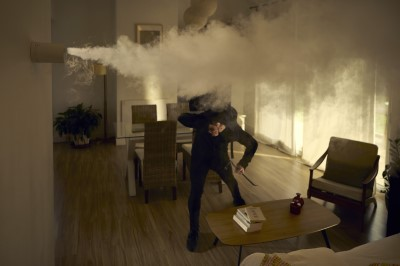
An artificial opacifying fog triggered remotely to scare off burglars.

Artificial fog is man-made fog that is usually created by vaporizing a water- and glycol- or glycerine-based fluid. The fluid is injected into a heated metal block which evaporates quickly. The resulting pressure forces the vapor out of a vent. Upon coming into contact with cool outside air, the vapor condenses in microscopic droplets and appears as fog. Such fog machines are commonly used for entertainment applications.

== Historical references ==
The presence of fog has often played a key role in historical events, such as strategic battles. One example is the 1776 Battle of Long Island when American General George Washington and his command were able to evade imminent capture by the British Army, using fog to conceal their escape. Another example is D-Day (6 June 1944) during World War II, when the Allies landed on the beaches of Normandy, France during fog conditions. Both positive and negative results were reported from both sides during that battle, due to impaired visibility.

== See also ==
=== Technology ===
- Anti-fog
- Automotive lighting
- Decontamination foam
- Fog Investigation and Dispersal Operation (FIDO)
- Fog collection
- Fogging (photography)
- Fog lamp
- Head-up display
- Runway visual range
- Transmissometer

=== Weather ===
- Fog season
- Smoke
- Smog
- Whiteout (weather)
- Vog
