= Kyle Boelte =

American essayist and author

- Born: Kansas, US
- Writing career
- Language: English
- Genre: Nonfiction
- Notable work: The Beautiful Unseen
- Website: www.kyleboelte.com

Kyle Boelte is an American essayist and author. He was born in a small town in Western Kansas and grew up near Denver, Colorado.

Boelte's book The Beautiful Unseen: Variations on Fog and Forgetting is about his brother's suicide, when they were both teenagers, as well as San Francisco fog. The book received positive reviews in The San Francisco Chronicle ("one of the most haunting books ever written about the fragility of memory"), The Los Angeles Review of Books ("Boelte’s sure-footed prose makes The Beautiful Unseen a lovely journey"), and Booklist ("Boelte conveys the deep, abiding sense of loss such tragedies inflict, yet softly, tenderly communicates the conflicting sensations of confronting memories, both lost and found"). Its major themes include the impermanence of memory and the importance of nature, including wilderness, in our lives.

Boelte's essays have been published in Zyzzyva, High Country News, and Full Stop. He was a finalist for the Annie Dillard Award for Creative Nonfiction in 2013. His essay "Reluctant Citizens" was included in "The Best American Nonrequired Reading 2016" and was cited as a Notable Essay in "The Best American Essays 2016".

== Bibliography ==
- Kyle Boelte (2015) The Beautiful Unseen: Variations on Fog and Forgetting. Soft Skull Press. ISBN 978-1619024588
