= San Francisco fog =

Common weather phenomenon in San Francisco

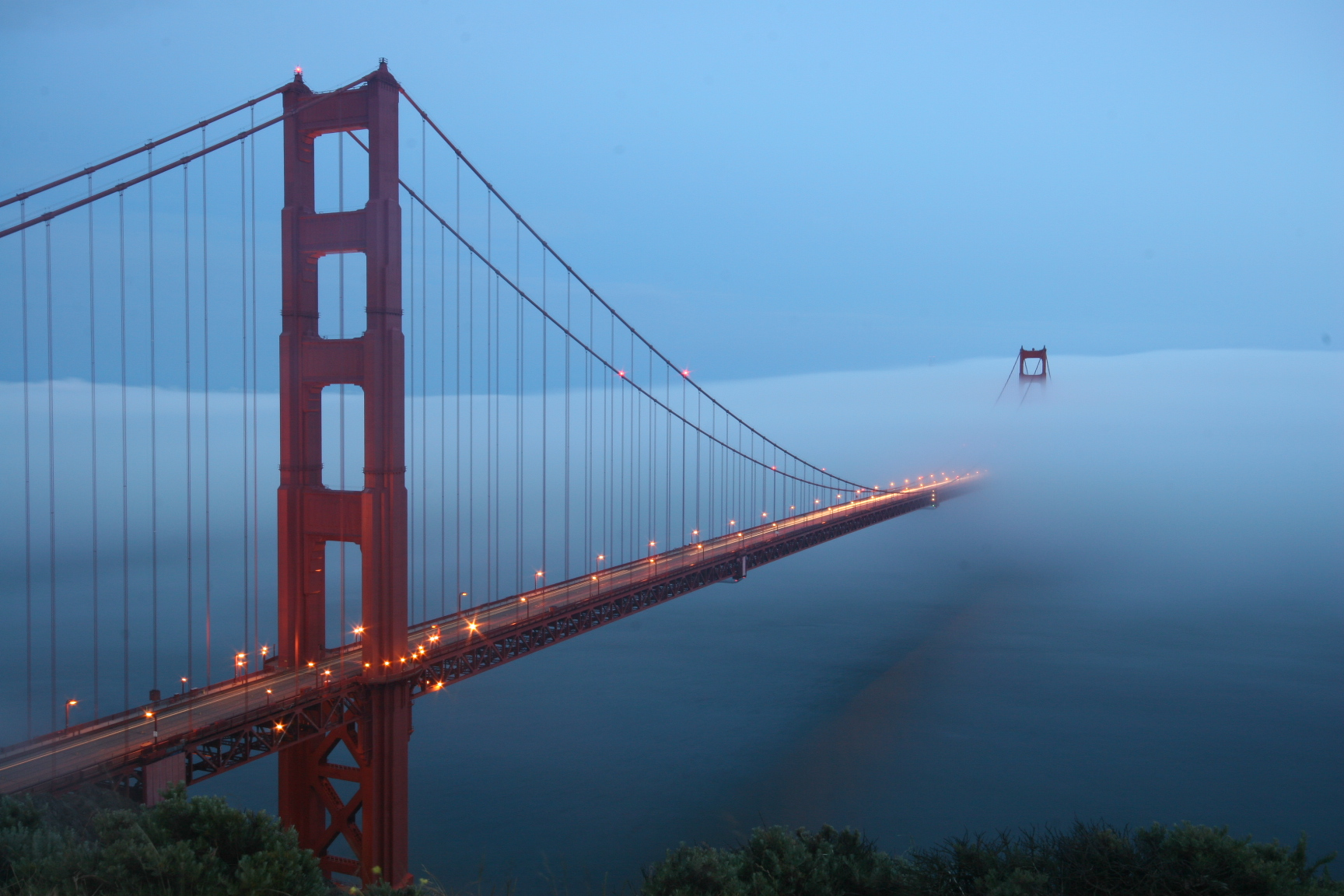
Fog over the Golden Gate Bridge (May 2009)

Fog is a common weather phenomenon in the San Francisco Bay Area and the entire coastline of California extending south to the northwest coast of the Baja California Peninsula. The frequency of fog and low-lying stratus clouds is due to a combination of factors particular to the region that are especially prevalent in the summer. Another type of fog, tule fog, can occur during the winter. There are occasions when both types can coincide in the Bay Area. Some studies suggest that the prevalence of fog in the San Francisco Bay Area has decreased since 1951; however, some suggest these data are insufficient, or even suggest contrary results. Decreases in fog, if occurring, are likely due to climate change and anthropogenic change (such as increased urbanization and decreasing air pollution).

== Ocean moisture ==
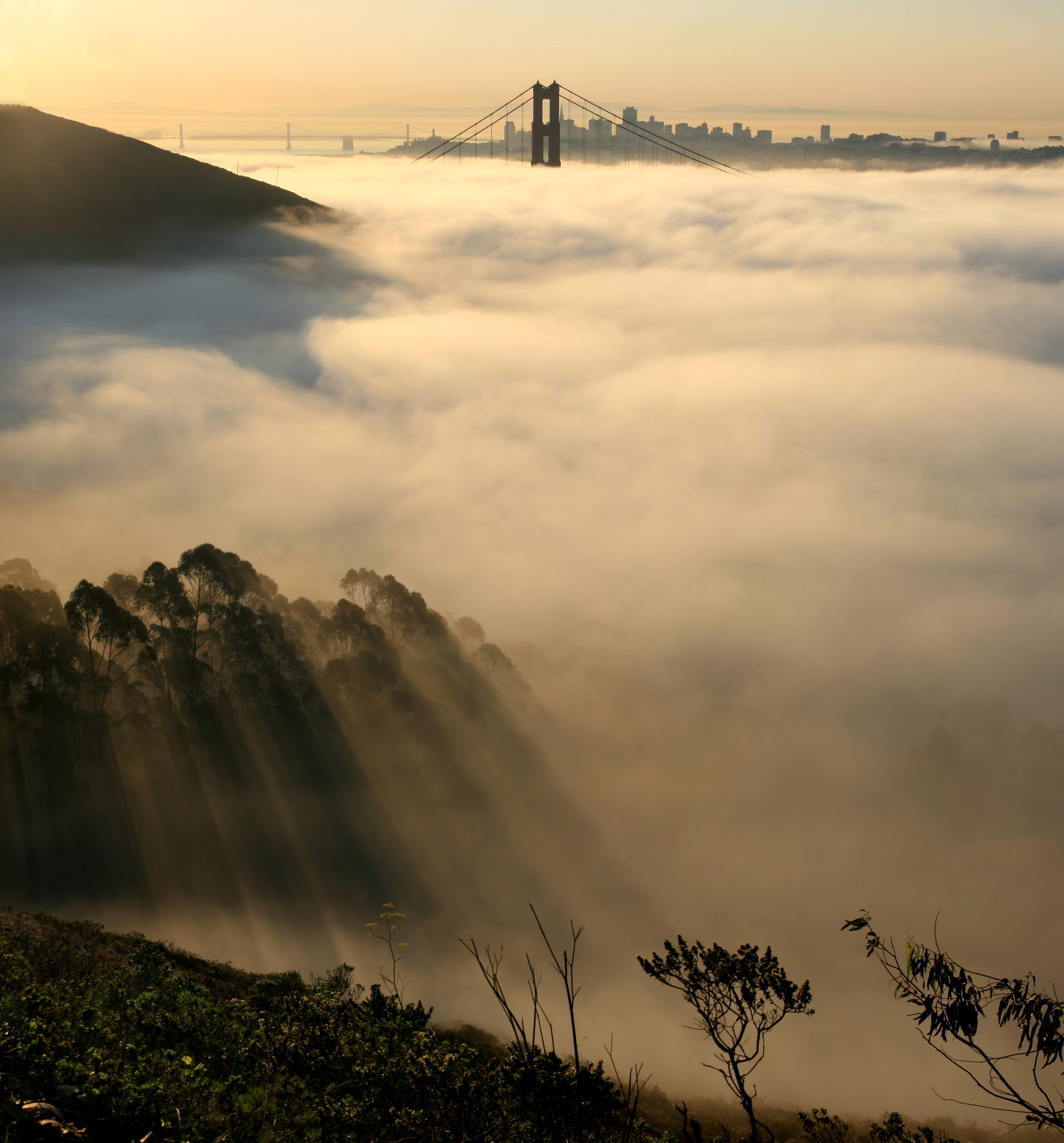
Fog outside the Golden Gate

The Pacific Ocean contributes to the frequency of fog by providing atmospheric moisture and temperature. It is also the primary source of nuclei for the condensation of moisture from vapor into cloud droplets. Moisture evaporated from the ocean surface over hundreds, even thousands of miles of the open Pacific is carried to California from various directions. This water vapor contributes to the development of a marine layer near the ocean surface.

Along the California coast, the prevailing current flows from the northwest and is cool owing to its origin in the North Pacific. Additional cooling occurs due to strong upwelling of cooler subsurface waters, especially along the immediate coastline and near various promontories. Sea surface temperatures along the coast are generally 52–58 °F (11–14 °C) year-round.

When the marine layer encounters the colder waters along the California coast, it cools to its dew point, and if small particles called condensation nuclei are present, liquid water drops will form. Condensation nuclei in coastal fog are primarily composed of salt from surf and spray, with lesser amounts of iodine from kelp. These nuclei are so effective that condensation can occur even before the relative humidity reaches 100%.

== Land/sea temperature gradient ==
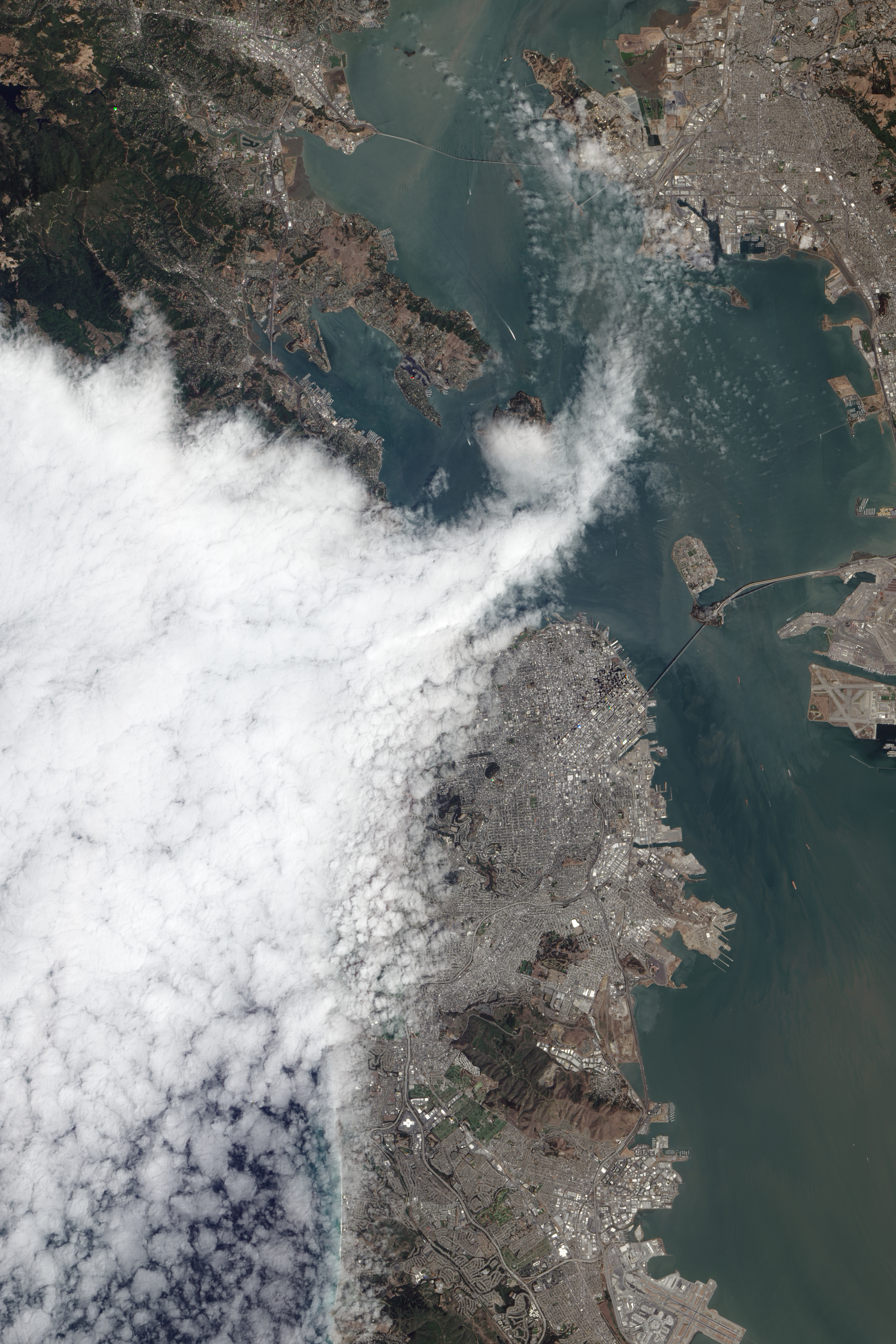
Fog enters San Francisco Bay through the Golden Gate, seen here in August 2012

The prevailing wind along the California coast is from the northwest owing to the typical location of the North Pacific High, a large area of high atmospheric pressure. As the coastline is oriented from northwest to southeast, the marine layer and any clouds present within it would be confined to the coast and adjacent offshore waters, and often are, but for the large difference in temperature between the coastal waters and the inland valleys, especially the Central Valley. In the summer, inland temperatures can soar above 100 °F (38 °C). This significant difference creates a strong pressure gradient that turns the prevailing northwest flow to a westerly and even southwesterly direction near the coastline, driving the marine layer and its clouds onshore and through any gaps in the Coast Ranges.

The largest coastal gap is the Golden Gate at the entrance to San Francisco Bay which also communicates via the Bay with the Carquinez Strait and the Central Valley. As the city of San Francisco lies adjacent to the Golden Gate, it is often subject to the fog and low clouds blowing in on the marine layer. Even when the clouds are not present, the coolness of the marine layer exacerbated by the strong winds can chill the city even in mid-summer. Due to this, San Francisco is sometimes described as "naturally air-conditioned".

Under normal summertime conditions, a daily pattern of fog and low clouds occurs. Morning sunlight heats the ground (cloud-penetrating visible light wavelengths transformed to infrared by the ground), which heats the marine layer over the land areas. This creates convective turbulence within the marine layer and evaporation of any clouds within it. The marine layer clears back toward the coast, usually by noon. By mid-afternoon, inland areas have heated sufficiently to decrease the air pressure and increase the onshore flow. By late afternoon, the wind increases and begins to cool the onshore marine layer, allowing the fog and low clouds offshore to progress inland without evaporating. Cloudiness streams in over the Bay and through the various gaps. The distance the clouds can penetrate inland depends on the depth of the marine layer and the strength of the cooling winds. As night falls and inland areas cool down, the winds usually decrease, but the fog and clouds remain wherever they have blown in until the following morning when the cycle repeats.

== Variations ==
A land/sea temperature-pressure gradient is not always necessary to drive the marine layer and low clouds onshore into the Bay Area. Winds ahead of an approaching cold front or low-pressure system can also push the marine layer onshore.

Another pattern variation occurs with heat spells that reach the coast from inland. Such heat waves typically occur when an area of high atmospheric pressure orients itself so that the north to northeast gradient becomes dominant, driving the marine layer out to sea south and west of the California coast. These spells typically end with what is called a southerly surge, when the northerly gradient relaxes, allowing the marine layer to "slosh back" up the coastline.

Yet another variation occurs when the upper air becomes turbulent. Turbulence above the marine layer inversion can, depending on its severity, break up the marine layer. The most common causes of such turbulence are strong upper-level low pressure areas, or the monsoon, a seasonal shift in wind patterns, which occasionally extends northwestward from the desert areas of the U.S. This shift in wind can disrupt stable atmospheric conditions, causing changes in the marine layer.

There are also occasional extended spells when fog and stratus ("overcast") do not clear back to the coast for several days. These extended periods of cloudiness are usually a consequence of a weak area of low pressure above the marine layer which increases its depth, making it more difficult for surface heating to evaporate the clouds within it. These periods of persistent overcast have inspired colloquialisms such as "May Gray", "June Gloom", "No Sky July" and "Fogust".

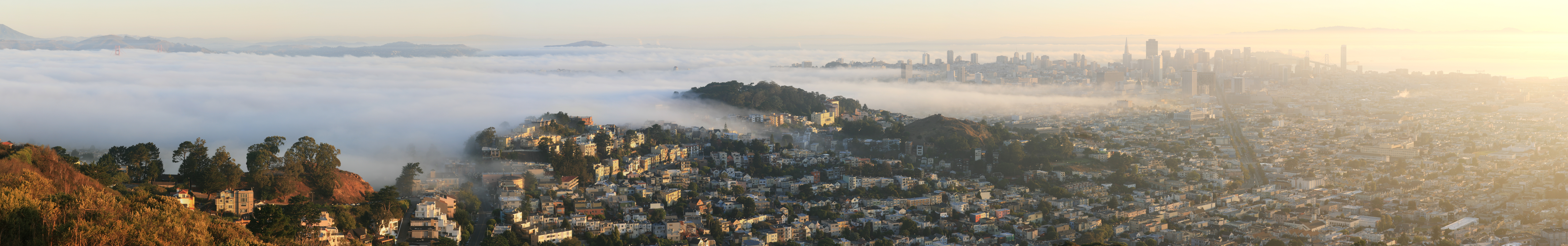
San Francisco panorama looking northeast from Twin Peaks

== Climate change ==
Research published in 2010 showed that summertime fog in California decreased by 33% from 1950 to 2010. The decline in fog has been attributed to climate change, and is concerning for the local ecology, for example the redwood trees. Climate change contributes to the warming of the oceans, directly resulting in less fog as ocean water is not cold enough to mix with hot, moist air currents to create fog. Lower fog levels are also problematic for the agricultural regions fog patterns support, such as the Napa and Salinas Valleys. Not only has the fog season shortened, lasting from June to September instead of from May to October, but the hours per day there is fog has shortened by about three hours. The attribution of the reduction in fog and of global warming itself to the Pacific decadal oscillation is generally rejected.

Fog, however, may be a potential solution to other effects of climate change such as water scarcity. Already seen globally in places such as Kenya and parts of Southeast Asia, fog can be collected and turned into potable drinking water. Mesh nets have been developed to capture and store fog effectively. A Canadian nonprofit FogQuest has started testing fog harvesting in the Bay Area and along the California coast.

== Art and culture ==
Writers, poets, and photographers have long been inspired by the fog, including Herb Caen, Jack Kerouac, August Kleinzahler, and Arthur Ollman. Sam Green made a film about San Francisco's fog for the Exploratorium, which premiered in 2013. Many Alfred Hitchcock movies including Shadow of a Doubt, Vertigo, and The Birds were set in San Francisco, invoking the fog and its eeriness as a backdrop. In Kyle Boelte's 2015 book The Beautiful Unseen: Variations on Fog and Forgetting, San Francisco's fog becomes a metaphor for grief and the limitations of memory, something developed in the Exploratorium as well.

== In popular culture ==
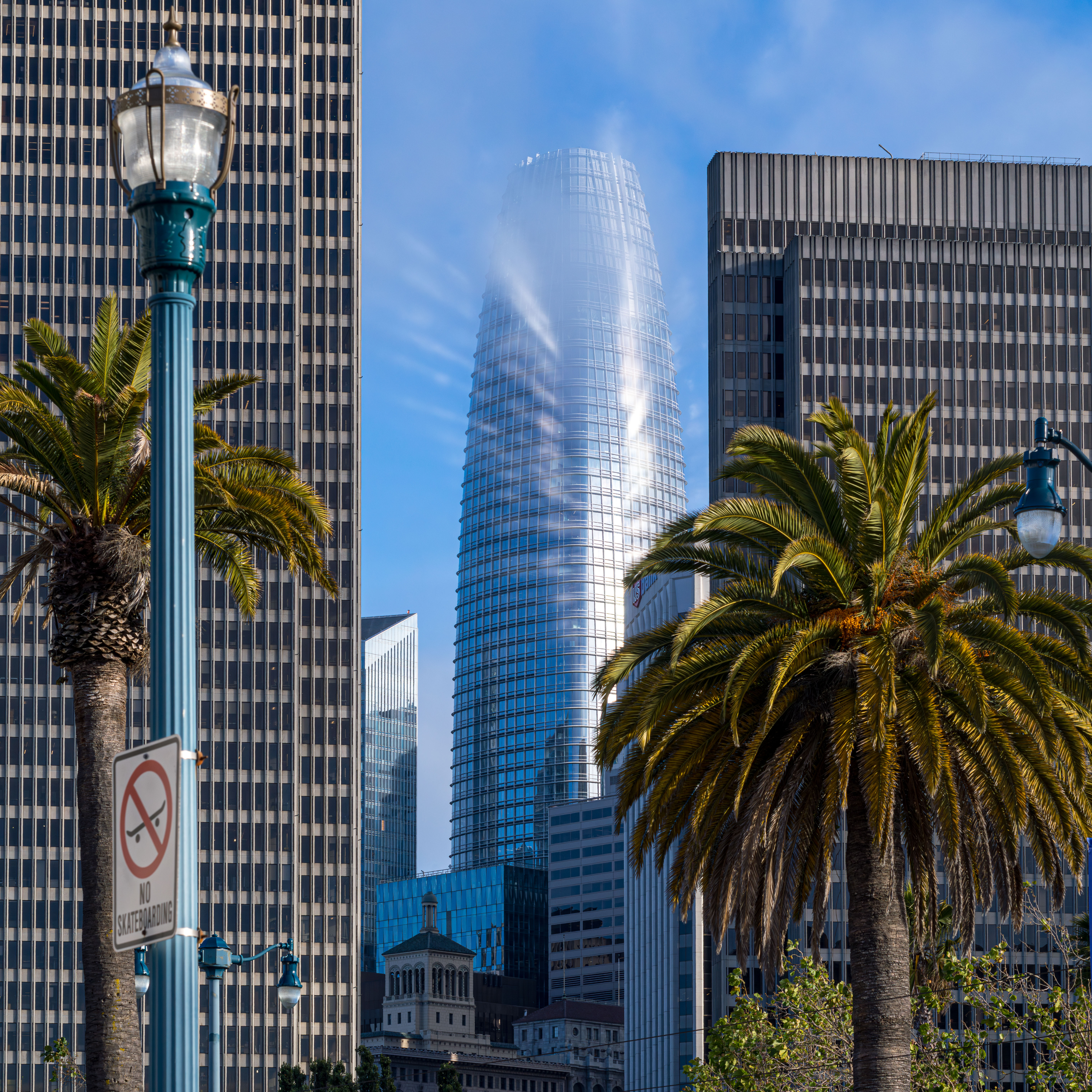
Fog interaction with the Salesforce Tower

In 2010 an anonymous person began a Twitter account for the San Francisco fog, inspired by the fake BP public relations account that appeared after the oil spill in the Gulf of Mexico that year. It was named "Karl the Fog" after the misunderstood giant in the 2003 film Big Fish, and the name has become widely used since. There is a companion Instagram account. The name is also used throughout episode 8 of Carmen Sandiego. The name was disparaged by 3 local celebrities during the 2020 PGA golf tournament.

The term is particularly "loathed" by longtime city residents, who feel it is a "Yuppie" invention often used by transplants and serves as a marker of the gentrification that has reshaped parts of the city, displacing ethnic communities of color in favor of white techies.

== Accidents ==
In 1901, 128 people died aboard SS City of Rio de Janeiro after the boat hit the reef due to low visibility from the fog. In 2007, in fog, a container ship named Cosco Busan struck the Bay Bridge connecting San Francisco and Oakland. This caused a large oil spill that closed public beaches, killed wildlife, and halted commercial fishing in the area. In 2013, Overseas Reymar, a 748-foot-long tanker, was proceeding to sea from an anchorage off San Francisco after discharging its cargo of crude oil at a Martinez refinery when it hit the base of the Echo tower of the Bay Bridge in fog.
