= Tule fog =

Annual fog event in California's Central Valley

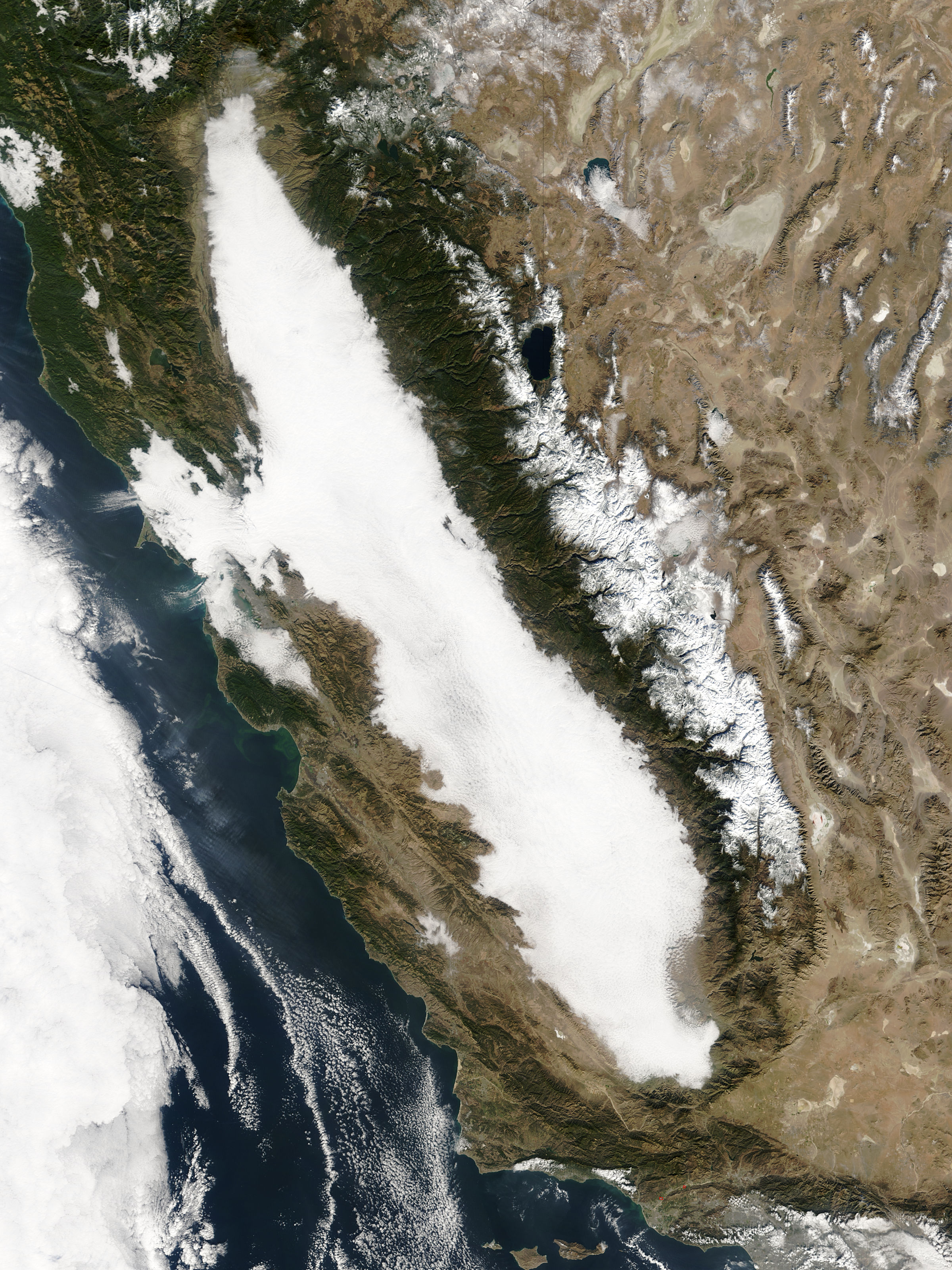
Tule fog captured by NASA's Terra Satellite in January 2005. The Sacramento Valley and San Joaquin Valley (together called the Central Valley) are almost completely covered in tule fog

Tule fog (/ˈtuːli/ TOO-lee) is a thick ground fog that settles in the San Joaquin Valley and Sacramento Valley areas of California's Central Valley. Tule fog forms from late fall through early spring (California's winter season) after the first significant rainfall. The official time frame for tule fog to form is from November 1 to March 31. This phenomenon is named after the tule grass wetlands (tulares) of the Central Valley. As of 2005, tule fog was the leading cause of weather-related accidents in California.

== Formation ==
Tule fog is a radiation fog, which condenses when there is a high relative humidity (typically after a heavy rain), calm winds, and rapid cooling during the night. The nights are longer in the winter months, which allows an extended period of ground cooling, and thereby a pronounced temperature inversion at a low altitude.

In California, tule fog can extend from Bakersfield to Red Bluff, covering a distance of over 400 miles (640 km). Tule fog occasionally drifts as far west as the San Francisco Bay Area via the Carquinez Strait, and can even drift westward out through the Golden Gate, opposite to the usual course of the coastal fog.

Tule fog is characteristically confined mainly to the Central Valley due to the mountain ranges surrounding it. Because of the density of the cold air in the winter, winds are not able to dislodge the fog and the high pressure of the warmer air above the mountaintops presses down on the cold air trapped in the valley, resulting in a dense, immobile fog that can last for days or at times for weeks undisturbed. Tule fog often contains light drizzle or freezing drizzle where temperatures are sufficiently cold.

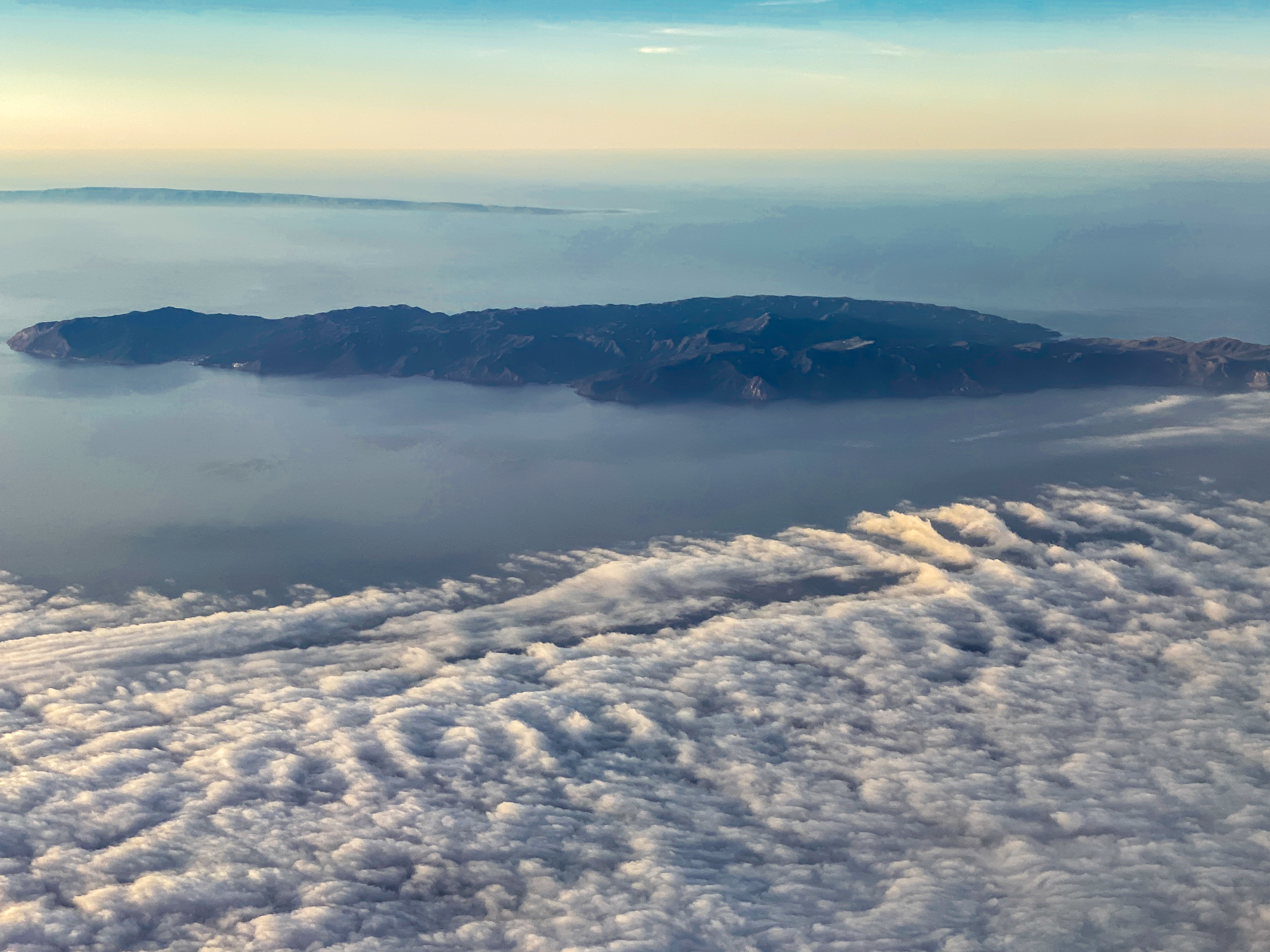
Aerial view showing tule fog spreading across Southern California in December 2025

Tule fog is a low cloud, usually below 2,000 feet (600 m) in altitude and can be seen from above by driving up into the foothills of the Sierra Nevada to the east or the Coast Ranges to the west. Above the cold, foggy layer, the air is typically mild, dry and clear. Once tule fog has formed, turbulent air is necessary to break through the temperature inversion layer. Daytime heating (cloud-penetrating visible light wavelengths transformed to infrared by the ground) sometimes evaporates the fog in patches, although the air remains chilly and hazy below the inversion and fog reforms soon after sunset. Tule fog usually remains longer in the southern and eastern parts of the Central Valley, because winter storms with strong winds and turbulent air affect the northern Central Valley more often.

== Visibility ==
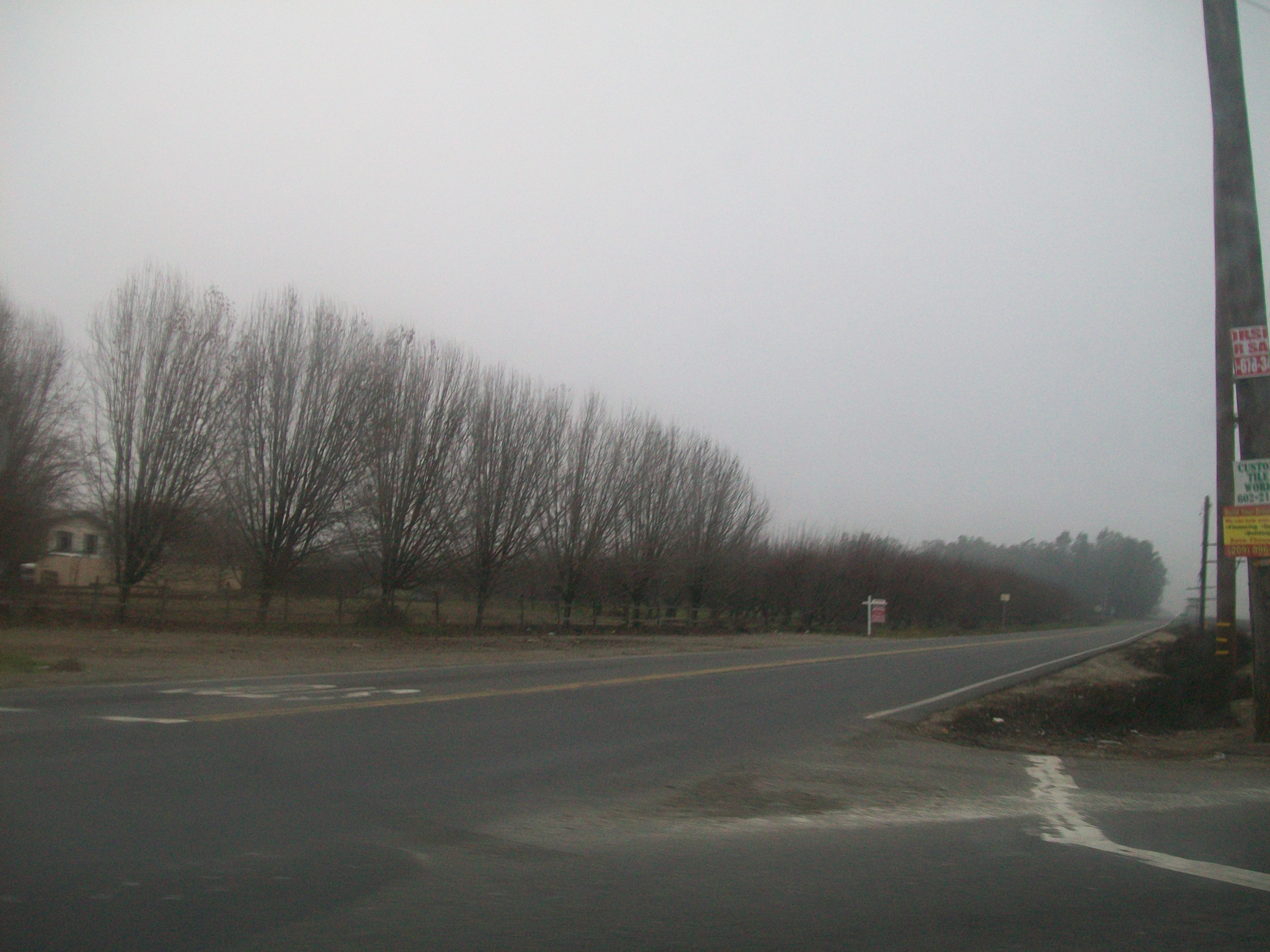
Tule fog settled on an orchard in Stanislaus County in November 2008

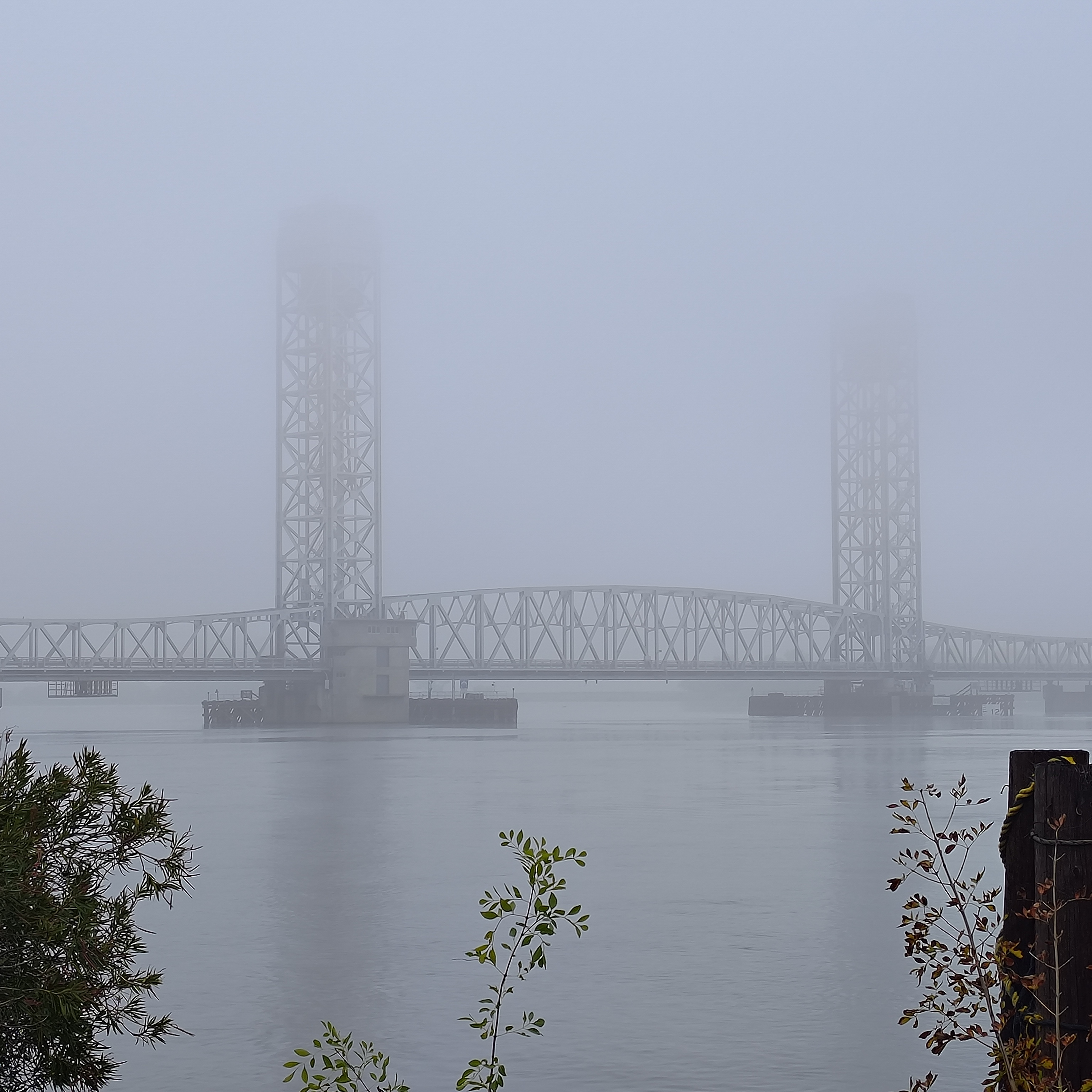
Tule fog limiting visibility along the Sacramento river

Visibility in tule fog is usually less than 600 feet (180 m). Visibility can vary drastically; in only a few feet, visibility can go from 10 feet (3.0 m) to near zero.

The variability in visibility is the cause of many chain-reaction pile-ups on roads and freeways. In one such accident on Interstate 5 near Elk Grove south of Sacramento, 25 cars and nine big-rig trucks collided inside a fog bank on December 12, 1997. Five people died and 28 were injured. It took 26 hours to clear away all the wreckage and reopen the freeway. In February 2002, two people were killed in an 80-plus-car pile-up on State Route 99 between Kingsburg and Selma. On the morning of November 3, 2007, heavy tule fog caused a massive pile-up that included 108 passenger vehicles and 18 big-rig trucks on northbound State Route 99 between Fowler and Fresno. Visibility was about 200 feet (60 m) at the time of the accident. There were two fatalities and 39 injuries in the crash. On January 6, 2024, foggy conditions led to a pile-up of over 40 vehicles in Kern County on the southbound side of I-5 that left two dead and nine injured. By the time emergency services had arrived, the tule fog left about 10 feet (3 m) of visibility. Following the 2007 pile-up, the California Department of Transportation spent $12 million to install a fog-detecting and warning system. The technology detects fog and uses microwave sensors to track when vehicles begin to slow down. This system was developed for a 13-mile section of Highway 99, south of Fresno, due to its high number of accidents. A driver education program and phone line were also included in this project to offer motorists information. Studies on the success of this system are unknown, due to declining tule fog.

== Freezing drizzle and black ice ==
Tule fog events are often accompanied by drizzle. Sunlight often cannot sufficiently penetrate the fog layer, keeping temperatures below freezing. Episodes of freezing drizzle occasionally accompany tule fog events during winter. Such events can leave an invisible glaze of black ice on roadways, making travel especially treacherous.

== Composition ==
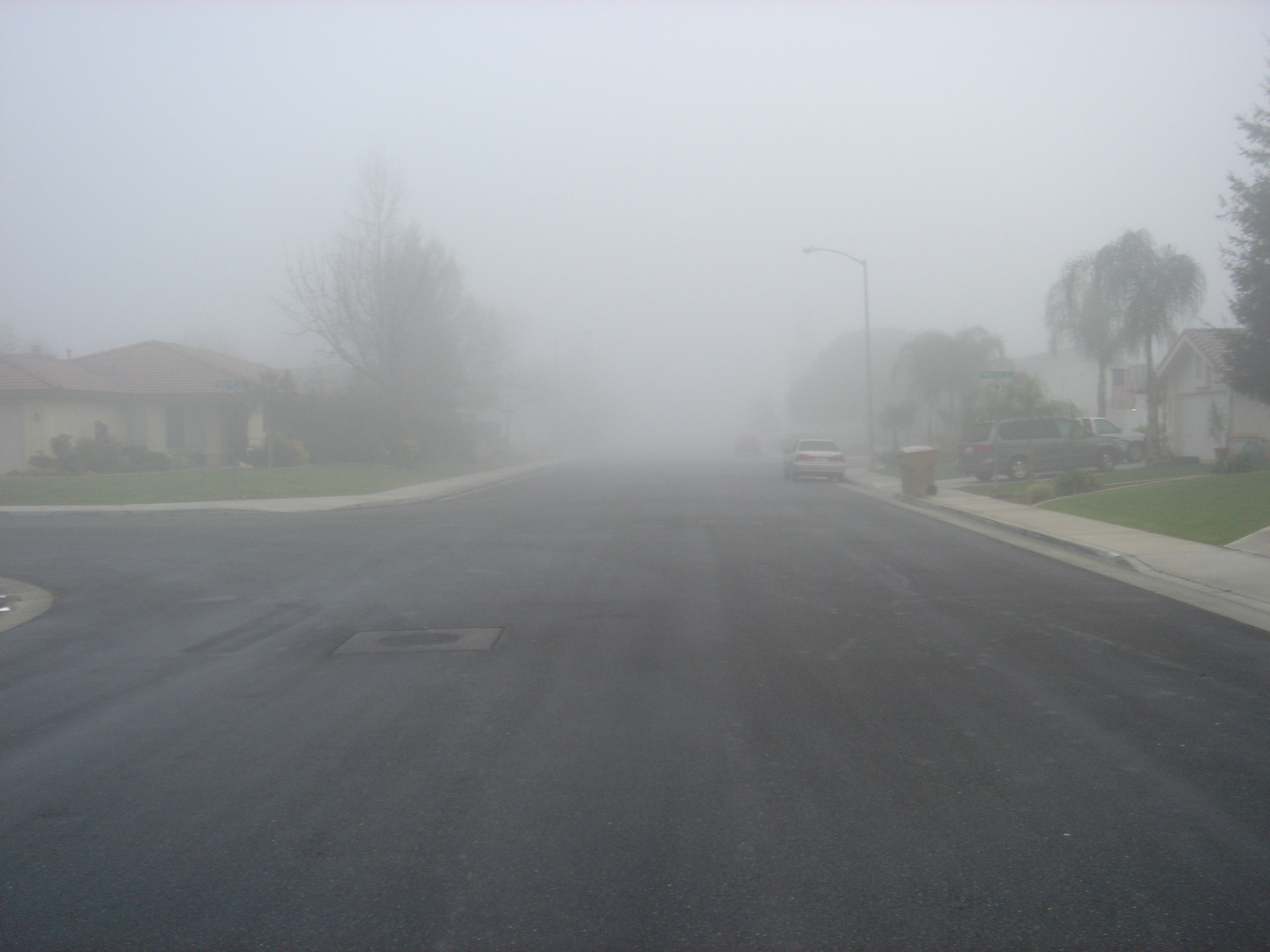
Tule fog in Bakersfield in January 2006

Besides water droplets, the composition of tule fog in the San Joaquin and Sacramento valleys includes ammonia, nitrate and sulfate concentrations. Furthermore, ammonia is the most commonly found single ion and usually is measured to be more than half of the measured ions in the fog. Depending on the region within the California Central Valley, the composition of tule fog can vary in element or ion concentrations.

As of 2014, it has been discovered that the quantity of tule fog has decreased in the Central Valley from when it was initially studied from 1981 to 1999 compared to 2001–2012. The frequency of tule fog occurrence is proportional to the higher air pollution in California. Minimum temperature, DPD (the difference between ambient temperature and dew point), precipitation, and wind speed are the four major components that affect fog formation. Minimum temperature affects tule fog formation because it is an extreme form of radiation fog that most often forms after sunset due to rapid surface radiative cooling. Low DPD is consistent with more frequent periods of fog. Precipitation has somewhat of a correlation to an increase in fog; however, it is not directly correlated due to some precipitation totals being inversely correlated to some fog years. Wind speed has a small but statistically important impact on fog frequency: lower wind speeds are correlated with higher fog frequency.

Winter causes the optimal meteorological conditions for fog formation due to periodic storms followed by extended periods of high pressure throughout California.

== Declining fog ==
Researchers observing the Central Valley fog climate over the course of 33 years found that tule fog has been on a decline. In the study, a 46% drop in the number of fog days since 1981 was observed. Other research has also seen an overall decline in the amount of hours the Central Valley experiences a winter chill (temperatures 32 °F (0 °C)-45 °F (7 °C)) since the 1950s. With a decrease in the Central Valley's winter chill, fog also decreases.

This decrease is likely to continue if factors like global warming, climate change, urban heat islands, California drought, and air-pollution control continue. 2019 research found that fog patterns follow that of pollution levels, increasing and decreasing with air pollution. Tule fog was documented to have increased by 85% between 1930 and 1970, and then decreased by 76% between 1980 and 2016. These trends follow that of air pollution, initially rising between 1930 and 1970 due to increased farming and industrialization, then falling in the 1970s after the implementation of air pollution regulations. This correlation is due to nitrogen oxides reacting with ammonia, producing ammonium nitrate particles. These particles promote the condensation of water vapor into fog. Observed since 1980, as nitrogen oxide emissions fall, tule fog levels do as well.

A decrease in tule fog may lead to a variety of negative impacts on California’s massive agricultural industry. Agriculture in the Central Valley provides 95% of fruit and nut production to the U.S. and boasts a multi-billion dollar economy. Major crops grown in Central California such as almonds, cherries, pistachios, and peaches require prolonged temperatures between 32 °F (0 °C) and 45 °F (7 °C) during winter to grow, and tule fog is a major contributor to this winter chill. Without this weather, many Central Valley crops cannot be grown due to the crops needing this dormant time in winter to later produce fruit. Tule fog also helps shield crops from the sun during the winter chill.
