= Kinneloa Mesa, California =

Unincorporated community in California, United States

- Unincorporated community
- Location within Los Angeles county

- Location within the state of California Kinneloa Mesa, California (the United States)
- Coordinates: 34°10′33″N 118°5′0″W
- Country: United States
- State: California
- County: Los Angeles

Area
  - Total: 1.96 sq mi (5.1 km^{2})

Population (2000)
  - Total: 1,070
  - Density: 546/sq mi (211/km^{2})
- Time zone: UTC-8 (Pacific (PST))
  - Summer (DST): UTC-7 (PDT)
- ZIP codes: 91001, 91107

Kinneloa Mesa is an unincorporated community located in Los Angeles County, California, United States, with a population of 1,070 as of 2000. Unlike Altadena, a larger unincorporated area nearby, Kinneloa Mesa is not an official census-designated place. The area was sometimes referred to as "unincorporated Pasadena", which it technically is not as that is not an official term and the area is not a part of Pasadena. Kinneloa Mesa is on the Los Angeles County list of unincorporated areas and street maps, including those of the Los Angeles County Assessor's office which recognize Kinneloa Mesa Road and Kinneloa Canyon Road as the area's two principal roads.

Kinneloa Mesa is an unincorporated community of the Fifth Supervisorial District of Los Angeles County. It is bordered by the San Gabriel Mountains and the Angeles National Forest to the north and the city of Pasadena around the rest of its perimeter. It is also near Altadena, across the Eaton Canyon wash, and Sierra Madre, across an intervening fingertip section of Pasadena.

== History ==
The streets on Kinneloa Mesa were created and named by the founder of the Kinneloa Mesa community Mr. Abbot Kinney. The name "Kinneloa" meaning "Big Kinney" in ‘Ōlelo Hawai’i (Hawaiian language), although they thought it meant “Kinney’s Hill” inspired from “Maunaloa.” This logic was later used to create the street names in a Hawaiian fashion, (Mesaloa, Meyerloa, Lindaloa). The street name Clarmeya was named for the two original residents of Kinneloa Mesa, the Clarks and the Meyers. The community is situated beside a hill that when looking down, it resembles a Hawaiian mountain range. This resemblance inspired the Hawaiian names for the streets and community itself.

According to Altadena web-historians, Kinneloa Mesa may comprise part or all of the ranch of Abbot Kinney, and the community has also been known as the Kinneloa Estates.

In 1993, the Kinneloa Fire, begun accidentally on the slopes above Eaton Canyon, burned dozens of homes in Kinneloa Mesa and neighboring Altadena as part of a rash of late October wildfires driven by Santa Ana winds in Southern California. One man died of complications from smoke inhalation and dozens were injured.

In 2025, Kinneloa Mesa was affected by the Eaton Fire, with an evacuation order issued and some structures burned.

Sources that reference Kinneloa Mesa occasionally misspell Kinneloa as "Kinneola".

== Sources ==
- "Burning Concerns; New Mexico 'Controlled' Fire Puts Local Officials on Defensive", by Lee Condon. Los Angeles Times. Los Angeles, Calif.: May 21, 2000, page 1.
- "Cold Front Puts the Chill on Ill Winds; Weather: Alaskan storm system blocks return of powerful Santa Ana winds." by Dexter Filkins, Eric Malnic. Los Angeles Times. Los Angeles, Calif.: Oct 27, 1996, page 1.
- "Californians Set For More Wind And New Blazes; But a Day of Calm Lets Firefighters Catch Up", by Robert Reinhold. New York Times, New York, N.Y.: Oct 30, 1993, page 6.
- "Transient's Act Means Others Now Homeless", by Deborah Hastings. The Associated Press. Orange County Register. Santa Ana, Calif.: Oct 29, 1993, page A24.
- "A Drive in January", by Clara Spalding Brown. Ballou's Monthly Magazine. Boston, Mass.: July to December, 1883, page 62.
- "The Plateau of Sierra Madre", by Charles F. Lummis. The Land of Sunshine: A Southwestern Magazine. Los Angeles, Calif.: December, 1895, to, May, 1896, page 193.
