= Laguna Fire (1993) =

1993 wildfire in Southern California

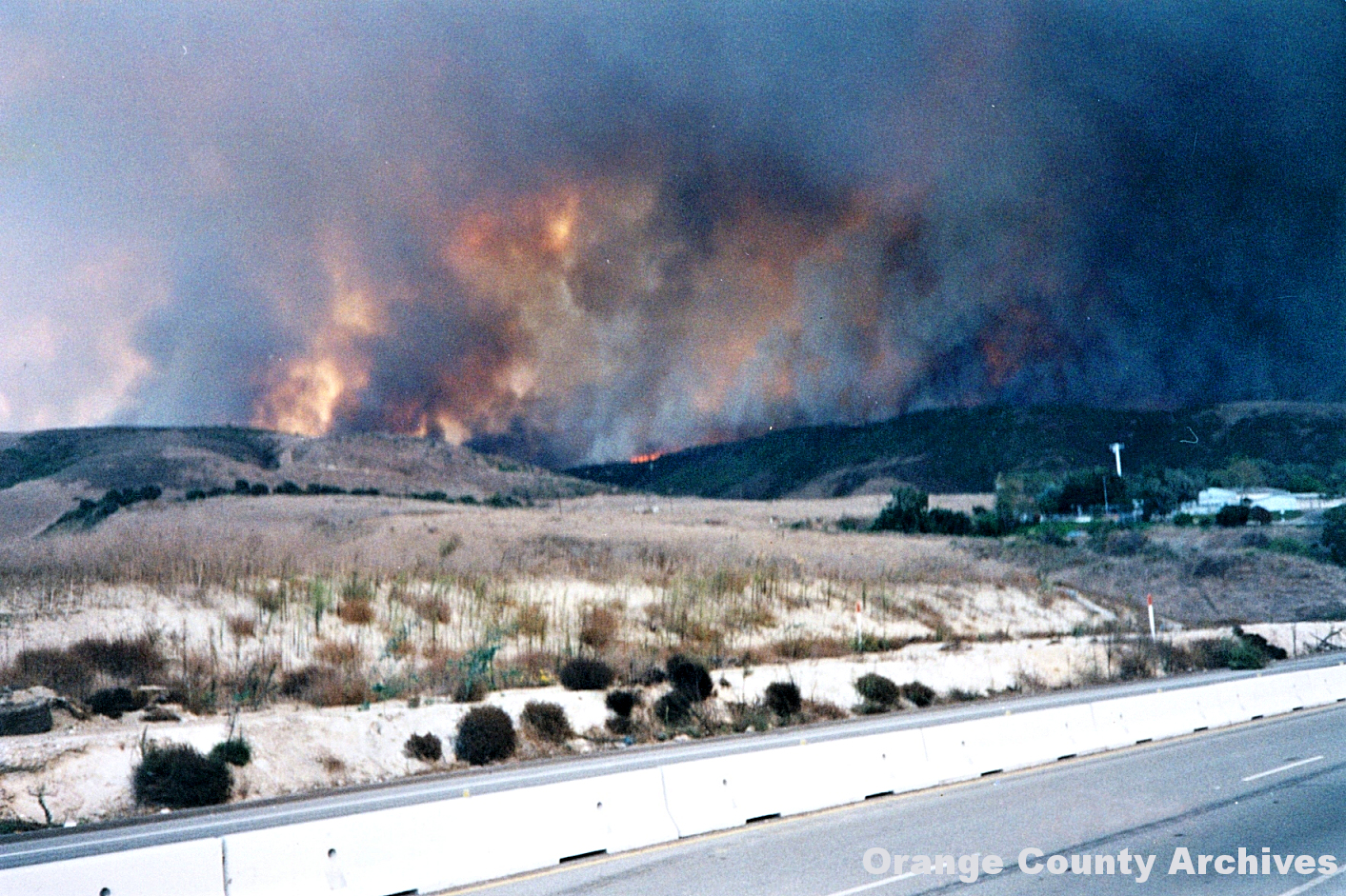
- The Laguna Fire seen from the Pacific Coast Highway on October 27, 1993
- Date: October 27 –; October 31, 1993; (5 days)
- Location: Orange County, California, United States
- Coordinates: 33.533°N 117.766°W

Statistics
- Burned area: 16,864 acres (6,825 ha; 26 sq mi; 68 km^{2})

Impacts
- Deaths: 0
- Injuries: 8
- Evacuated: ≥24,500
- Structures lost: 441
- Cost: $528 million; (equivalent to about $1,032 million in 2024)

Ignition
- Cause: Arson

Map
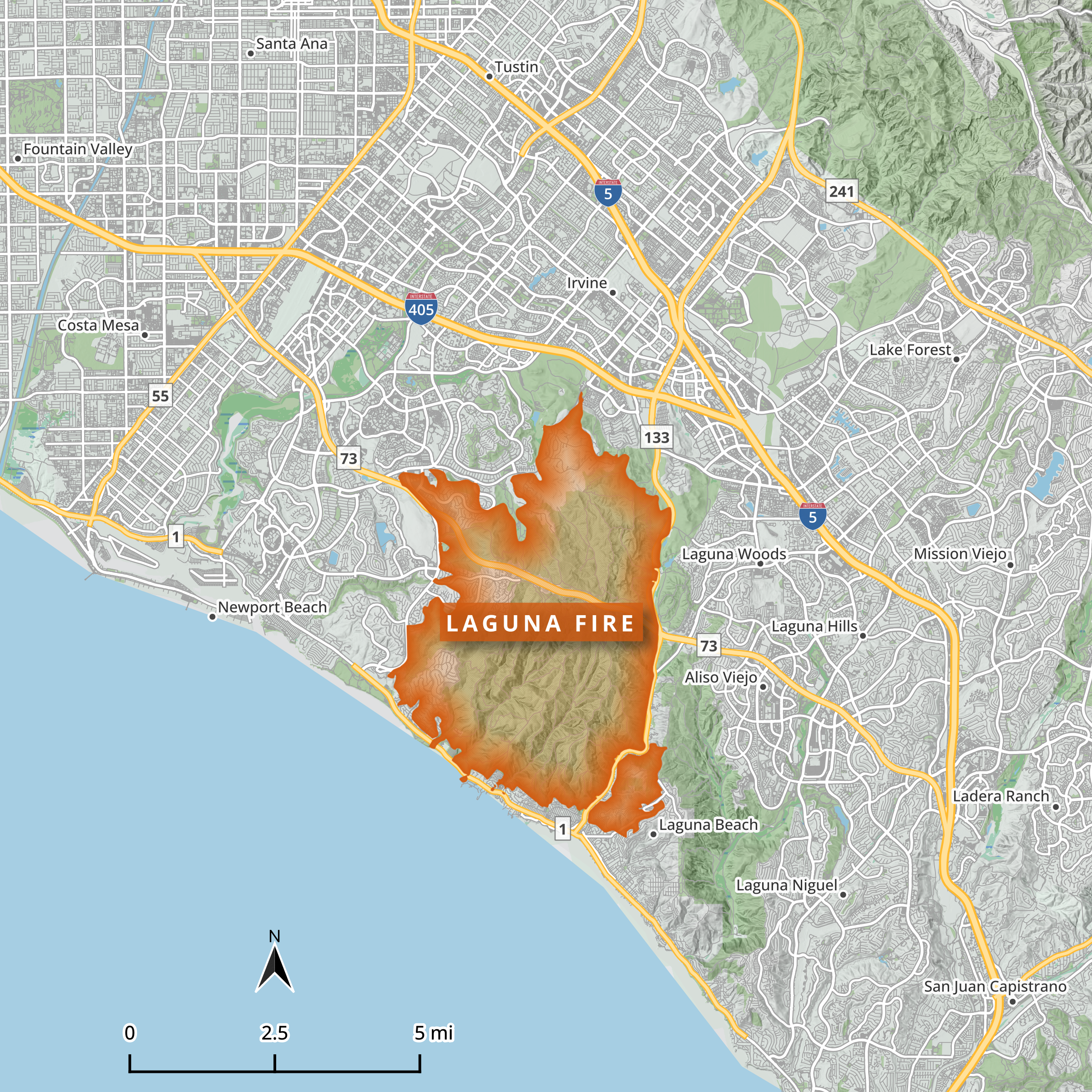
- The footprint of the Laguna Fire

- The general location of the Laguna Fire in coastal Southern California

The 1993 Laguna Fire or Laguna Canyon Fire was a destructive wildfire in Orange County, California. After igniting on October 27, the fire burned more than 16,000 acres (6,500 hectares) and destroyed hundreds of homes in Laguna Beach and Emerald Bay before it was fully contained on October 31. The fire forced almost 25,000 people to evacuate and caused approximately $528 million in damage, becoming one of the most costly fires in United States history. It was part of a larger outbreak of wildfires that week in Southern California, largely driven by Santa Ana winds.

== Background ==
The vegetated wildland areas of Orange County are naturally prone to wildfires. The steep terrain and naturally flammable vegetation are conducive to fire spread, which can be augmented by Santa Ana winds: seasonal hot and dry katabatic winds. This was the case for the Laguna Fire, during which sustained wind speeds of 40 miles per hour (64 km/h) and gusts of up to 92 miles per hour (148 km/h) were recorded.

Prior to the Laguna Fire and the other concurrent wildfires in Southern California, there had been six years of drought conditions. These were followed by a wet winter in 1992–1993, which let grass and brush grow before it dried again in the hot summer of 1993. This left much dead and dry vegetation to burn. A proposed controlled burn to reduce the built-up fuels several years earlier had never been carried out. In addition to these factors, development in the wildland–urban interface aided fire spread. Many homes were built in vulnerable locations and constructed with flammable materials (e.g. wood shingle roofs and siding).

== Progression ==
=== October 27 ===
The Laguna Fire was first reported near Laguna Canyon Road via 911 calls at 11:50 a.m. on October 27. When firefighters reached the scene several minutes later, the incipient wildfire was burning two acres (0.81 hectares) of vegetation on unincorporated county land, but it quickly moved into thicker brush and intensified, with flames up to 25 feet (7.6 m) tall. As winds increased and firefighters recognized the fire was getting away from them, they tried to muster more resources: at 12:08 p.m. the operations section chief asked for eight air tankers, and a minute later the fire department requested 90 fire engines to deploy along the wildland–urban interface in Laguna Beach itself. The California Department of Forestry and Fire Protection (Cal Fire) notified Orange County that all available aircraft had already been summoned to major wildfires burning elsewhere.

By 12:28 p.m., the fire had split into three separate fronts, threatening El Morro, Emerald Bay, and Laguna on their march to the Pacific Ocean. The fire's behavior had also intensified: flame lengths were routinely 40 to 50 feet (12 to 15 m) and occasionally reached 200 feet (61 m) into the air. As the fire reached Emerald Canyon, burning the upper drainage at a rate of 100 acres (40 ha) per minute, firefighters recognized the impossibility of defending the homes within the canyon with their limited resources and withdrew. Air tankers, delayed by the other ongoing wildfires, arrived at 1:40 p.m. Their utility was hampered by low visibility, so they could only drop water and fire retardant on the flanks of the fire instead of the surging head. Homes began to burn in Emerald Bay by 2:00 p.m.

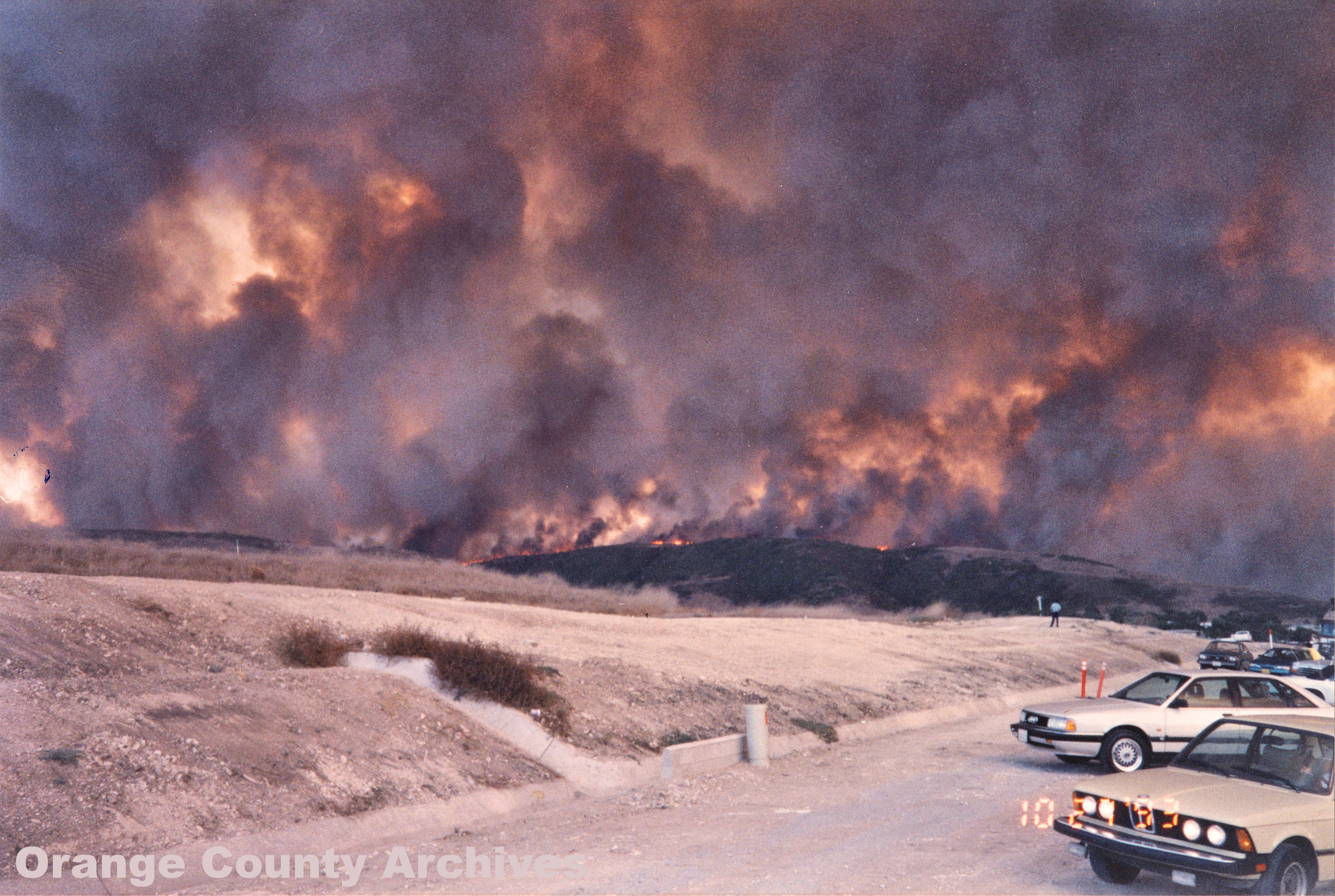
The Laguna Fire burning on October 27

Shortly before 2:45 p.m., recognizing the expanding scope of the fire's threat, the incident commander "decentralized and delegated authority" to lower rungs of leadership, allowing firefighters to pick and choose which targets they thought they could save. The overall objectives became saving lives among the hilly residential neighborhoods, and protecting downtown Laguna Beach itself. The fire reached the El Morro mobile home park and destroyed 44 trailers there. Firefighters were stretched so thin that California Highway Patrol and local police officers had to operate hoses.

In the afternoon, firefighters began a firing operation on the west side of Laguna Canyon Highway, seeking to deprive the fire of fuel and prevent it from crossing the road to the east. They were unsuccessful, and the fire jumped across the road, establishing itself there while demonstrating behavior so extreme that fire officials observing via helicopter recommended that Laguna Beach itself be evacuated. As law enforcement undertook that process, the fire reached the neighborhood of Canyon Acres, having traveled 1.25 miles (2.01 km) in only 17 minutes (a speed of more than 4.4 miles per hour (7.1 km/h)). Firefighters established new primary lines of defense within the city itself. The fire reached the incident command post that had been established at Thurston Middle School, destroying a dozen classrooms as firefighters quickly lit more firing operations to protect the Top of the World neighborhood.Around 4:30 p.m., the fire was burning four structures every minute. With more than 200 homes ablaze, it also threatened institutional buildings like Laguna Beach High School and Laguna Beach City Hall. A group of city employees used water hoses to defend the city hall and the auxiliary generator (which was powering the city's emergency communications system at the time) from embers cast down on the wind. As the wind shifted, the fire front moved away from the building and the threat to downtown Laguna Beach lessened.

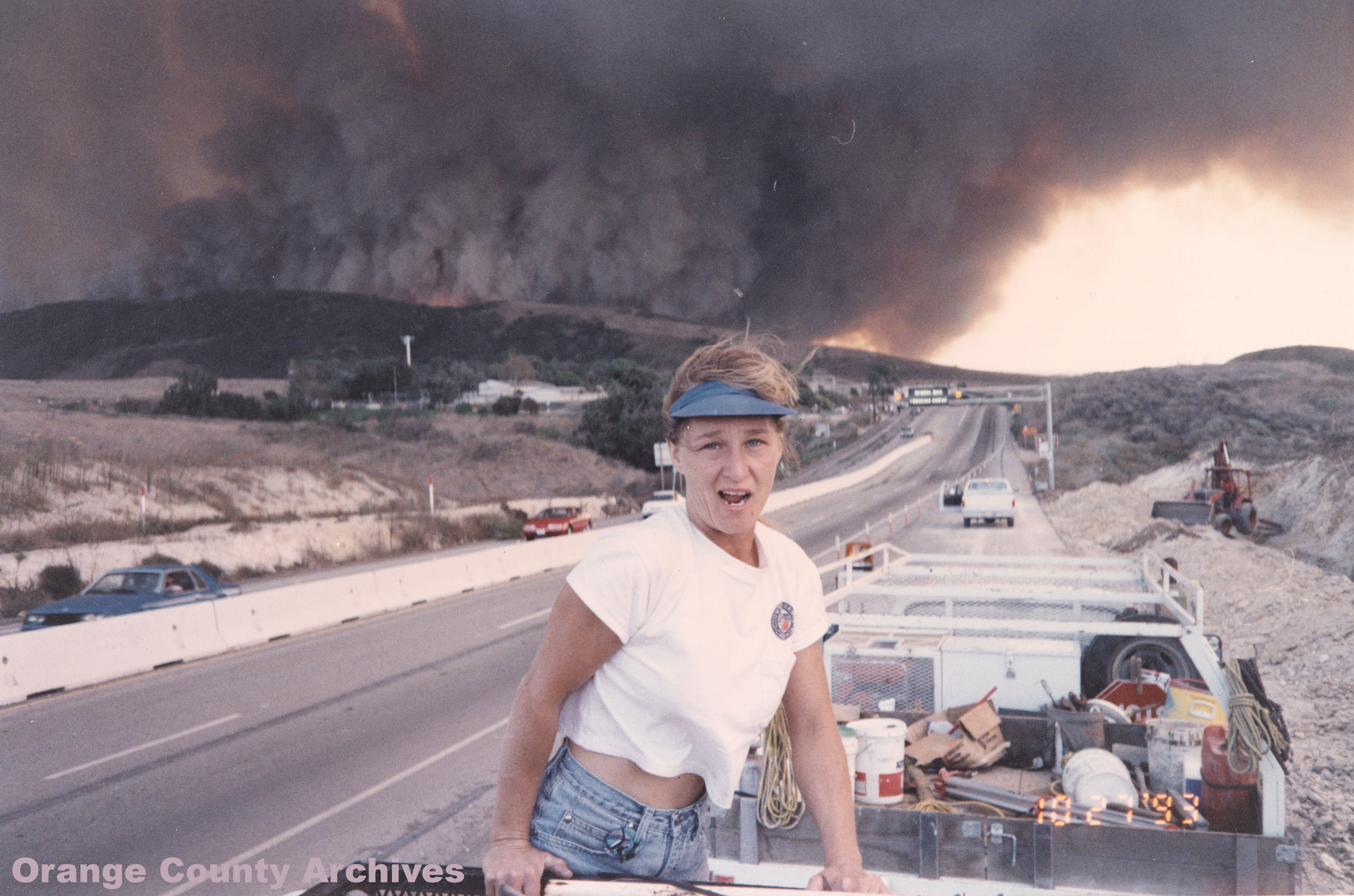
The Laguna Fire from the Pacific Coast Highway on October 27

Late in the day, the state's Office of Emergency Services announced that the Laguna Fire had become the top priority in the state. Meanwhile, the evening finally saw progress against the fire. At 5:30 p.m. firefighters began firing operations along Newport Coast Drive between Bonita Canyon and the Pacific Coast Highway to stop the fire's advance towards Newport Beach. An hour later, the fire had burned a total of 11,500 acres (4,700 ha). Near 10:00 p.m., the winds shifted: the downslope Santa Ana winds lessened and were replaced by onshore flow. This caused the fire to move towards Irvine. (Note: Onshore winds blow from a body of water towards/over land, while offshore winds blow in the opposite direction: from the land towards the water.) By 10:30 p.m. the fire was declared 30 percent contained; firing operations along Newport Coast Drive concluded by 11:10 p.m. Fire officials declared a 'turning point' near midnight, aided by calmer winds and a moist marine layer moving inland.

=== October 28–31 ===
By morning, the fire was 60 percent contained. Throughout the day, bulldozers constructed firebreaks on the fire's north side between the community of Turtle Rock and Laguna Canyon Road, and firefighters continued with firing operations. Meanwhile, the fire itself burned in Bommer and Shady canyons. By 6:00 p.m., the Orange County Fire Authority's report suggested that the whole fire was "roughly contained".

On October 29, California governor Pete Wilson visited Laguna to walk the disaster area as marine troops from nearby Camp Pendleton hunted through destroyed structures for bodies, finding none. The Laguna Fire was declared 100 percent contained at 6:00 p.m. that evening, and was declared 100 percent controlled at 6:00 p.m. on October 31. (Note: 'Containment' and 'control' of a wildfire are technical terms used by the California Department of Forestry and Fire Protection (Cal Fire). A wildfire is contained when it is completely encircled by control lines (including fire breaks, burned-out areas, and natural features). A wildfire is controlled when it is contained and has been extinguished such that it no longer threatens to spread any further.) The total area burned came to 16,864 acres (6,825 ha).

Seasonal rains in early November caused mudslides in Laguna Beach. Just 0.25–0.5 inches (0.64–1.27 cm) of rain fell during the first storm, but the fire-denuded slopes gave way and the resulting mudslides damaged more than two dozen homes and multiple vehicles.

== Cause ==
The Orange County Fire Department chief named arson as the cause, but no perpetrator or motive was ever identified. Fire investigators examined the fire's point of origin, which they determined was 80 feet (24 m) from Laguna Canyon Road. They found no physical evidence of an ignition source—such as a power line or a cigarette butt—and based on these facts ruled out any chance of the fire starting accidentally. Construction had forced traffic to slow at the time of the fire's ignition, and investigators speculated that the arsonist was in a vehicle. They contacted motorists who had been in the area as they also filtered through hundreds of tips by phone in the weeks following the fire. A $50,000 reward was posted. Orange County fire officials wound down the active investigation by mid-1994, still not having identified the person responsible.

In September 1994, a Jose Soto Martinez was arrested for starting several small fires in Fullerton. After his arrest, Martinez confessed to having also set the Laguna Fire, providing investigators with "surprisingly accurate" details. Orange County's district attorney held a press conference following the confession, announcing the arrest and charges against Martinez and declaring that they had found the man responsible for the Laguna Fire. However, it quickly came to light that Martinez suffered from delusions and had been interned in a Mexican prison at the time of the fire. Prosecutors swiftly dropped the charges against him for the Laguna Fire.

== Effects ==
The Laguna Fire caused no deaths and eight injuries. The number of people affected by evacuation orders and warnings included the entire population of Laguna Beach, or roughly 24,500 people.

The fire destroyed 441 structures. Orange County's sheriff, Brad Gates, deemed the fire the worst in Orange County history. California Department of Forestry and Fire Protection records indicate that at the time the fire was the sixth most destructive wildfire in California history, since surpassed by many others. The fire resulted in $528 million in property damage. A 2012 list by the National Fire Protection Association of the 25 largest fire losses in United States history (adjusted for inflation) put the 1993 Laguna Fire at fifteenth place. Laguna Beach lost 286 homes. By the summer of 1996, 46 percent of those destroyed homes had been rebuilt, and 83 percent of those who had lost their houses had applied to rebuild them. In Emerald Bay, which saw 63 homes destroyed, 50 were rebuilt or were under construction. By 1997, 231 of the destroyed Laguna Beach homes had been rebuilt or were under construction.

The Orange County Board of Supervisors had declared a local emergency at 4:00 p.m. on October 27; the local state of emergency was renewed several times at two-week intervals as the deleterious effects of the Laguna Fire (and others in the county) persisted. California governor Pete Wilson declared a state of emergency in Orange County (among others) the following day, and at Wilson's request President Bill Clinton also issued a Declaration of Major Disaster for California. This allowed the Federal Emergency Management Agency to offer aid in the affected counties, including Orange.

=== County and municipal improvements ===
According to the Laguna Beach County Water District, approximately sixteen million U.S. gallons (sixty-one million liters) of water was required to help combat the fire, with a peak demand of roughly 20,000 U.S. gallons (76,000 L) per minute. Six of 22 reservoirs in the district were completely drained by firefighting operations. Following the fire, the district built an additional two reservoirs and purchased backup generators and pumps. A Los Angeles Times investigation after the fire found that water capacity had generally not been a limiting factor during the fire; instead, it had been the distribution system. In the Skyline and Mystic Hills neighborhoods, pumps were able to deliver 4,400 U.S. gallons (17,000 L) per minute to reservoirs there, but firefighters there could use 90,000 U.S. gallons (340,000 L) per minute. In other areas, as homes burned, the pipes inside them broke and added to water pressure issues.

The city of Laguna Beach and Orange County authorities made efforts to improve their fire prevention and response abilities after the 1993 fire. In addition to building two new reservoirs, the city strengthened building codes by requiring that new homes not have wood shingle roofs, that they have covered eaves, and include automatic sprinkler systems. The fire department received new specialized fire equipment, including engines and hoses. Laguna Beach also expanded an existing vegetation management program, using 600 goats year-round. The Orange County Fire Authority began operating two water-dropping helicopters, hired a forecaster for fire weather, and constructed two remote weather stations.

== See also ==
- Kinneloa Fire
- Laguna Fire
