= Geography of southern California =

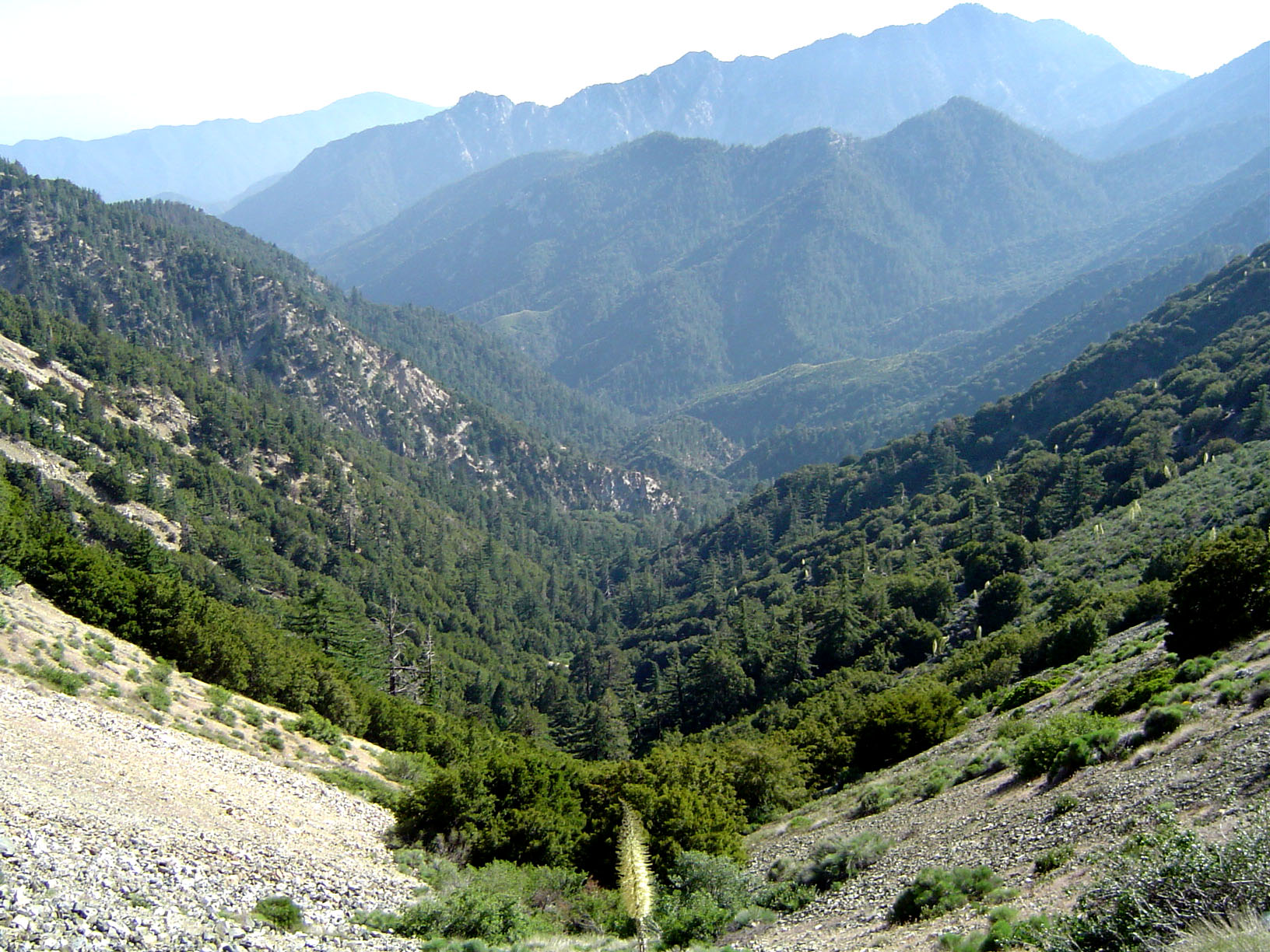
The San Gabriel Mountains, part of the Angeles National Forest in Los Angeles County, California

The geography of southern California refers to the geography of Southern California in the United States.

== Climate ==
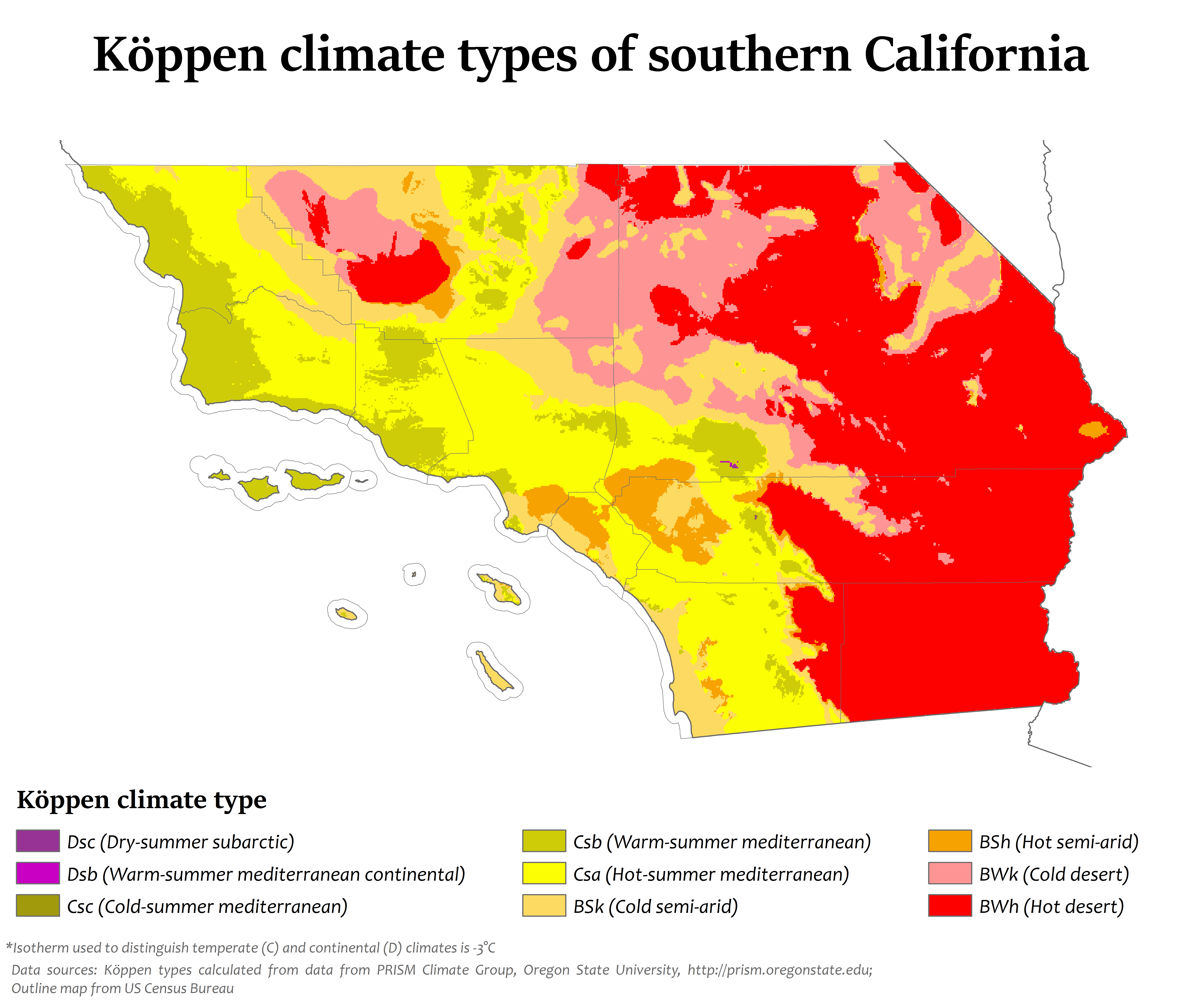
Köppen climate types of southern California

Despite the popular image of California as a place of sunshine and perfect weather, the local climate can be very diverse, with some areas experiencing more extreme conditions. However, the weather in the region is usually mild, especially in the winter, and dry, with rainfall ranging from moderate in the coastal regions to almost none at all in the desert.

Around the coastal areas, the weather does not vary as dramatically as it does inland. Climate is affected by factors such as latitude, topography, and proximity to water masses - primarily the Pacific Ocean, and southern California's mountain ranges. The Transverse Ranges and the Peninsular Ranges are key players in the region's climate.

Essentially, the mountain ranges separate southern California into two distinct climatic regions: The heavy-populated coastal area west of these mountains is the one most associated with the term "Southern California" and is characterized by pleasant weather all-year round, without frequent heat spells in the summer and without low temperatures in winter. By comparison, the area east of the ranges, between the mountains and the borders with Nevada and Arizona, is dominated by the Sonoran Desert and the Mojave Desert and tends to be more arid and register more extreme temperatures in both summer and winter.

=== Low clouds and fog ===
This is a common weather prediction for southern California. Due to the topographic features and proximity to the Pacific, southern California has its share of both low clouds and fog.

Coastal fogs are frequently generated by interaction between seasonal inversion layers and the coastal marine layer, and may reach as far inland as 20 miles, butting up against inland mountains or coastal mountain ranges. While fog generally is the collection of water droplets or ice crystals suspended in the air at or near the Earth's surface, southern California's fog varies from the light 'ground fogs' to a dense almost "Tule fog" (pronounced ˈtuːliː fog) in the Winter and Spring, depending on the interaction of cold air brought down from the local mountains and the warmer ocean air masses.

However, over the last few decades, clouds have become less prevalent on the coast, due to urban heat and climate change. When compared with data from the 1970s, scientists discovered that the stratus cloud cover has decreased between 25% and 50%.

=== "May Gray" and "June Gloom" ===
In contrast with the sunny summer, late spring in southern California is often overcast. This period, known to the locals as "May Gray" and "June Gloom", dims the coastal skies of sunny southern California. During this time, the coastal clouds may remain all day, but often give way to some hazy afternoon sunshine. The number of gloomy days during this period vary from year to year. Years with warmer ocean temperatures, influenced by the broader El Niño weather pattern, may result in fewer gray days in June, whereas the cooler ocean temperatures associated with a La Niña pattern, usually foretell more gray days in the season.

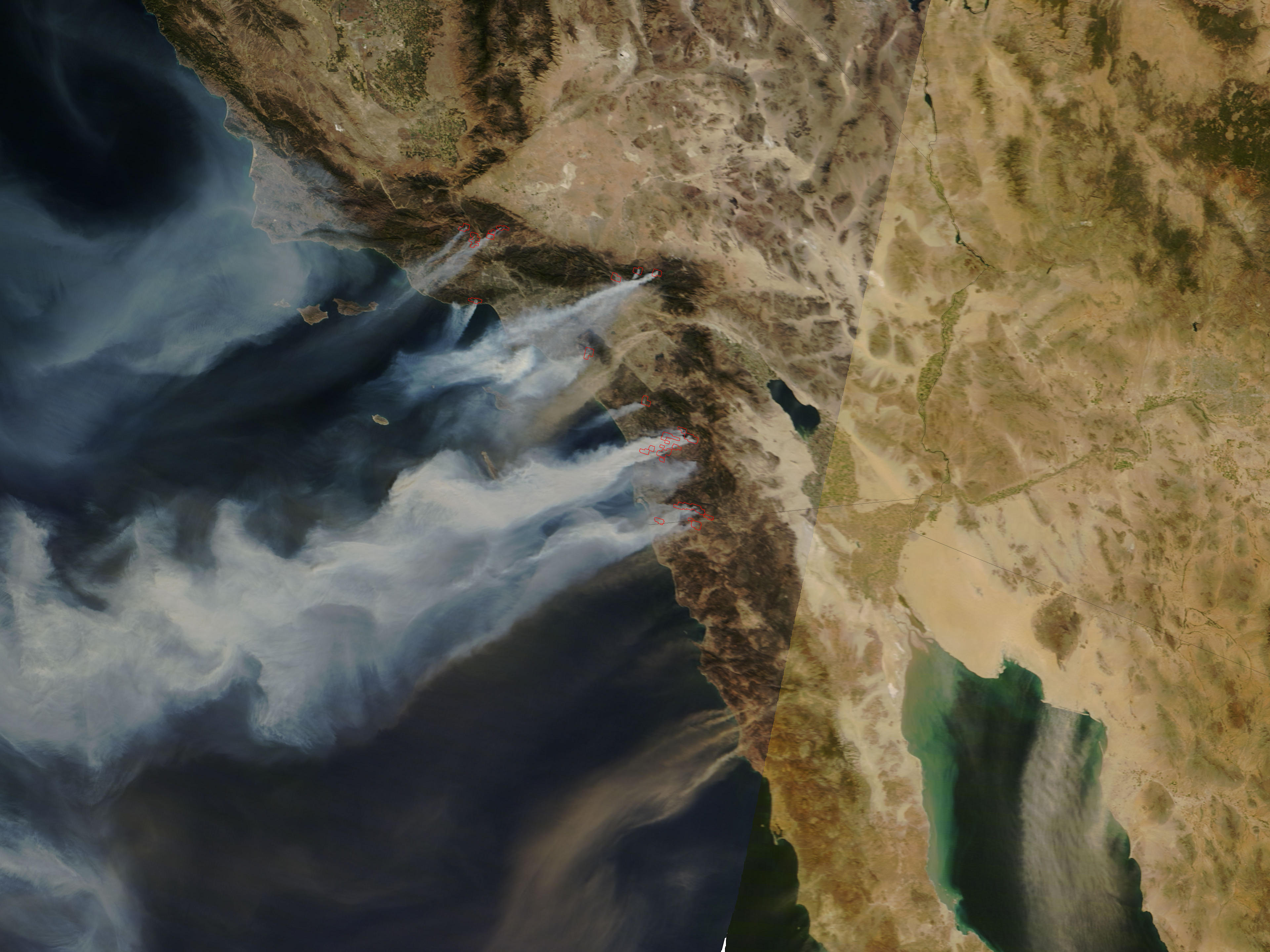
Santa Ana winds in California expand fires and spreads smoke over hundreds of miles, as in this October 2007 satellite image.

=== Wildfires ===
Because of the hot, dry and windy nature of southern California, wildfires are common. While most of them only affect small areas, wildfire can quickly get out of control and spread across large areas of woodland, particularly when fanned by the Santa Ana winds. Hot and extremely dry, they are also known as "Devil winds", and descend on the coastal region from the continental interior of the American West, increasing in temperature as they approach the ocean.

Natural wildfires are more likely to appear towards the end of long, dry summers, so they have become a more serious problem in recent years because of climate change, which makes wildfires increasingly larger and more frequent. Namely, the January 2025 fires, the most destructive fires in Southern California’s history, was exacerbated in part by heavy rainfall followed by a long dry season. Climate change has also widened the wildfire "season" from a few summer months to virtually the entire year. At the same time, climate scientists are expecting that climate change will diminish the strength of the Santa Ana winds, potentially limiting its role in spreading wildfires.

== Physical geography ==
Other than the Pacific Coast, the Transverse Ranges and the Peninsular Ranges are the two most important physical landscapes in the region. Both ranges have their particular characteristics, from the trend of the mountains, to the different climates within each range.

The ellipse outlines the region of the California Transverse Ranges.

=== Transverse Ranges ===
The Transverse Ranges is a unique set of mountain ranges in California. They are the only mountain ranges that run west to east, as opposed to the rest of California’s ranges that run north to south. These mountain ranges run from Santa Barbara County into San Bernardino County. They derive the name Transverse Ranges due to their east-west orientation, making them transverse to the general north-south orientation of most of California's coastal mountain ranges.

==== Climate ====
The Transverse Ranges experience temperature differences from winter to summer of about 36 °F (20 °C). One factor contributing to this variability is the distance from the ocean: the eastern part of the Transverse Ranges is furthest from the coast and has the most drastic temperature variation, whereas the western part is closest to the ocean and therefore has less variance.

The amount of precipitation of any area is affected by elevation, and topography influences temperature within elevation ranges. The higher the elevation, the lower the temperatures, and with lower temperatures come increased precipitation. The highest point of the Ranges is Mt. San Gorgonio (11,503 feet) in the San Bernardino Mountains at the eastern end of the Ranges. The southeastern part of the Transverse Ranges can be considered to have a desert climate. Mountain ranges can cause a rain shadow effect, when air flow inland from the ocean and it rises, it begins to cool and after it reaches the other side of the mountain it becomes warm and evaporates. This is one of the reasons for the dry conditions in the Transverse Ranges that are furthest from the coast. The Ranges are also affected by the Santa Ana winds, a regional wind system created when air is forced from a high pressure to a low pressure, causing air to move from inland towards the ocean. These dry winds usually originate at the eastern end of the Ranges.

==== Geology ====
The San Andreas Fault and many other faults run through the Transverse Ranges. Because of this, this area is one of the most geologically active regions in California, with surface changes from fractions of an inch to six feet. Sedimentary rocks from the late Mesozoic era and early Cenozoic era are found in the western part of the region. Near the eastern ranges, such as the San Bernardino Mountains, metamorphic rocks that resemble rocks of the Sierra Nevada can be found.

==== Composite ranges ====
These east-to-west running ranges include a variety of different mountains. Some mountains are steep like the San Gabriel Mountains. Other areas of the Transverse Ranges have a very low elevation like the Mojave Desert. The mountains ranges comprising the Transverse ranges include:

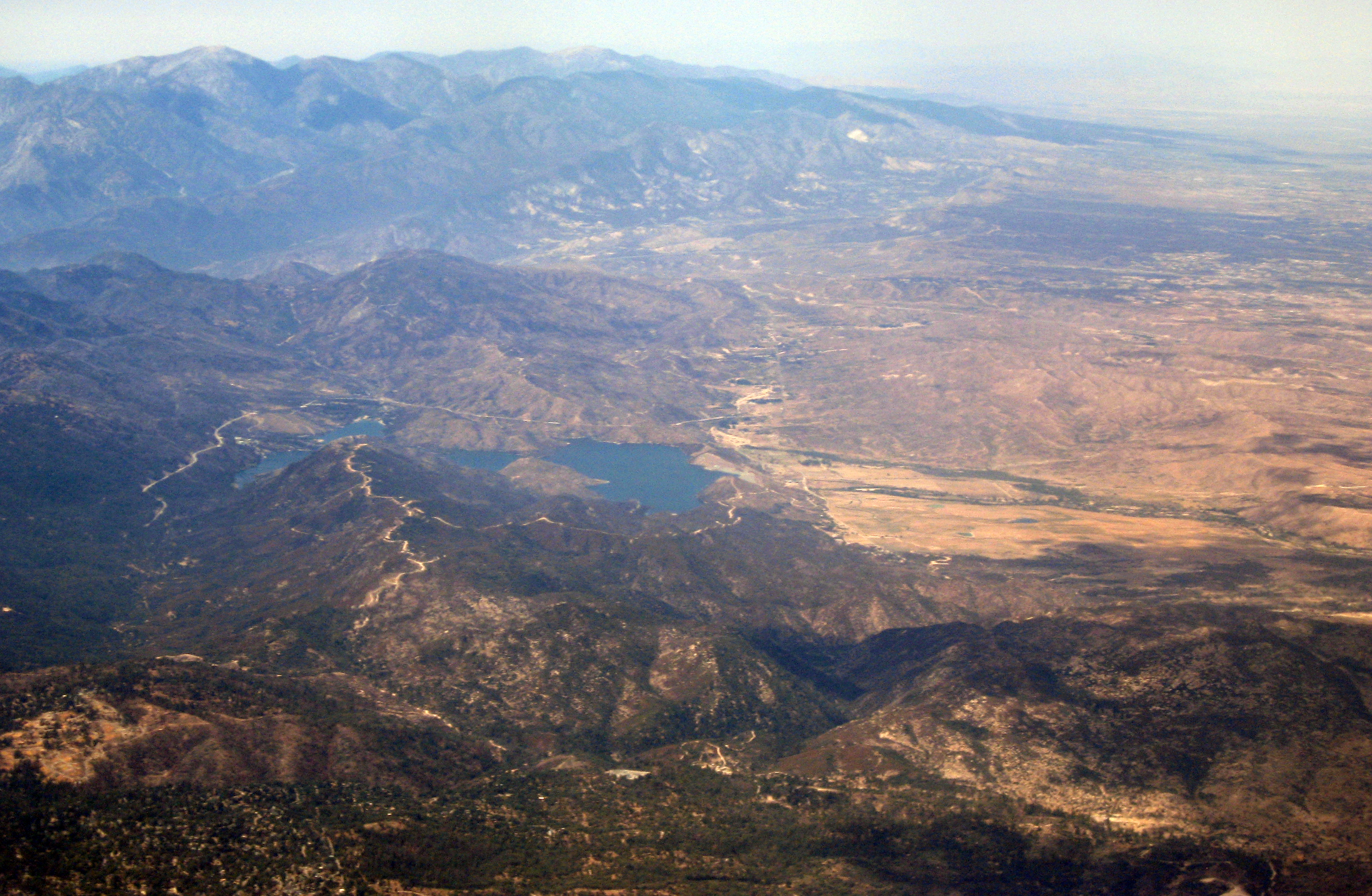
Transverse Ranges

- Santa Ynez Mountains
- San Rafael Mountains
- Sierra Madre Mountains
- Topatopa Mountains
- Santa Susana Mountains
- Simi Hills
- Chalk Hills
- Santa Monica Mountains
- San Gabriel Mountains
- San Rafael Hills
- Puente Hills
- San Jose Hills
- San Bernardino Mountains
- Little San Bernardino Mountains
- Tehachapi Mountains
- Sierra Pelona Mountains
- San Emigdio Mountains

==== Urban interaction ====
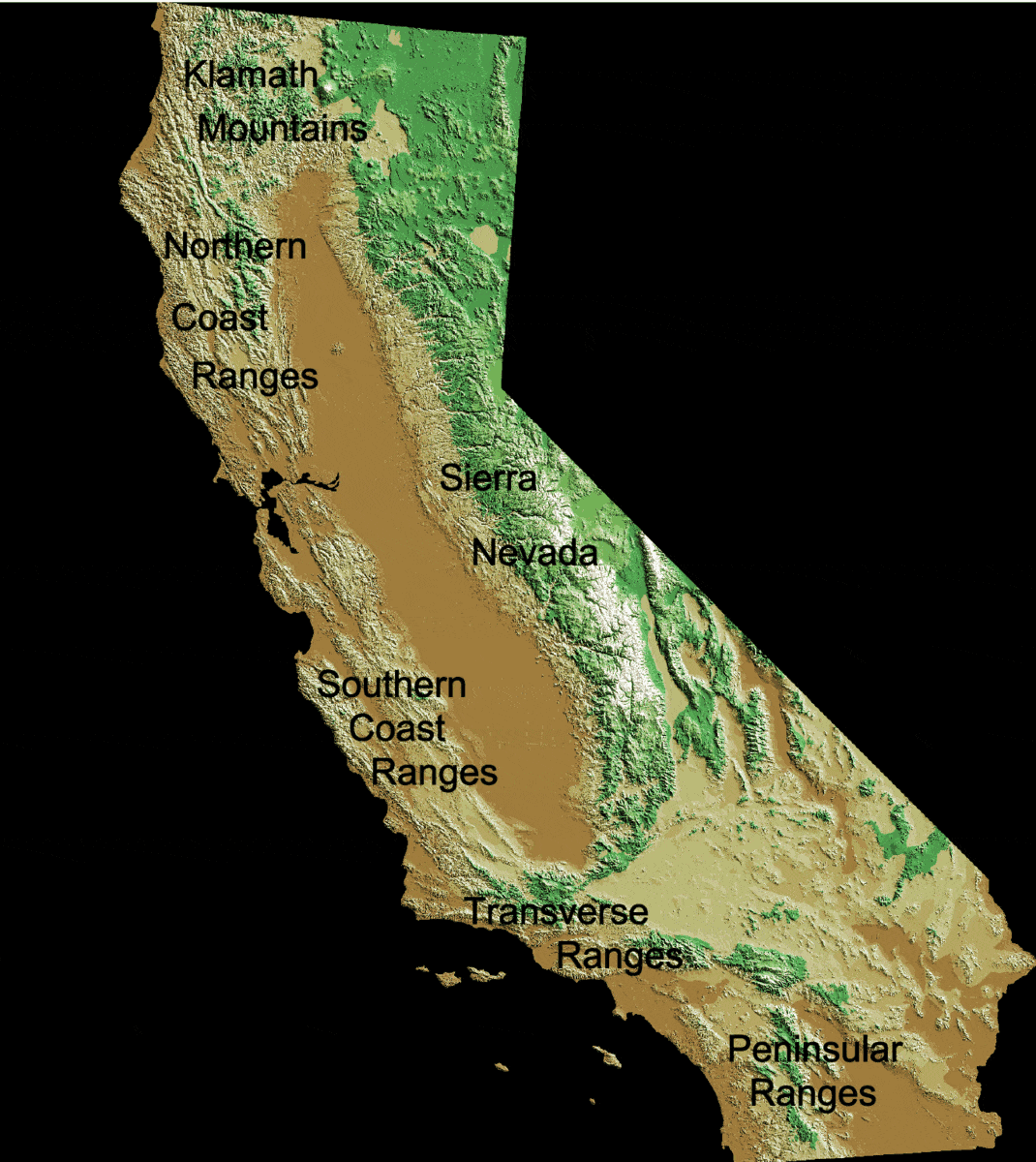
The Peninsular Ranges are the southernmost mountains in the California Coast Ranges

People have taken full advantage of the Transverse Ranges. The Ranges create a number of coastal plains and valleys which have become densely populated because of their prime living conditions. These valleys include Oxnard Plain, San Fernando Valley, Simi Valley, San Gabriel Valley, and the Inland Empire (formerly "Orange Empire"). The mountain ranges create recreation and living areas and have several ski resorts and provide several hiking and off-road vehicle use areas. Many people reside in the hills of the Transverse Ranges, where they may work locally or commute to work in more populated areas 'down the hill.' Such communities provide an alternative to city and suburban living in southern California.

=== Peninsular Ranges ===
The Peninsular Ranges are a group of mountain ranges in the Pacific Coast Ranges, which stretch over 900 miles from southern California in the United States to the southern tip of Mexico's Baja California peninsula. They are part of the North American Coast Ranges that run along the Pacific coast from Alaska to Mexico. Elevations range from 500 ft to 11,500 ft (150 m to 3,500 m) and vegetation in these ranges varies from coastal sage scrub to chaparral, and from oak woodland to conifer forest.

The Peninsular Ranges of Southern California include the Santa Ana Mountains, San Jacinto Mountains, and the Laguna Mountains. The Peninsular Ranges of Baja California include the Sierra Juarez, Sierra San Pedro Martir, Sierra de la Giganta, and Sierra de la Laguna. These ranges run from north to south.

The Santa Ana Mountains are the largest natural landscape along the coast of southern California. These mountains peak at about 5,689 feet, on Santiago Peak. This range starts in the north, in the Corona area heading southeast of the Puente Hills region.

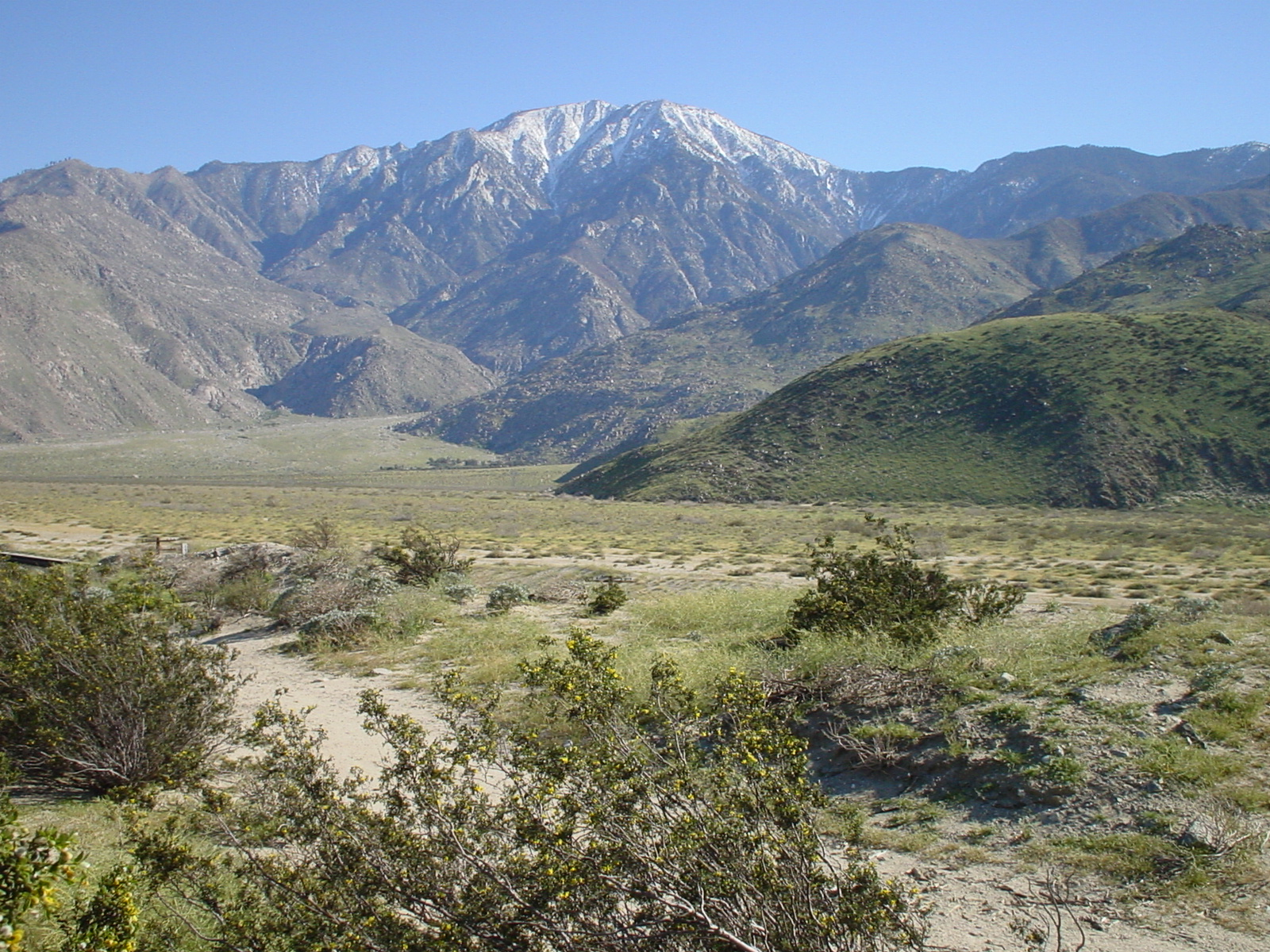
Peaks of the Peninsular Ranges

The San Jacinto Mountains are located in the desert areas in the north and east side of southern California. They peak at about 10,833 feet. They run from the San Bernardino Mountains southeast to the Santa Rosa Mountains. This mountain range is the northernmost part of the Peninsular Range.

The Santa Rosa Mountains are located at the southern end of the San Jacinto Mountains, where they connect to it. The range extends for approximately 30 miles (48 km) through Riverside, San Diego and Imperial counties, along the western side of the Coachella Valley, where they bound the Anza-Borrego portion of the Colorado Desert. The highest peak in the range is Toro Peak (8,717 feet).

The Laguna Mountains are located in the eastern part of San Diego County. They range northwest to southeast for approximately 20 miles and peak at Cuyapaipe Mountain (6,378 feet). These mountains extend northwest about 35 mi (56 km) from the Mexican border at the Sierra de Juárez. The Sonora Desert lies to the east and the Santa Rosa Mountains are to the northwest.

==== Climate ====
As with the Transverse Ranges, areas along the coast tend to have less temperature variation than do inland areas. The Peninsular Ranges also form a rain shadow on the Colorado Desert region of California and on much of the larger Sonora Desert. The ranges are affected by the marine layer that provides cooling temperatures and fog, and rainfall varies seasonally with tropical storm activity.
