= Kinneloa Fire =

1993 wildfire in Southern California

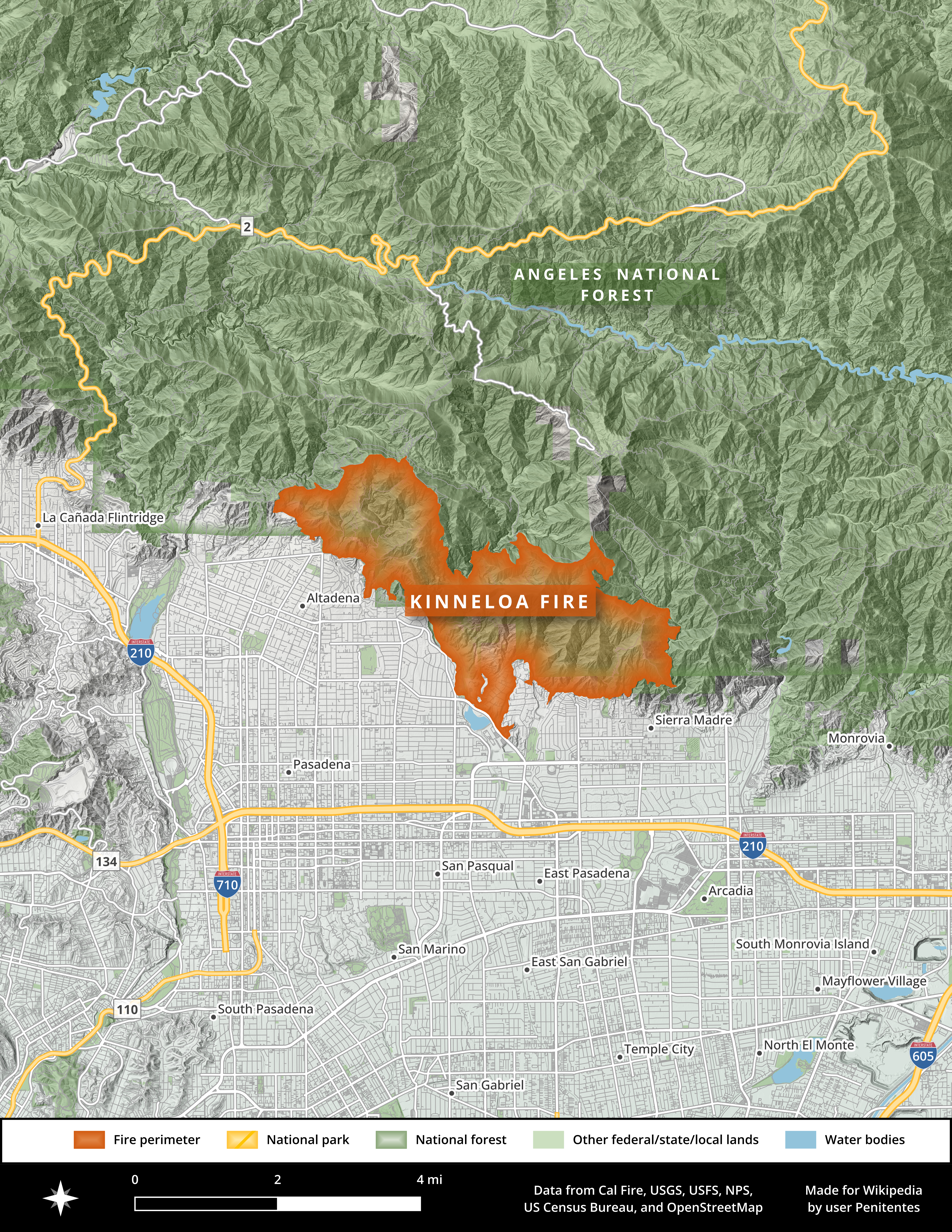
- The Kinneloa Fire burned in the San Gabriel Mtns. and into communities in the foothills.
- Date: October 27 –; November 1, 1993; (6 days)
- Location: Los Angeles County, Southern California, United States
- Coordinates: 34.189°N 118.098°W

Statistics
- Burned area: 5,485 acres (2,220 ha; 9 sq mi; 22 km^{2})

Impacts
- Deaths: 1
- Injuries: 38
- Evacuated: 2,500
- Structures destroyed: 196 (121 residential)
- Cost: $65.5 million; (equivalent to about $128 million in 2024)

Ignition
- Cause: Escaped campfire

Map
- Location of the Kinneloa Fire in Southern California

The Kinneloa Fire was a destructive wildfire in Los Angeles County, Southern California in October 1993. The fire destroyed 196 buildings in the communities of Altadena, Kinneloa Mesa, Pasadena and Sierra Madre in the foothills of the San Gabriel Mountains, becoming at the time the twelfth-most destructive wildfire in California's history and one of the most destructive wildfires in Los Angeles County history. The fire caused a multitude of minor injuries, one direct fatality, and two indirect fatalities.

The Kinneloa Fire began as an escaped campfire on October 27 and was driven by a combination of extremely dry and flammable vegetation, strong Santa Ana winds, and rugged topography. Nearly all of the structural losses occurred on the first day, and more favorable weather—along with the efforts of over 2,000 firefighters—kept the fire within the mountainous backcountry of the Angeles National Forest until it was declared fully contained on November 1, after 6 days.

The area of the Kinneloa Fire reburned just over 31 years later during the 2025 Eaton Fire, which as of 2026 was the second most destructive and fifth deadliest wildfire in California history.

== Background ==
By October 1993, California had experienced a full six years of severe drought between 1986 and 1992, which contributed to a build-up of dead and dry brush in Southern California. This was followed by a wet winter in 1992–1993, which allowed new grass and brush to grow in the spring and then dry out once more by October. Southern California mountain vegetation is rife with plant species like chamise and manzanita, which comprise chaparral, the flammable oils of which and resins slow to rot or decay make it one of the most fire-prone plant communities.

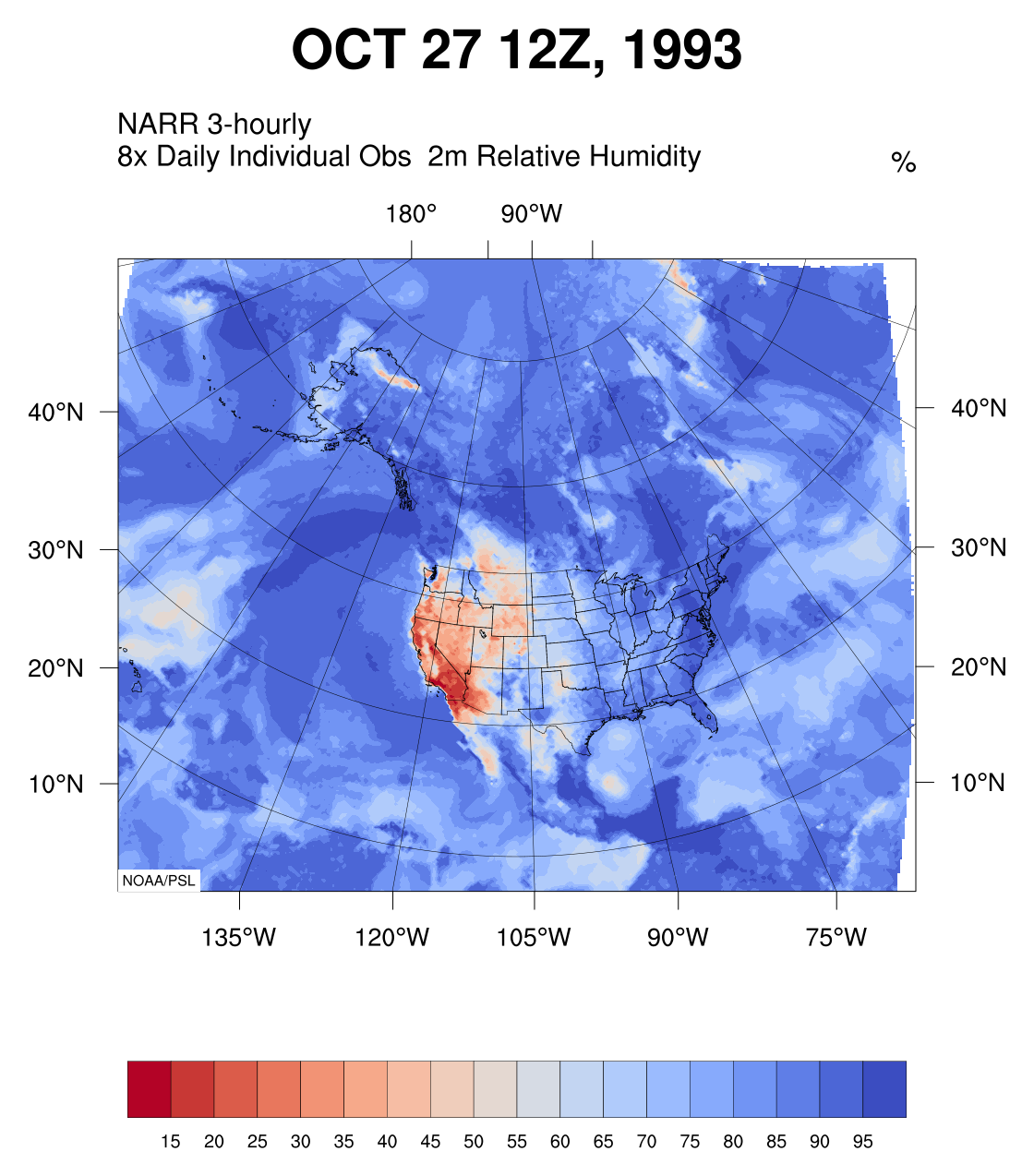
This map of relative humidity at 12Z (4:00 am. PDT, when the fire began) on Oct 27 shows widespread low RH levels across Southern California.

On October 27, 1993, the National Park Service morning report read:

Red flag warnings are in effect for low humidity and strong north to east winds in much of central and southern California. A red flag watch also remains in effect for low humidity and gusty winds in northern inland valleys. Initial attack and possible large fires are expected to continue in California due to these conditions.

The red flag warnings in Southern California were due to forecast Santa Ana winds—a regular meteorological phenomenon in the autumn, generated when a high-pressure system builds in the Great Basin. The system pushes air clockwise, downwards from the northeast into the Los Angeles Basin, heating and drying it as it descends. The airmass also accelerates as it is forced through gaps in the mountains or over ridges, creating strong downslope winds. Studies of historical charcoal records indicate that large wildfires driven by Santa Ana winds have long been a natural part of chaparral landscapes in Southern California, even accounting for human-driven changes in fire suppression and fire ignitions over time.

In addition to the forecast winds of 15–25 miles per hour (24–40 km/h), temperatures on October 27 were forecast to reach around 90 °F (32 °C). The overall resulting weather pattern concerned regional fire officials, and the Angeles National Forest was closed to recreational usage between October 27 and 29.

The Kinneloa Fire was one of a rash of wildfires that broke out across Southern California in late October 1993, most of them driven by the same episode of Santa Ana winds. These included the Laguna Fire in Orange County, the Green Meadow Fire in Ventura County, the Ortega Fire in Riverside County, and several others.

== Progression ==
=== October 27 ===
The Kinneloa Fire ignited before dawn on the morning of October 27, 1993. Andres Huang, 35, was homeless and sleeping in a small grove of pine trees adjacent to the Mount Wilson Toll Road, roughly halfway between Eaton Canyon and Henninger Flats, on the slopes of the San Gabriel Mountains above northeastern Altadena. Huang woke up cold and built a small fire from pine needles and twigs to warm himself, but the fire escaped the circle of stones he had lit it in almost immediately. He attempted to smother the fire, but it had grown too large, and Huang fled.

Los Angeles County Fire Department (LACFD) Station 66, located at the base of Eaton Canyon, received the first call about the fire at 3:48 a.m. PDT. It quickly became clear that what was dispatched as the Kinneloa Fire had the potential to become a major incident. LACFD requested the assistance of the Pasadena Fire Department within seven minutes of the initial call, and shortly thereafter both departments entered unified command with the Forest Service. County firefighters arrived on scene by 3:56 a.m., reporting a two-acre (0.81 ha) "creeping" fire in steep terrain. The Forest Service requested two helicopters for dropping water at first light. By 4:45 a.m., the fire was still only three acres (1.2 ha).

The fire's behavior quickly changed as the sun rose and the forecast Santa Ana winds arrived. Wind gusts of up to 40–60 miles per hour (64–97 km/h) spread the fire rapidly. The incident command requested air tankers. Around 5:30 a.m., the fire trapped and overran 15 firefighters on the toll road, though the deployment of fire shelters prevented any serious injuries. The fire moved down through Eaton Canyon, and evacuations in nearby neighborhoods began. At 5:45 a.m., firefighters' incident command post near Midwick Drive and Altadena Drive burned over, and had to be re-established at Eaton Canyon Nature Center. By 6:00 a.m., the incident commanders were ordering strike teams of five fire engines for structure protection. The fire reached the arroyo at the bottom of Eaton Canyon between 6:00 a.m. and 6:30 a.m. When it reached the arroyo, the fire split into two main flanks: one moved west towards Altadena, and the other south towards Canyon Close Road. At around 6:10 a.m., the incident command post's new location at the Nature Center burned over again. Evacuations were ordered for approximately 2,000 residents between Sierra Madre to the east and Altadena to the west. Saint Luke's Medical Center was included, resulting in the evacuation of at least 125 patients as well as at least 50 residents from nearby nursing homes. Temporary shelters were established at several local public schools, including Eliot Middle School, Wilson Middle School, and John Muir High School.

The incident command post relocated to Victory Park. Even as Los Angeles County Fire Department helicopters arrived on scene to drop water, structures in Altadena began to burn at 6:45 a.m. At the same time, the southern flank of the fire moved east, driven by the winds towards Kinneloa Mesa. The unincorporated community of Kinneloa Mesa consists of residential neighborhoods of single-family homes, sitting atop a broad mesa that emerges where the San Gabriel Mountains' foothills flatten out, carved by multiple steep canyons that drop down to Eaton Canyon on the west side and the neighborhoods of Pasadena Glen and Sierra Madre on the east side. The neighborhood contains many narrow streets (some only 18 feet (5.5 m) wide) and multiple dead ends, making it a dangerous environment for firefighters—the Pasadena Star-News called them "deathtraps". According to the Star-News, the chimney-like effect of the strong winds and pre-heating blew the fire up the canyon sides and into Kinneloa Mesa in just 90 seconds. Many homes, particularly those on the edges of the canyon, quickly caught fire. By 7:15 a.m., the fire was 300 acres (120 ha), and by 8:15 a.m., more than 600 acres (240 ha). As the fire's behavior intensified, it burned as many as 300 acres (120 ha) every 10 minutes.

At 8:00 a.m., thick smoke shorted out power lines in Kinneloa Mesa. This cut power to one of the water reservoirs operated by the Kinneloa Irrigation District, the local water company. Because the mesa rose above the surrounding terrain, keeping the reservoirs full required pumping water from wells further downhill. Without the power lines, and with no backup generators installed for lack of funds, the District could not maintain water pressure for long in the Kinneloa neighborhoods. While helicopters continued to drop water, refilling near Verdugo Hills Hospital in La Cañada Flintridge, fixed-wing air tankers were unable to fly in the high winds after 9:30 a.m. And as the day went on, other wildfires in Southern California grew into major incidents with resource demands of their own: 25 engine companies that had come from Orange County left for the Laguna Fire under a mutual aid clause that allowed them to return in case of emergency. (Note: The source text says that the 25 engine companies were released at 11:00 a.m. to the Laguna Fire. However, the Laguna Fire was not reported until shortly before noon.) The Kinneloa Irrigation District water tanks were empty by 11:45 a.m., leaving firefighters unable to connect to fire hydrants in the upper parts of Kinneloa Mesa. By noon, the fire was approximately 4,000 acres (1,600 ha). Structures continued to burn throughout the afternoon along the fire's eight-mile (13 km) perimeter, even as multiple homeowners stayed back to protect their properties with whatever they had on hand. The neighborhood of Pasadena Glen, below Kinneloa Mesa's eastern flank, went largely undefended; 27 homes burned there.

The Santa Ana winds subsided in the afternoon. Firefighters took advantage of the respite, and by 5:00 p.m., most of the spot fires in Kinneloa Mesa were extinguished. Near sunset, firefighters made two simultaneous stands: 39 engines arrayed at Rubio Canyon stopped the fire there, though several homes were lost on Zane Grey Terrace, and more firefighters grouped at Park Vista Drive above Sierra Madre. After two hours of structure defense and setting backfires, they were able to prevent the fire from progressing into the neighborhoods to their south.

=== October 28 to 31 ===
The National Weather Service forecast a return to Santa Ana winds on October 30–31: though weaker than the October 27–28 episode, it still concerned firefighters because multiple fires, including the Kinneloa Fire, remained uncontained. However, to the gratitude of fire officials, the predicted gusts of 40 miles per hour (64 km/h) did not materialize.

The fire was 50 percent contained by the night of October 29, as firefighters shored up multiple flanks: to the west, above Altadena, they set a 200-acre (81 ha) backfire to strengthen control lines along Chaney Trail, which stopped the fire from continuing into Millard Canyon and threatening Jet Propulsion Laboratory and The Meadows subdivision. To the east, they used dozers to widen a large firebreak on the ridge between Little Santa Anita Canyon, with the most fire activity, and Big Santa Anita Canyon, which contained dozens of summer cabins and from which the fire might have threatened Sierra Madre. These efforts were supported by aircraft dropping water and fire retardant, including Boeing CH-47 Chinook helicopters—their use a first for Los Angeles County—and Lockheed C-130 Hercules fixed-wing aircraft.

By October 31, the fire was 95 percent contained, and on November 1, the Kinneloa Fire was declared 100 percent contained. At peak staffing, at least 2,100 firefighters had worked to contain it.

== Effects ==
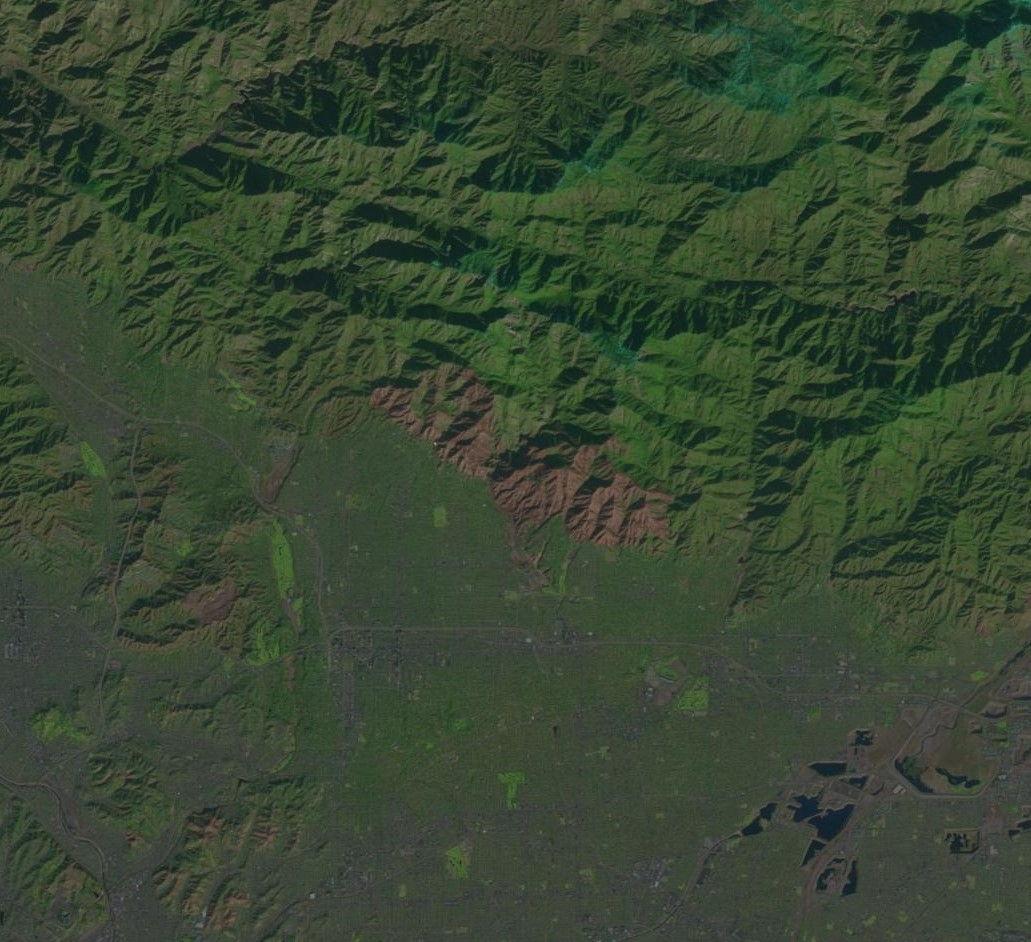
This false-color Landsat 5 satellite image from NASA & USGS shows the Kinneloa burn scar on December 16, 1993.

=== Casualties ===
The Kinneloa Fire caused at least 38 minor injuries, at least 29 of them to firefighters. Most of the firefighter injuries were among crews cutting firebreaks by hand on the hillsides, though none of them were serious. The only direct death from the fire was Alfred Wagner, 98, who died on November 9 of pneumonia. The Sheriff's Department reported the death was caused by complications from smoke inhalation that occurred on October 27, when Wagner attempted to defend his home near Eaton Canyon with a garden hose before being made to evacuate by his caretaker. The Los Angeles County District Attorney's office considered bringing involuntary manslaughter charges against Huang for Wagner's death but ultimately declined to do so.

Two fatalities occurred when, after rains the following March, a father and son on a hike were killed by debris flows in a narrow canyon in the burn area above Sierra Madre. John Henderson, 33, and Matthew Henderson, 9, were on an outing in Bailey Canyon when a presumed cloudburst over the burn area led to a sudden and violent flash flood. The pair were swept into the Bailey Canyon Wilderness Park debris basin, and an exhaustive day-and-night excavation using bulldozers, backhoes, and dump trucks took 15 days to locate their remains under 18 feet (5.5 m) of mud. Arguing that the Kinneloa Fire was a proximate cause of the debris flow, Los Angeles County officials applied for aid from the Federal Emergency Management Agency (FEMA) to fund the search.

=== Damage ===
The fire ultimately burned 196 structures. Of these, 121 were houses, including the Pasadena home of football coach Johnnie Lynn and the former residence of naturalist John Burroughs. An additional 40 homes were damaged. Dozens of vehicles were also destroyed. The fire impinged on, but did not burn, the ranch and art colony of bohemian artist Jirayr Zorthian in Altadena. Many houses that burned in the Kinneloa Fire were highlighted by firefighters as being particularly susceptible to destruction because of their flammable wood shingle roofs. Cal Fire officials and others called the Kinneloa Fire an example of the "fire of the future", referring to wildfires burning near inhabited areas that could not be countered with common indirect firefighting tactics.

Multiple California politicians, including Senator Dianne Feinstein and Governor of California Pete Wilson, came to survey the damage in Altadena and Kinneloa Mesa. Wilson declared a state of emergency in Los Angeles County and compared the neighborhoods devastated by the Kinneloa Fire to the aftermath of the Oakland fire. In response to the wildfire outbreak, on October 28 President Bill Clinton declared five California counties disaster areas, including Los Angeles County, and promised federal assistance. He sent FEMA director James Lee Witt, Secretary of the Interior Bruce Babbitt, and Secretary of Agriculture Mike Espy to Southern California to help coordinate emergency management and recovery efforts. The Kinneloa Fire cost approximately $65.5 million (~$128 million in 2024), with $58.5 million (~$114.4 million in 2024) sustained in losses, plus nearly $7 million (~$14 million in 2024) spent on the suppression of the fire.

At the time, the Kinneloa Fire was the twelfth most destructive wildfire in recorded California history. As of 2026, it was the 11th most destructive wildfire in the history of Los Angeles County.

=== Post-fire landscape impacts ===
After the fire, more than 63 miles (101 km) of recreational trails and roads in Angeles National Forest were closed and not reopened until spring. Less than a week after the fire, county workers spread a mixture of seeds over 3,900 acres (1,600 ha) of the burn area. The seed mix included California poppies, deer weed, 'Cucamonga' California brome, rose clover, and rye grass, the last of which environmentalists opposed because it was not native to the area. The process was deemed necessary because of the risk of floods and debris flows: according to a member of the government rehabilitation team for the Kinneloa Fire burn area, approximately 80 percent of the footprint burned at a high severity, leaving no vegetation to help hold the steep hillsides together.

Rainfall in November, shortly after the fire, caused mudslides in the fire scars across Southern California. Fire departments distributed tens of thousands of sandbags in the San Gabriel Valley. In the March following the fire, the National Weather Service issued flash flood warnings for parts of Altadena and Sierra Madre at risk from debris flows from the burn area. Many residents evacuated, including most of the residents of Pasadena Glen, a canyon neighborhood immediately east of Kinneloa Mesa. Around 2,000 cubic yards (1,500 m^{3}) of material collected in the Kinneloa debris retention basin, one of several, over the following winter.

== Legal proceedings ==
Sheriff's deputies found and arrested Huang at 6:45 a.m., more than three hours after the fire had started, and he was arraigned on October 29. He was injured from running down the hillside through brush, disoriented, and severely dehydrated. He also spoke no English, complicating efforts by police to understand his story.

Born in China, Huang had been a successful local official but was disillusioned by Chinese Communist Party crackdowns following the 1989 Tiananmen Square protests and massacre. He fled to Peru, leaving behind a wife and daughter, and worked for an electronics company in Lima. In 1993 he volunteered to establish a U.S. branch of the company and arrived in Los Angeles with a worker's visa. While staying in a hotel, Huang fell and suffered a major head injury, losing consciousness. Over the following weeks he began experiencing severe paranoia and recurring blackouts, losing his job. Huang could not even recall how he had ended up on the mountainside where he started the campfire. Metropolitan State Hospital psychiatrists later diagnosed Huang with multiple conditions, including major depression, schizophrenia, and brain lesions.

On November 29, Huang pled no contest to the misdemeanor charge of starting an illegal open fire. He remained in a mental hospital until his sentencing in December. On December 21, Huang was released from jail and sentenced to three years of probation under the condition that he receive treatment at a residential treatment center.

== See also ==
- Station Fire (2009), Bobcat Fire (2020), and Eaton Fire (2025), subsequent wildfires in the area
