= Santa Ana winds =

California weather phenomenon

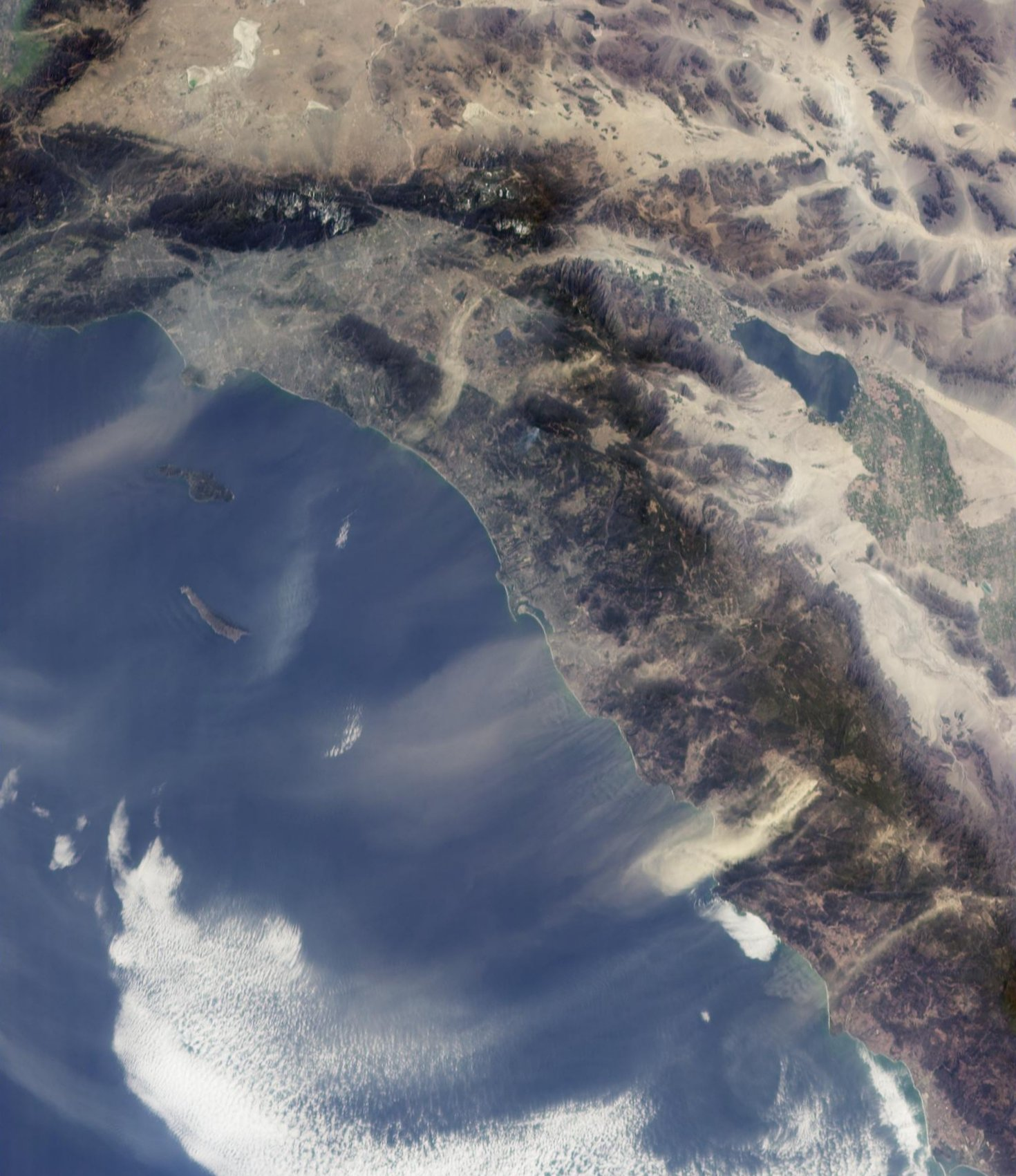
The Santa Ana winds sweep down from the deserts and across coastal Southern California, pushing dust and smoke from wildfires far out over the Pacific Ocean. Los Angeles is in the upper left of this image, while San Diego is near the center.

The Santa Ana winds, occasionally referred to as the devil winds, are strong, extremely dry katabatic winds that originate inland and affect coastal Southern California and northern Baja California. They originate from cool, dry high-pressure air masses in the Great Basin.

Santa Ana winds are known for the hot, dry weather that they bring in autumn (often the hottest of the year), but they can also arise at other times of the year. They often bring the lowest relative humidities of the year to coastal Southern California, and "beautifully clear skies". These low humidities, combined with the warm, compressionally heated air mass and high wind speeds, create critical fire weather conditions that fan destructive wildfires.

Typically, about 10 to 25 Santa Ana wind events occur annually. A Santa Ana wind can blow from one to seven days, with an average wind event lasting three days. The longest recorded Santa Ana event was a 14-day wind in November 1957. Damage from high winds is most common along the Santa Ana River basin in Orange County, the Santa Clara River basin in Ventura and Los Angeles County, through Newhall Pass into the San Fernando Valley of Los Angeles County, and through the Cajon Pass into San Bernardino County near San Bernardino, Fontana, and Chino.

The Santa Ana Winds drive most wildfires in Southern California. Most recently, the winds are known as the force behind the January 2025 Southern California wildfires, having gone on and off for 24 days, starting on January 6, 2025 and ending on January 31st.

== Description ==
=== Meteorology ===
The Santa Anas are katabatic winds (Greek for "flowing downhill") arising in higher altitudes and blowing down towards sea level. The National Weather Service defines Santa Ana winds as "a weather condition [in southern California] in which strong, hot, dust-bearing winds descend to the Pacific Coast around Los Angeles from inland desert regions".

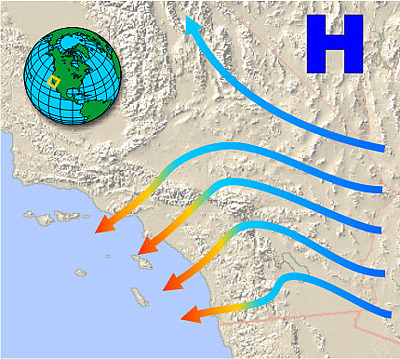
This map illustration shows a characteristic high-pressure area centered over the Great Basin, with the clockwise anticyclone wind flow out of the high-pressure center giving rise to a Santa Ana wind event as the airmass flows through the passes and canyons of Southern California, manifesting as a dry northeasterly wind.

Santa Ana winds originate from high-pressure airmasses over the Great Basin and upper Mojave Desert. Any low-pressure area over the Pacific Ocean, off the coast of California, can change the stability of the Great Basin High, causing a pressure gradient that turns the synoptic scale winds southward down the eastern side of the Sierra Nevada and into the Southern California region. According to one meteorology journal, "a popular rule of thumb used by forecasters is to measure the difference in pressure between the Los Angeles International Airport and Las Vegas; a difference of 9 millibars (0.27 inches of mercury) is enough to support a Santa Ana event."

Dry air flows outward in a clockwise spiral from the high pressure center. This dry airmass sweeps across the deserts of eastern California toward the coast, and encounters the towering Transverse Ranges, which separate coastal Southern California from the deserts. The airmass, flowing from high pressure in the Great Basin to a low pressure center off the coast, takes the path of least resistance by channeling through the mountain passes to the lower coastal elevations, as the low pressure area off the coast pulls the airmass offshore.

Mountain passes which channel these winds include the Soledad Pass, the Cajon Pass, and the San Gorgonio Pass, all well known for increasing Santa Anas as they are funneled through. This increase in speed, often to near-gale force or above is due to the Venturi effect of the passes. At the same time, as the air descends from higher elevation to lower, the temperature and barometric pressure increase adiabatically, warming about 5 °F for each 1,000 feet it descends (1 °C for each 100 m). Relative humidity decreases with the increasing temperature. The air has already been dried by orographic lift before reaching the Great Basin, as well as by subsidence from the upper atmosphere, so this additional warming often causes relative humidity to fall below 10 percent.

The end result is a strong, warm, and very dry wind blowing out of the bottom of mountain passes into the valleys and coastal plain. These warm, dry winds, which can easily exceed 40 miles per hour (64 km/h), can severely exacerbate brush or forest fires, especially under drought conditions.

During Santa Ana conditions it is typically hotter along the coast than in the deserts, with the Southern California coastal region reaching some of its highest annual temperatures in autumn rather than summer. Frigid, dry arctic air from Canada tends to create the most intense Santa Ana winds.

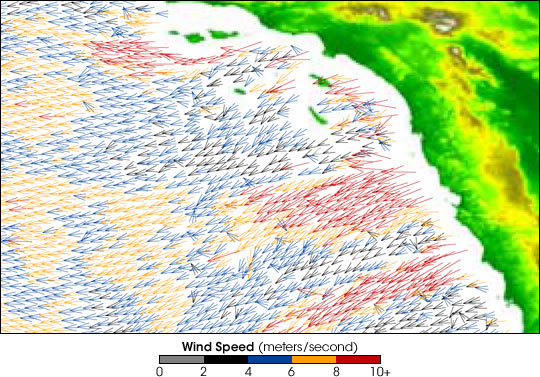
QuikSCAT image showing the speed of the Santa Ana winds (m/s)

While the Santa Anas are katabatic, they are not Föhn winds. These result from precipitation on the windward side of a mountain range which releases latent heat into the atmosphere which is then warmer on the leeward side (e.g., the Chinook or the original Föhn).

If the Santa Anas are strong, the usual day-time sea breeze may not arise, or develop weak later in the day because the strong offshore desert winds oppose the on-shore sea breeze. At night, the Santa Ana Winds merge with the land breeze blowing from land to sea and strengthen because the inland desert cools more than the ocean due to differences in the heat capacity and because there is no competing sea breeze.

Santa Ana winds are associated in the public mind with dry hot weather, but cold Santa Anas not only exist but have a strong correlation with the highest "regionally averaged" wind speeds.

=== Regional impacts ===
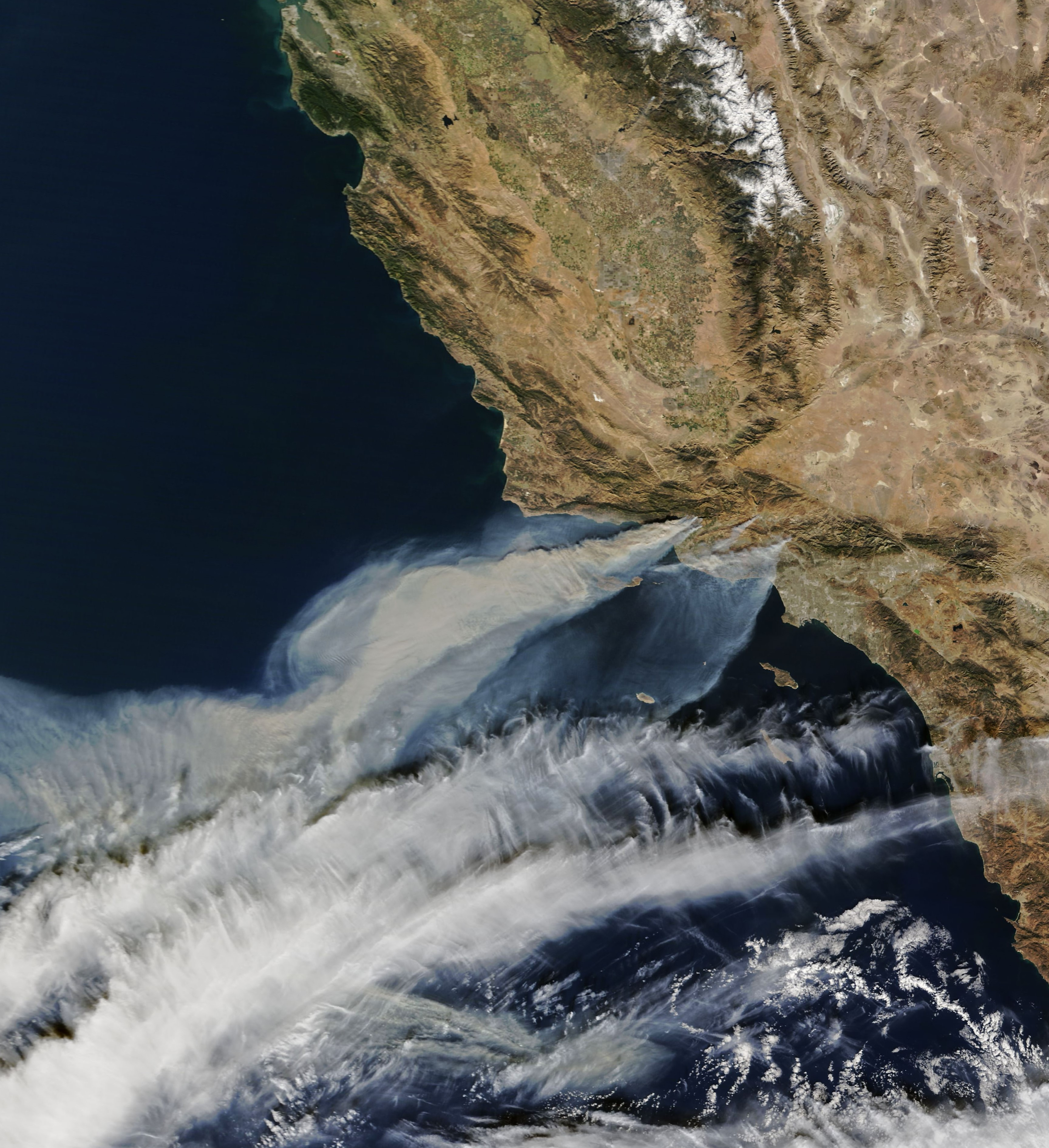
The Thomas Fire and two other fires burn out of control near Ventura in December 2017, with a strong Santa Ana wind driving the flames toward the coast and blowing the smoke offshore.

Santa Ana winds often bring the lowest relative humidities of the year to coastal Southern California. These low humidities, combined with the warm, compressionally heated air mass, plus the high wind speeds, create critical fire weather conditions. The combination of wind, heat, and dryness accompanying the Santa Ana winds turns the chaparral into explosive fuel feeding the infamous wildfires for which the region is known.

Although the winds often have a destructive nature, they have some benefits as well. They cause cold water to rise from below the surface layer of the ocean, bringing with it many nutrients that ultimately benefit local fisheries. As the winds blow over the ocean, sea surface temperatures drop about 4°C (7°F), indicating the upwelling. Chlorophyll concentrations in the surface water go from negligible, in the absence of winds, to very active at more than 1.5 milligrams per cubic meter in the presence of the winds.

==== Local maritime impacts ====
During the Santa Ana winds, large ocean waves can develop. These waves come from a northeasterly direction toward the normally sheltered sides of the Channel Islands, including commonly visited Catalina and Santa Cruz islands. Normally well-sheltered harbors and anchorages such as Avalon and Two Harbors can develop high surf and strong winds that can tear boats from their moorings. During Santa Ana conditions, it is advised that boaters moor on the Southern side of affected islands or return to the mainland.

== Related phenomena ==
=== Santa Ana fog ===
A Santa Ana fog is a derivative phenomenon in which a ground fog settles in coastal Southern California at the end of a Santa Ana wind episode. When Santa Ana conditions prevail, with winds in the lower 2 to 3 kilometers (1.2 to 1.9 mi) of the atmosphere from the north through east, the air over the coastal basin is extremely dry, and this dry air extends out over offshore waters of the Pacific Ocean. When the Santa Ana winds cease, the cool and moist marine layer may re-form rapidly over the ocean if conditions are right. The air in the marine layer becomes very moist and very low clouds or fog occurs. If wind gradients turn on-shore with enough strength, this sea fog is blown onto the coastal areas. This marks a sudden and surprising transition from the hot, dry Santa Ana conditions to cool, moist, and gray marine weather, as the Santa Ana fog can blow onshore and envelop cities in as quickly as fifteen minutes. However, a true Santa Ana fog is rare, because it requires conditions conducive to rapid re-forming of the marine layer, plus a rapid and strong reversal in wind gradients from off-shore to on-shore winds. More often, the high pressure system over the Great Basin, which caused the Santa Ana conditions in the first place, is slow to weaken or move east across the United States. In this more usual case, the Santa Ana winds cease, but warm, dry conditions under a stationary air mass continue for days or even weeks after the Santa Ana wind event ends.

A related phenomenon occurs when the Santa Ana condition is present but weak, allowing hot dry air to accumulate in the inland valleys that may not push all the way to sea level. Under these conditions auto commuters can drive from the San Fernando Valley where conditions are sunny and warm, over the low Santa Monica Mountains, to plunge into the cool cloudy air, low clouds, and fog characteristic of the marine air mass. This and the "Santa Ana fog" above constitute examples of an air inversion.

=== Sundowner winds ===
The similar winds in the Santa Barbara and Goleta area occur most frequently in the late spring to early summer, and are strongest at sunset, or "sundown"; hence their name: sundowner. Because high pressure areas usually migrate east, changing the pressure gradient in Southern California to the northeast, it is common for "sundowner" wind events to precede Santa Ana events by a day or two.

== Historical impact ==
Hygrometer showing low humidity during a Santa Ana wind event

The Santa Ana winds and the accompanying raging wildfires have been a part of the ecosystem of the Los Angeles Basin for over 5,000 years, dating back to the earliest habitation of the region by the Tongva and Tataviam peoples. The Santa Ana winds have been recognized and reported in English-language records as a weather phenomenon in Southern California since at least the mid-nineteenth century. During the Mexican–American War, Commodore Robert Stockton reported that a "strange, dust-laden windstorm" arrived in the night while his troops were marching south through California in January 1847. Various episodes of hot, dry winds have been described over this history as dust storms, hurricane-force winds, and violent north-easters, damaging houses and destroying fruit orchards. Newspaper archives have many photographs of regional damage dating back to the beginnings of news reporting in Los Angeles. When the Los Angeles Basin was primarily an agricultural region, the winds were feared particularly by farmers for their potential to destroy crops.

The strongest Santa Ana winds yet recorded occurred in early December 2011. An atmospheric set-up occurred that allowed the towns of Pasadena and Altadena in the San Gabriel Valley to get whipped by strong winds with a recorded maximum gust of 97 mph (156 km/h) at Whitaker Peak at an elevation of 4100 feet.

=== Wildfires ===
Because they are simultaneously "gusty" and "desiccating", the Santa Ana winds are highly associated with regional wildfire danger. The winds have been implicated in some of the area's (and even the state's) largest and deadliest wildfires.

Firemen run up Mt. Washington hill to put down wildfire flames in Los Angeles, 1961 (Los Angeles Times Photographic Collection, UCLA Library)

Major Santa Ana-fueled fires prior to 2000 included the Santiago Canyon Fire (1889), Bel Air Fire (1961), Agoura-Malibu firestorm (1978), Anaheim Fire (1982), Laguna Fire (1970), Laguna Fire (1993), and Kinneloa Fire (1993).

Major Santa Ana-fueled fires from 2000 to 2019 included Cedar Fire (2003), Old Fire (2003), Esperanza Fire (2006), Witch Creek Fire (2007), October 2007 California wildfires, Tea Fire (2008), Sayre Fire (2008), Freeway Complex Fire (2008), May 2014 San Diego County wildfires, December 2017 Southern California wildfires, and the Thomas Fire (2018).

Major Santa Ana-fueled fires from 2020 to present include the El Dorado Fire (2020), Bobcat Fire (2020), and Franklin Fire (2024). The Santa Ana winds heavily aggravated a series of wildfires in January 2025 including the Eaton Fire and the Palisades Fire during an exceptionally strong wind event. These fires burned through over 35,000 acres (14,163 ha) and have killed 24 people. The winds aggravating the fires reached over 80 miles per hour (130 km/h) in some areas, with wind speeds comparable to that of a Category 1 hurricane.

A 2025 climate modeling study by You and Delworth projected that Santa Ana winds could become about 7-11% less frequent by the end of the 21st century under a high-emissions scenario. However, the study also found that future Santa Ana wind events could produce drier atmospheric conditions, with higher vapor pressure deficits potentially increasing wildfire risk in coastal Southern California.

== Health effects ==
The winds carry Coccidioides immitis and Coccidioides posadasii spores into nonendemic areas, a pathogenic fungus that causes Coccidioidomycosis ("Valley Fever"). Symptomatic infection (40 percent of cases) usually presents as an influenza-like illness with fever, cough, headaches, rash, and myalgia (muscle pain). Serious complications include severe pneumonia, lung nodules, and disseminated disease, where the fungus spreads throughout the body. The disseminated form of Coccidioidomycosis can devastate the body, causing skin ulcers, abscesses, bone lesions, severe joint pain, heart inflammation, urinary tract problems, meningitis, and often death.

== Name etymology ==
The name Santa Ana winds comes from the Santa Ana Canyon in Orange County, one of the many locations where the winds blow intensely. Santa Ana Canyon and Santa Ana River, the old Spanish land grant Rancho Santiago de Santa Ana, and the town of Santa Ana are all so named because the Portolá expedition entered the river valley on Saint Anne's feast day in 1769. Newspaper references to the name Santa Ana winds appear as far back the 1870s and 1880s. Per the Riverside Press-Enterprise in 2020:

According to research done by Orange County historian Chris Jepsen, the first reported reference to that term comes to us in 1871 from the Anaheim Gazette. To anyone in what would become Orange County at the time, the winds seem to come out of Santa Ana Canyon, hence the name. However, having Santa Ana winds named for their city did not please the members of the Chamber of Commerce in the city of Santa Ana, and they fought for years to get the name changed.

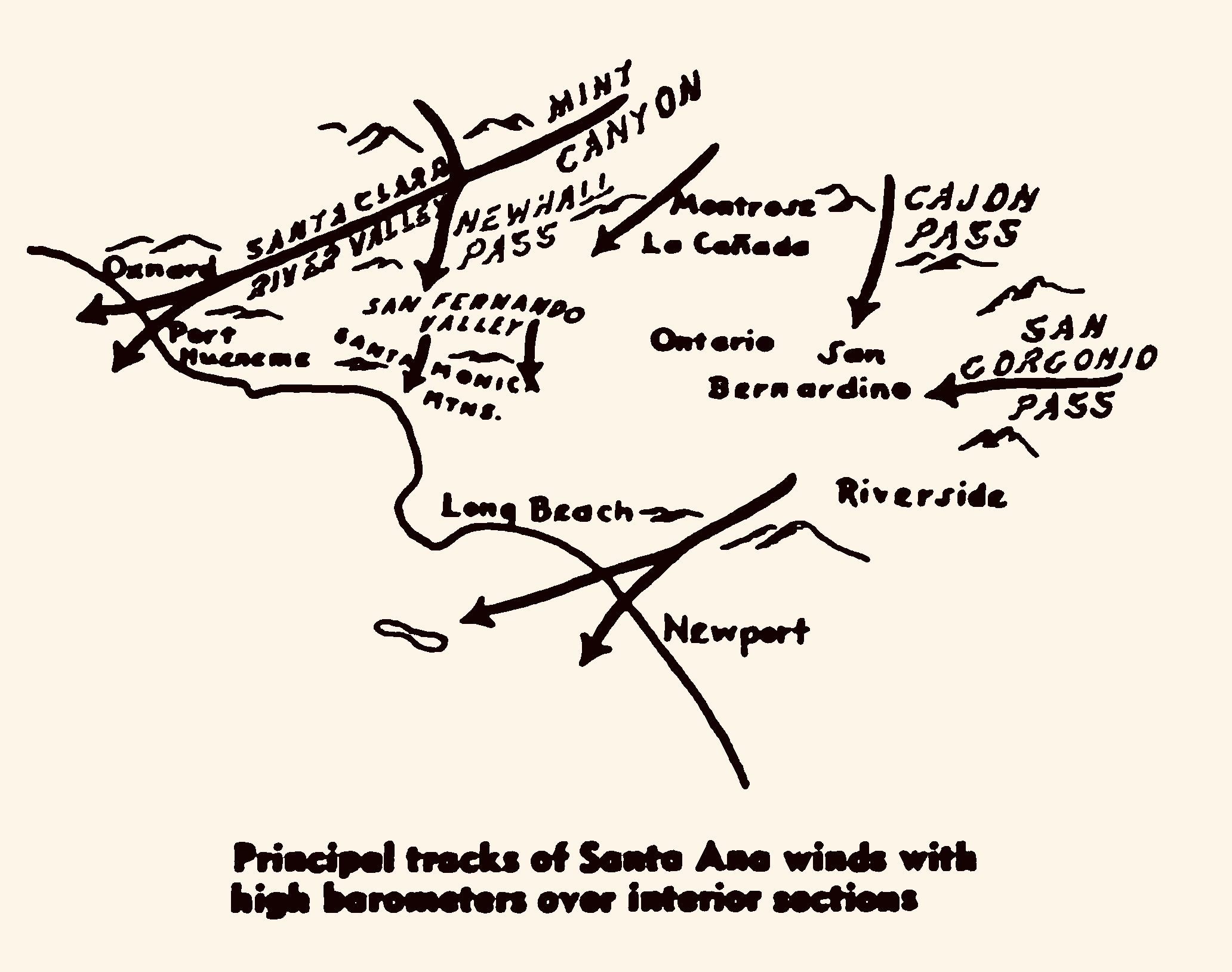
Santa Ana winds speed through Newhall Pass, Cajon Pass, and San Gorgonio Pass (Southland Weather Handbook, 1962)

The name Santa Ana wind became nationally known following a sensationalized 1901 wire story about wind damage. However, because local boosters thought that association of the sometimes destructive winds with the city would be bad for business, they began claiming that calling the "disagreeable" winds the Santa Ana winds was "both incorrect and libelous."

The chamber of commerce thus began a misinformation campaign claiming the name was actually "an Indian word" from somewhere. Supposedly, in their telling, the term Santa Ana wind derived from a Native American phrase for "big wind" or "devil wind" that was then altered by Californios into the form "Satanás" (meaning Satan), and then still later corrupted into "Santa Ana." However, an authority on local Native American languages claims this supposed Indigenous term, "Santana" or "sandana," never existed. No evidence has ever emerged to support this explanation and it is a false etymology.

Another false association is that the name is a reference to General Santa Anna of Mexico and dust clouds kicked up by his cavalry horses. The Santa Ana Journal newspaper, which battled for years to discourage the association between the winds and the town, published a verse with a 1935 news story on wind impacts that nodded to the "devil winds" nomenclature: "The devil sends the naughty winds To blow the skirts on high; But God is just and sends the dust To fill the bad man's eye."

In 1933, Father John O'Connell of Mission San Juan Capistrano reported that Don Jesus Aguilar, born 1855 at Capistrano, said that in his day the winds had been called el viento del norte ("the north wind").

== In popular culture ==
Santa Ana winds are widely believed to affect people's moods and behavior. The Santa Ana winds are commonly portrayed in fiction as being responsible for a tense, uneasy, wrathful mood among Angelenos. The winds blow things over and "make loud noises," which can set people on edge. As The New York Times put it in 2003, "a dry, hot Santa Ana often symbolizes an unnamable menace lying just beneath the sun-shot surface of California life."

According to the Pasadena Public Library book blog, the winds notably appear in Richard Henry Dana's Two Years Before the Mast, the Philip Marlowe story "Red Wind" by Raymond Chandler, three essays by Joan Didion ("Some Dreamers of the Golden Dream" and "Los Angeles Notebook", both included in her 1968 book Slouching Towards Bethlehem, and "Fire Season", included in her 1992 book After Henry), The Husband by Dean Koontz, White Oleander by Janet Fitch, and Less than Zero by Bret Easton Ellis. In Thomas Pynchon's 2009 "California novel" Inherent Vice the winds make an appearance and, per one scholar, "the obligatory noir description of their effects appears on page 98."

Los Angeles Times columnist David L. Ulin commented, "...for writers such as Didion and Chandler, the Santa Ana is an emblem of disruption because, for them, Los Angeles is a disrupted world. We can take issue with that impression of the city; I sometimes do and sometimes don't. But when the Santa Ana starts to blow, I invariably grow edgy...unable, in the most concrete sense, to settle myself down."

There was a desert wind blowing that night. It was one of those hot dry Santa Anas that come down through the mountain passes and curl your hair and make your nerves jump and your skin itch. On nights like that every booze party ends in a fight. Meek little wives feel the edge of the carving knife and study their husbands' necks. Anything can happen. You can even get a full glass of beer at a cocktail lounge.

— Raymond Chandler, "Red Wind" (1938)

The baby frets. The maid sulks. I rekindle a waning argument with the telephone company, then cut my losses and lie down, given over to whatever is in the air. To live with the Santa Ana is to accept, consciously or unconsciously, a deeply mechanistic view of human behavior. ... [T]he violence and the unpredictability of the Santa Ana affect the entire quality of life in Los Angeles, accentuate its impermanence, its unreliability. The wind shows us how close to the edge we are.

— Joan Didion, "Los Angeles Notebook" in Slouching Towards Bethlehem (1968)

When the hills of Los Angeles are burning
Palm trees are candles in the murder winds
So many lives are on the breeze/ Even the stars are ill at ease
And Los Angeles is burning.

— Bad Religion, "Los Angeles Is Burning" (2004)

Some of this experienced mood shift is likely due to the increase of static electricity in dry conditions. California folklore therefore credits the winds with "strange luminosity in the form of sparks and glows that accompany the winds" and an excess of "positive ions, disrupting health, well-being, and temperament."

The Santa Ana winds are the namesake of an antagonist in the English version of the anime JoJo's Bizarre Adventure, they are also a minor plot point in its seventh part, Steel Ball Run.

=== Song references ===
- Ben Lee's single "Catch My Disease"
- The Sloppy Boys' opening track "Santa Ana Winds" on their sophomore album "Dancing on the Wind"
- Steely Dan's song "Babylon Sisters" ("Here come those Santa Ana winds again...Bad news.")
- Belinda Carlisle song "Summer Rain"
- The Beach Boys song "Santa Ana Winds"
- The Bobs' song "Santa Ana Woman"
- Randy Newman song "I Love L.A."
- Eric Church's song "Heart of the Night" on his album Heart
- Old Dominion's song "Make It Sweet"
- Waylon Payne in his song "Santa Ana Winds"
- Survivor's "Santa Ana Winds" is the final track from their 1983 album Caught in the Game
- Bruce Springsteen's song "Western Stars" from his 2019 album Western Stars
- Lagrimas' song "the devil wind" from their 2019 demo
- Modern Original and The Mowgli's song "C O O L Santa Ana" (2022)
- Rancid's song "Brad Logan" from Chef Aid : The South Park Album (1998).
- Michael McDonald's song "Homeboy" from his 1990 album Take It to Heart
- She Wants Revenge's song "Up in Flames" (2011)
- Mew's song "The Zookeeper's Boy" (2006)
- Mark Knopfler's song "Smart Money" from the album One Deep River (2024)
- Emei's song "Scatterbrain" (2023)
- Bad Religion's song "Los Angeles Is Burning" from the album The Empire Strikes First (2004)
- Animal Logic's song "Winds of Santa Ana" from the album Animal Logic (1989)
- Lana Del Rey's song "California" from the album Norman Fucking Rockwell! (2019)
- The Swirling Eddies' song "Hold Back the Wind, Donna, from Outdoor Elvis. (1989)
- Crazy Ex-Girlfriend (TV series) “Santa Ana Winds” song in s2, ep11 (2017)

== See also ==
- Geography of southern California
- Climate of Los Angeles
- Climate of San Diego
- Climate change in California
- El Niño–Southern Oscillation
- Australian foehn winds – Dry wind in southeastern Australia
- Berg wind – Wind in South Africa
- Bora (wind) – Wind in areas near the Adriatic Sea
- Chinook wind – Warm, dry wind in North America
- Diablo wind – Northern California weather pattern
- Khamsin – Local name for a dry, hot wind in Egypt and the Levant
- Norte (wind)
- Nor'west arch – Föhn cloud formation in New Zealand
- Oroshi – Downslope winds of Japan
- Sirocco – Mediterranean wind
- Washoe Zephyr – Seasonal wind in Nevada, US

== Sources ==
- Stephenson, Terry E. (January 1943). "The Santa Ana Wind". California Folklore Quarterly. 2 (1). Western States Folklore Society: 35–45. doi:10.2307/1495654. ISSN 1556-1283. JSTOR 1495654.
