= Free convective layer =

Diagram showing an air parcel path when raised along B-C-E compared to the surrounding air mass Temperature (T) and humidity (Tw)

In atmospheric sciences, the free convective layer (FCL) is the layer of conditional or potential instability in the troposphere. It is a layer in which rising air can experience positive buoyancy (PBE) so that deep, moist convection (DMC) can occur. On an atmospheric sounding, it is the layer between the level of free convection (LFC) and the equilibrium level (EL). The FCL is important to a variety of convective processes and to severe thunderstorm forecasting.

It is the layer of instability, the "positive area" on thermodynamic diagrams where an ascending air parcel is warmer than its environment. Integrating buoyant energy from the LFC to the EL gives the amount of convective available potential energy (CAPE), an estimate of the maximum energy available to convection. The depth of the FCL is expressed by the formula:

FCL = Z_{EL} - Z_{LFC}

or

FCL = P_{EL} - P_{LFC}

Deep, moist convection is essentially a thunderstorm or thundercloud, although some such convection does not produce lightning and thus not thunder. It is cumulus congestus clouds or cumulonimbus clouds. An air parcel ascending from the near surface layer (mixed layer (ML) or boundary layer (PBL)) must work through the stable layer of convective inhibition (CIN) when present. This work comes from sufficiently increasing instability in the low levels by raising the temperature or dew point, or by mechanical lift. Without the aid of mechanical forcing, a parcel must reach its convective temperature (T_{c}) before moist convection (cloud) begins near the convective condensation level (CCL), whereas with dynamic lift, cloud base begins near the lifted condensation level (LCL). When such a capping inversion is present, this will remain as shallow, moist convection (small cumulus clouds) until breaking through the convective inhibition layer, after which DMC ensues as a parcel hits the LFC and enters the FCL, if thermal or mechanical forcing continues (and sufficient moisture is available in the inflow layer). At the level of neutral buoyancy (the EL), a parcel is cooler than the environment and is thermodynamically stable, continuing to rise via momentum and thus it slows down until eventually ceasing ascent at the maximum parcel level (MPL) --which may visually manifest itself as an overshooting top. Ignoring other influences, higher amount of total CAPE in the FCL, and especially greater thickness of this positive area, which can be measured as lifted index (LI) at a respective altitude, results in more vigorous updrafts and faster air parcel ascent.

== See also ==
- Atmospheric thermodynamics
