= Atmospheric instability =

Condition where the Earth's atmosphere is generally considered to be unstable

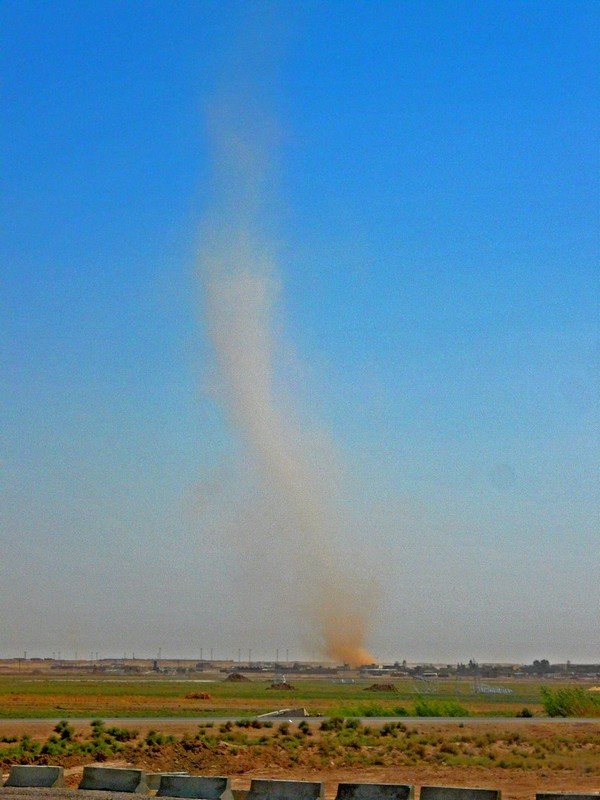
A dust devil in Ramadi, Iraq.

Atmospheric instability is a condition where the Earth's atmosphere is considered to be unstable and as a result local weather is highly variable through distance and time. Atmospheric instability encourages vertical motion, which is directly correlated to different types of weather systems and their severity. For example, under unstable conditions, a lifted parcel of air will find cooler and denser surrounding air, making the parcel prone to further ascent, in a positive feedback loop.

In meteorology, instability can be described by various indices such as the Bulk Richardson Number, lifted index, K-index, convective available potential energy (CAPE), the Showalter, and the Vertical totals. These indices, as well as atmospheric instability itself, involve temperature changes through the troposphere with height, or lapse rate.

Effects of atmospheric instability in moist atmospheres include thunderstorm development, which over warm oceans can lead to tropical cyclogenesis, and turbulence. In dry atmospheres, inferior mirages, dust devils, steam devils, and fire whirls can form. Stable atmospheres can be associated with drizzle, fog, increased air pollution, a lack of turbulence, and undular bore formation.

== Forms ==
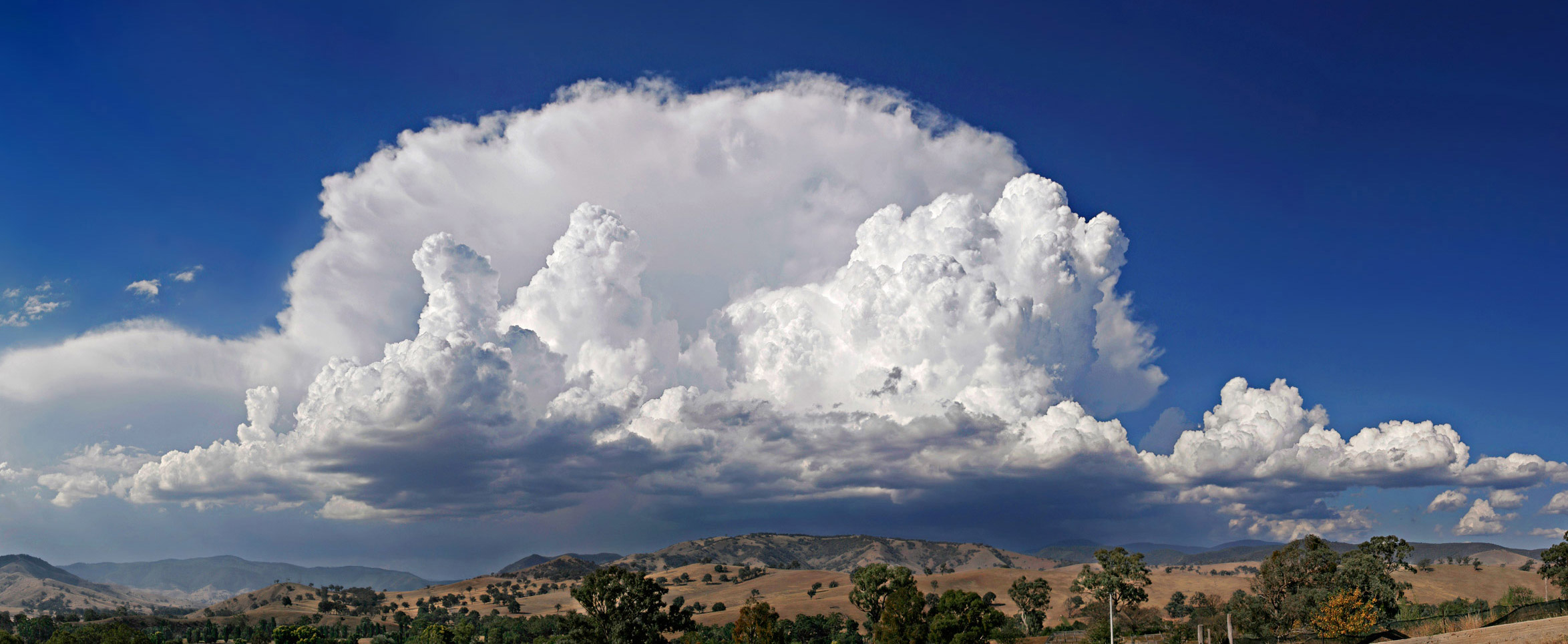
Anvil shaped thundercloud in the mature stage over Swifts Creek, Victoria, Australia

There are two primary forms of atmospheric instability. Under convective instability, thermal mixing through convection in the form of rising warm air leads to the development of clouds and possibly precipitation or convective storms. Dynamic instability is produced through the horizontal movement of air and the physical forces it is subjected to such as the Coriolis force and pressure gradient force; resulting dynamic lifting and mixing produces cloud, precipitation and storms often on a synoptic scale.

== Cause of instability ==
Whether or not the atmosphere has stability depends partially on the moisture content. In a very dry troposphere, an environmental lapse rate (the rate at which the temperature of the environment surrounding an air mass decreases with height) of less than 9.8 °C (17.6 °F) per kilometer ascent indicates stability, while greater changes indicate instability. This lapse rate is known as the dry adiabatic lapse rate. When the environmental lapse rate is less than the adiabatic lapse rate, an air parcel that undergoes adiabatic change of pressure will eventually be colder and thus denser than the surrounding air, causing it to descend to its initial pressure. When the environmental lapse rate is greater than the dry adiabatic lapse rate, air parcels are warmer and less dense than the surrounding air, causing them to continue rising while being accelerated by buoyancy. In a completely moist troposphere, a temperature decrease with height less than 6 °C (11 °F) per kilometer ascent indicates stability, while greater changes indicate instability. In the range between 6 °C (11 °F) and 9.8 °C (17.6 °F) temperature decrease per kilometer ascent, the term conditionally unstable is used, where the atmosphere is stable for dry air parcels, and unstable for moist saturated air parcels.

== Indices used for its determination ==
=== Lifted Index ===
The lifted index (LI), usually expressed in kelvins, is the temperature difference between the temperature of the environment Te(p) and an air parcel lifted adiabatically Tp(p) at a given pressure height in the troposphere, usually 500 hPa (mb). When the value is positive, the atmosphere (at the respective height) is stable and when the value is negative, the atmosphere is unstable. Thunderstorms are expected with values below −2, and severe weather is anticipated with values below −6.

=== K Index ===
| K-index value | Thunderstorm probability |
|---|---|
| Less than 20 | None |
| 20 to 25 | Isolated thunderstorms |
| 26 to 30 | Widely scattered thunderstorms |
| 31 to 35 | Scattered thunderstorms |
| Above 35 | Numerous thunderstorms |

The K index is derived arithmetically: K-index = (850 hPa temperature – 500 hPa temperature) + 850 hPa dew point – 700 hPa dew point depression

- The temperature difference between 850 hPa (5,000 feet (1,500 m) above sea level) and 500 hPa (18,000 feet (5,500 m) above sea level) is used to parameterize the vertical temperature lapse rate.
- The 850 hPa dew point provides information on the moisture content of the lower atmosphere.
- The vertical extent of the moist layer is represented by the difference of the 700 hPa temperature (10,000 feet (3,000 m) above sea level) and 700 hPa dew point.

=== CAPE and CIN ===
Conditions favorable for thunderstorm types and complexes

Convective available potential energy (CAPE), sometimes, simply, available potential energy (APE), is the amount of energy a parcel of air would have if lifted a certain distance vertically through the atmosphere. CAPE is effectively the positive buoyancy of an air parcel and is an indicator of atmospheric instability, which makes it valuable in predicting severe weather. CIN, convective inhibition, is effectively negative buoyancy, expressed B-; the opposite of convective available potential energy (CAPE), which is expressed as B+ or simply B. As with CAPE, CIN is usually expressed in J/kg but may also be expressed as m^{2}/s^{2}, as the values are equivalent. In fact, CIN is sometimes referred to as negative buoyant energy (NBE).

It is a form of fluid instability found in thermally stratified atmospheres in which a colder fluid overlies a warmer one. When an air mass is unstable, the element of the air mass that is displaced upwards is accelerated by the pressure differential between the displaced air and the ambient air at the (higher) altitude to which it was displaced. This usually creates vertically developed clouds from convection, due to the rising motion, which can eventually lead to thunderstorms. It could also be created in other phenomenon, such as a cold front. Even if the air is cooler on the surface, there is still warmer air in the mid-levels, that can rise into the upper-levels. However, if there is not enough water vapor present, there is no ability for condensation, thus storms, clouds, and rain will not form.

=== Bulk Richardson Number ===
The Bulk Richardson Number (BRN) is a dimensionless number relating vertical stability and vertical wind shear (generally, stability divided by shear). It represents the ratio of thermally-produced turbulence and turbulence generated by vertical shear. Practically, its value determines whether convection is free or forced. High values indicate unstable and/or weakly sheared environments; low values indicate weak instability and/or strong vertical shear. Generally, values in the range of around 10 to 45 suggest environmental conditions favorable for supercell development.

=== Showalter index ===
The Showalter index, developed by meteorologist Albert K. Showalter, is a dimensionless number computed by taking the temperature at the 850 hPa level which is then taken dry adiabatically up to saturation, then up to the 500 hPa level, which is then subtracted by the observed 500 hPa level temperature. If the value is negative, then the lower portion of the atmosphere is unstable, with thunderstorms expected when the value is below −3. The application of the Showalter index is especially helpful when there is a cool, shallow air mass below 850 hPa that conceals the potential convective lifting. However, the index will underestimate the potential convective lifting if there are cool layers that extend above 850 hPa and it does not consider diurnal radiative changes or moisture below 850 hPa.

== Effects ==
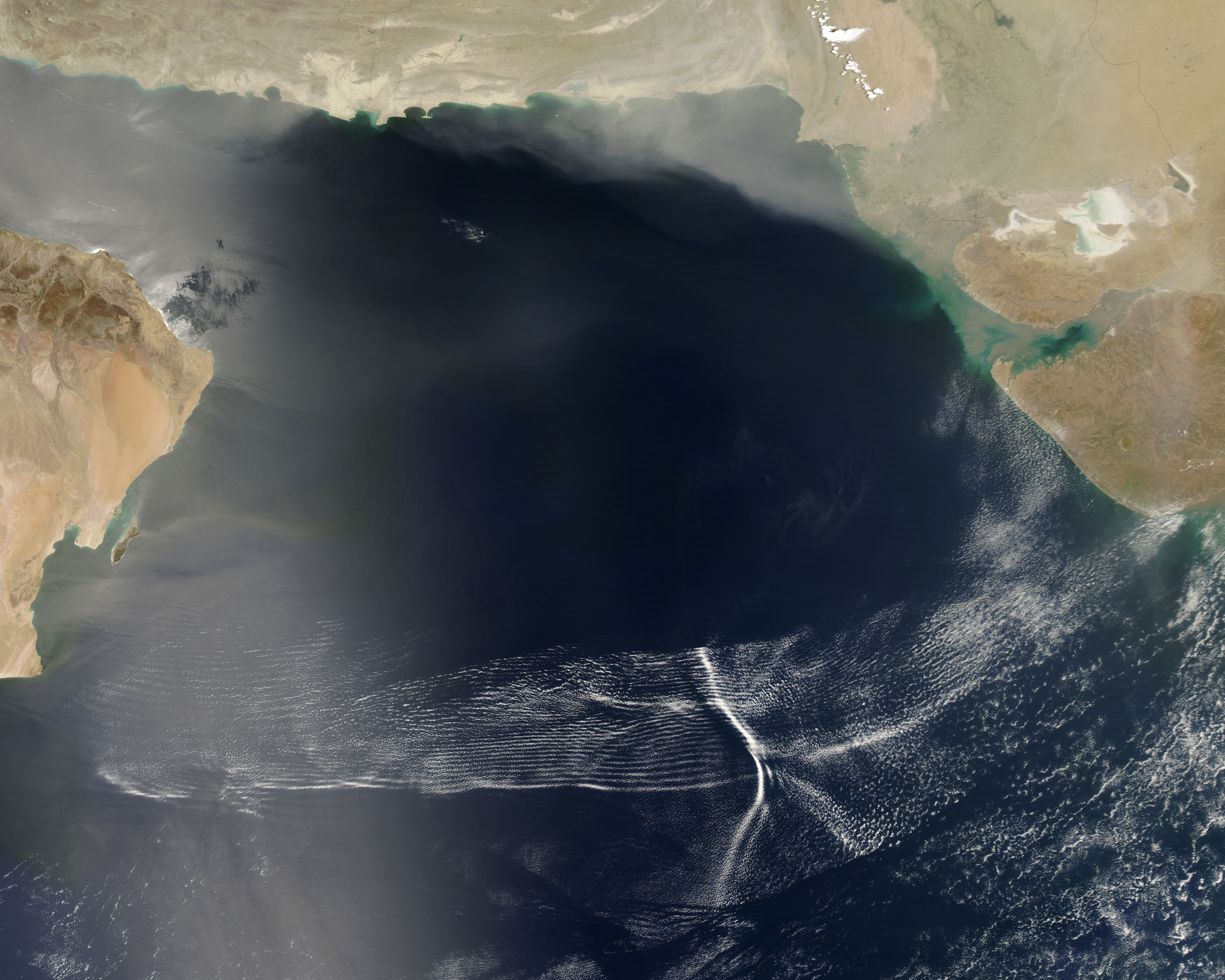
Image of an undular bore wave

=== Stable atmosphere ===
Stable conditions, such as during a clear and calm night, will cause pollutants to become trapped near ground level. Drizzle occurs within a moist air mass when it is stable. Air within a stable layer is not turbulent. Conditions associated with a marine layer, a stable atmosphere common on the west side of continents near cold water currents, leads to overnight and morning fog. Undular bores can form when a low level boundary such as a cold front or outflow boundary approaches a layer of cold, stable air. The approaching boundary will create a disturbance in the atmosphere producing a wave-like motion, known as a gravity wave. Although the undular bore waves appear as bands of clouds across the sky, they are transverse waves, and are propelled by the transfer of energy from an oncoming storm and are shaped by gravity. The ripple-like appearance of this wave is described as the disturbance in the water when a pebble is dropped into a pond or when a moving boat creates waves in the surrounding water. The object displaces the water or medium the wave is travelling through and the medium moves in an upward motion. However, because of gravity, the water or medium is pulled back down and the repetition of this cycle creates the transverse wave motion.

=== Unstable atmosphere ===
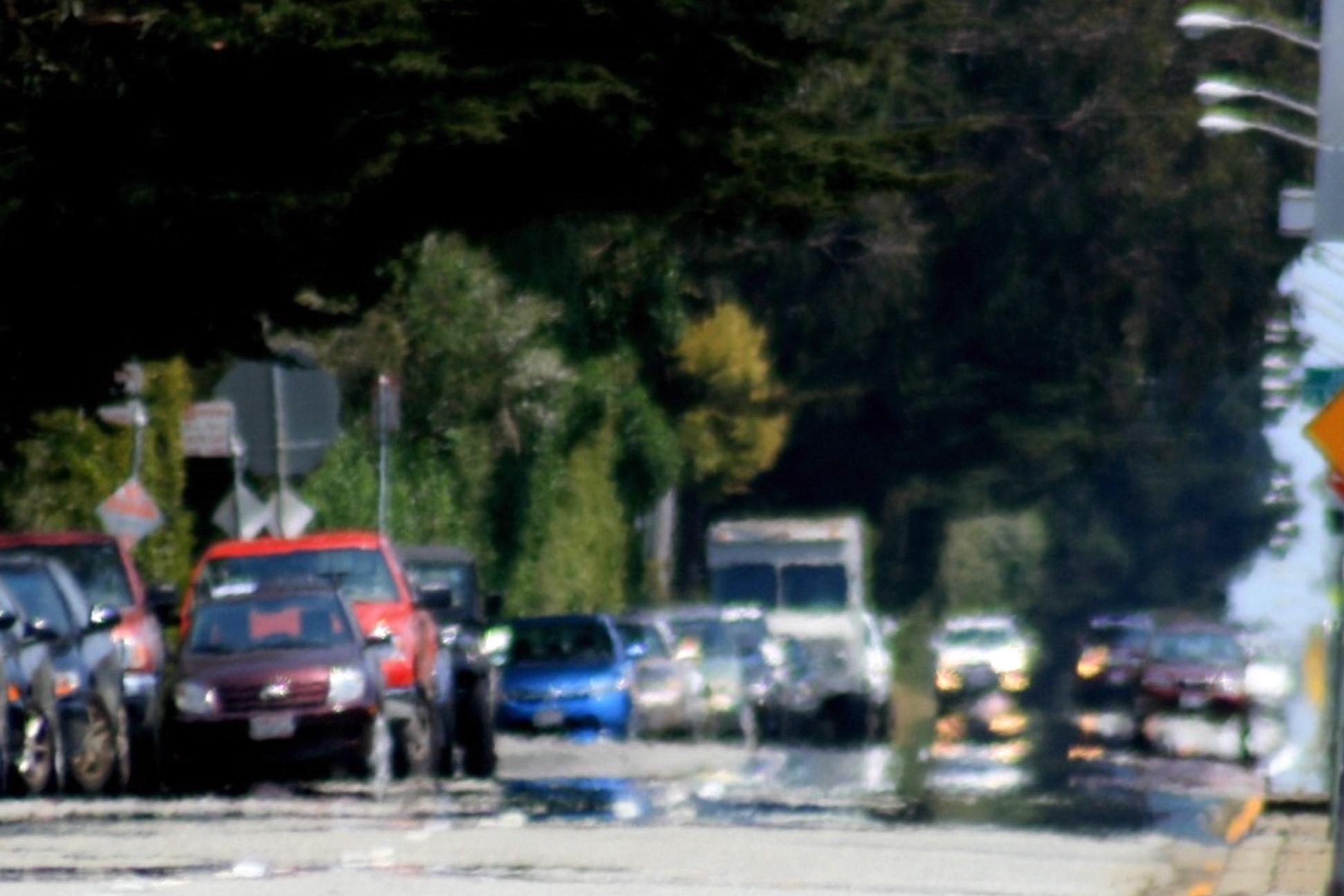
Mirage over a hot road, with the appearance of "fake water" on its surface

Within an unstable layer in the troposphere, the lifting of air parcels will occur, and continue for as long as the nearby atmosphere remains unstable. Once overturning through the depth of the troposphere occurs (with convection being capped by the relatively warmer, more stable layer of the stratosphere), deep convective currents lead to thunderstorm development when enough moisture is present. Over warm ocean waters and within a region of the troposphere with light vertical wind shear and significant low level spin (or vorticity), such thunderstorm activity can grow in coverage and develop into a tropical cyclone. Over hot surfaces during warm days, unstable dry air can lead to significant refraction of the light within the air layer, which causes inferior mirages.

When winds are light, dust devils can develop on dry days within a region of instability at ground level. Small-scale, tornado-like circulations can occur over or near any intense surface heat source, which would have significant instability in its vicinity. Those that occur near intense wildfires are called fire whirls, which can spread a fire beyond its previous bounds. A steam devil is a rotating updraft that involves steam or smoke. They can form from smoke issuing from a power plant smokestack. Hot springs and warm lakes are also suitable locations for a steam devil to form, when cold arctic air passes over the relatively warm water.

== See also ==
- Atmospheric thermodynamics
- Buoyancy
- Stable and unstable stratification
