= Convective overshoot =

Phenomenon of convection

Convective overshoot is a phenomenon of convection carrying material beyond an unstable region of the atmosphere into a stratified, stable region. Overshoot is caused by the momentum of the convecting material, which carries the material beyond the unstable region.

== Deep, moist convection in Earth's atmosphere ==
One example is thermal columns extending above the top of the equilibrium level (EL) in thunderstorms: unstable air rising from (or near) the surface normally stops rising at the EL (near the tropopause) and spreads out as an anvil cloud; but in the event of a strong updraft, unstable air is carried past the EL as an overshooting top or dome. A parcel of air will stop ascending at the maximum parcel level (MPL). This overshoot is responsible for most of the turbulence experienced in the cruise phase of commercial air flights.

== Stellar convection ==
Convective overshoot also occurs at the boundaries of convective zones in stars. An example of this is at the base of the convection zone in the solar interior. The heat of the Sun's thermonuclear fusion is carried outward by radiation in the deep interior radiation zone and by convective circulation in the outer convection zone, but cool sinking material from the surface penetrates further into the radiative zone than theory would suggest. This affects the heat transfer rate and the temperature of the solar interior which can be indirectly measured by helioseismology. The layer between the Sun's convective and radiative zone is called the tachocline.

Overshooting can have more pronounced effects on the evolution of stars that have a convective core, such as intermediate- and high-mass stars. Convective material that overshoots beyond the core mixes with the surrounding material, causing some of the surrounding material to mix into the core. As a result, the core mass at the end of the main sequence can be larger than would otherwise be expected. This leads to big differences in behaviour on the subgiant and giant branches for intermediate mass stars, and to radical changes in the evolution of massive supergiant stars.
