= Lifted index =

Temperature difference measure of the stability of the atmosphere

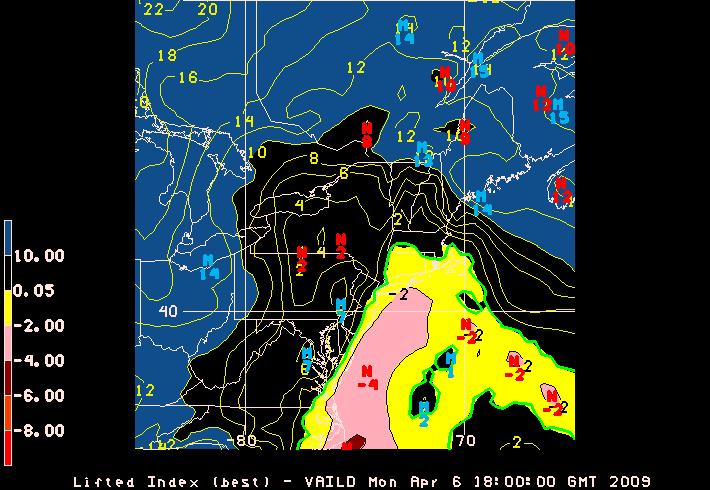
Computer generated Lifted Index field from April 6th, 2009, at 1 pm EDT. Unstable areas are in yellow (slightly) and red (highly) while the stable zone is in blue.

The lifted index (LI) is the temperature difference between the environment Te(p) and an air parcel lifted adiabatically Tp(p) at a given pressure height in the troposphere (lowest layer where most weather occurs) of the atmosphere, usually 500 hPa (mb). The temperature is measured in Celsius. When the value is positive, the atmosphere (at the respective height) is stable and when the value is negative, the atmosphere is unstable.

== Determining LI ==
LI can be computed using computer algorithms but can also be determined graphically. To do this, generally, the parcel is lifted from the portion of the planetary boundary layer (PBL) that lies below the morning inversion. The air here should be about 60 to 65% RH, which is then lifted along the dry adiabat (see also adiabatic process) to the lifting condensation level (LCL), which is the intersection of that curve with the average mixing ratio in the boundary layer. Once the LCL is found, the parcel is lifted along the moist adiabat to 500 mb. It is then that one finds LI = Te(p) - Tp(p).

LI is generally scaled as follows:

- LI 6 or Greater, Very Stable Conditions
- LI Between 1 and 6 : Stable Conditions, Thunderstorms Not Likely
- LI Between 0 and -2 : Slightly Unstable, Thunderstorms Possible, With Lifting Mechanism (i.e., cold front, daytime heating, ...)
- LI Between -2 and -6 : Unstable, Thunderstorms Likely, Some Severe With Lifting Mechanism
- LI Less Than -6: Very Unstable, Severe Thunderstorms Likely With Lifting Mechanism

== Significance to thunderstorms ==
The lifted index can be used in thunderstorm forecasting, however, convective available potential energy (CAPE) is considered by most as a superior measurement of instability and is preferred by many meteorologists for convection forecasting. However, LI is easier and faster to determine without using a computer, as determining CAPE requires integration from one level to another.

== See also ==
- Atmospheric convection
- Atmospheric thermodynamics
- Convective instability
- Lapse rate
