= Convective condensation level =

Atmospheric altitude at which condensation occurs

The convective condensation level (CCL) represents the height (or pressure) where an air parcel becomes saturated when heated from below and lifted adiabatically due to buoyancy.

In the atmosphere, assuming a constant water vapor mixing ratio, the dew point temperature (the temperature where the relative humidity is 100%) decreases with increasing height because the pressure of the atmosphere decreases with height. The CCL is determined by plotting the dew point (100%RH) versus altitude and locating the intersection with the actual measured temperature sounding. It marks where the cloud base begins when air is heated from below to the convective temperature, without mechanical lift.

Once the CCL is determined, the surface temperature necessary to raise a mass of air to that height can be found by using the Dry Adiabatic Lapse Rate (DALR) to determine the potential temperature. In the early morning, this temperature is typically larger than the surface temperature, in the mid-afternoon, it may be the same.

Compare this to the Lifting Condensation Level (LCL) where the air is lifted and cooled without first increasing the surface temperature. The LCL is less than or equal to the CCL depending on the temperature profile.

Both condensation levels indicate the altitude (or pressure) where relative humidity reaches 100%. However, since the actual condensation level depends on the availability of condensation nuclei, clouds typically do not form until the relative humidity is somewhat above 100%.

== See also ==
- Atmospheric convection
- Atmospheric thermodynamics
- Lifting condensation level and level of free convection
