= Maximum parcel level =

The maximum parcel level (MPL) is the highest level in the atmosphere that a moist convectively rising air parcel will reach after ascending from the level of free convection (LFC) through the free convective layer (FCL) and reaching the equilibrium level (EL), near the tropopause. As the parcel rises through the FCL it expands adiabatically causing its temperature to drop, often below the temperature of its surroundings, and eventually lose buoyancy. Because of this, the EL is approximately the region where the distinct flat tops (called anvil clouds), often observed around the upper portions of cumulonimbus clouds. If the air parcel ascended quickly enough then it retains momentum after it has cooled and continues rising past the EL, ceasing at the MPL (visually represented by the overshooting top, above the anvil).

Dynamic processes within and between convective cells, such as updraft merging and cloud base areal size, factor into the actual ultimate cloud top height, in addition to atmospheric thermodynamics of the MPL. Updraft merging can lead to higher cloud tops, thus an implication is that organized convection can be taller convection.

== See also ==
- Atmospheric convection
- Skew-T log-P diagram
