= Capping inversion =

Elevated inversion layer that caps the part of the atmosphere closest to the ground

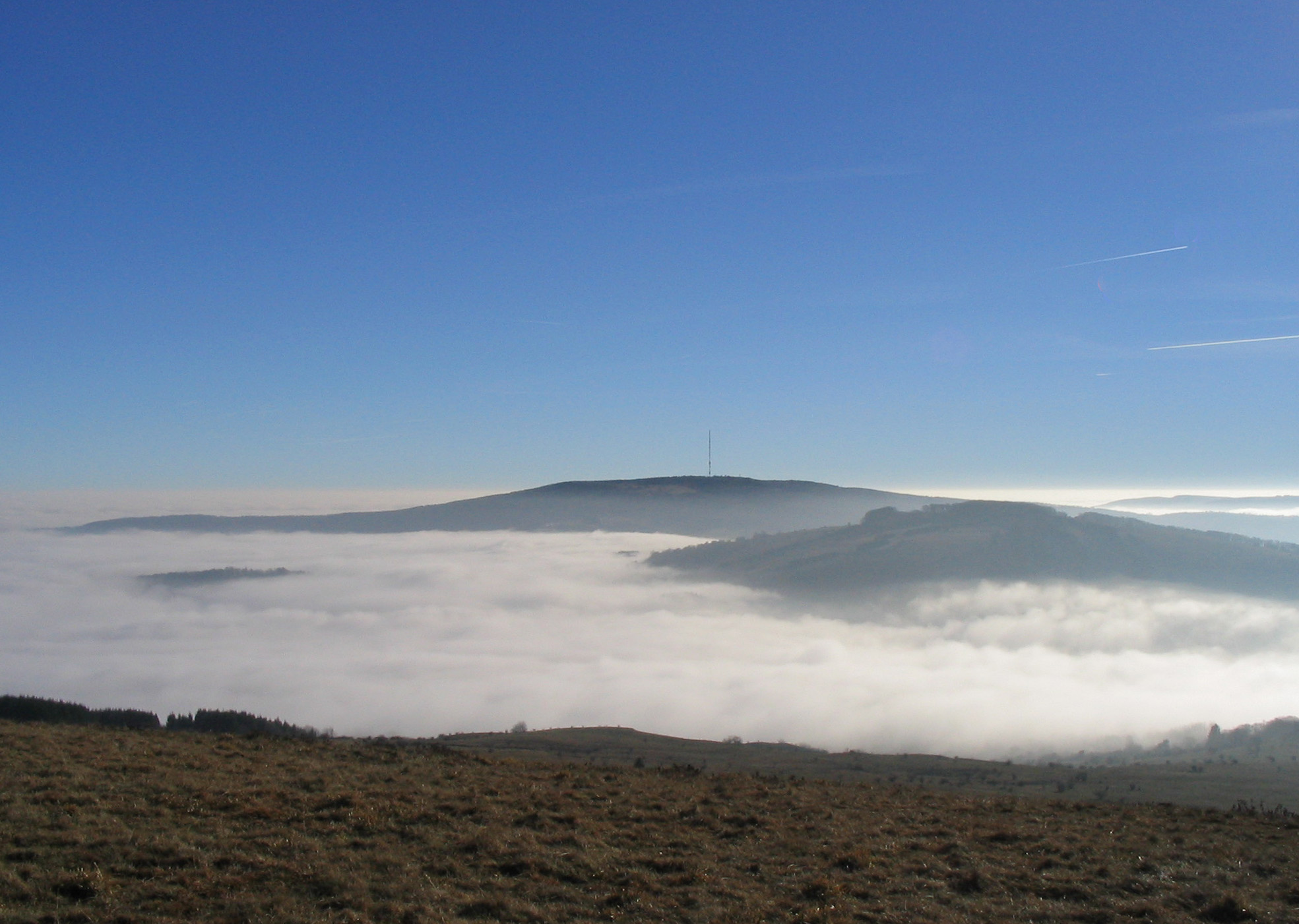
A capping inversion limits the vertical development of clouds. In this image taken near Kreuzberg (Rhön), the inversion is below the top of the mountain tops.

Diagram showing the daily changes to the capping inversion on top of Earth's planetary boundary layer.

A capping inversion is an elevated inversion layer that caps a convective planetary boundary layer.

== Occurrence ==
The boundary layer is the part of the atmosphere which is closest to the ground. Normally, the sun heats the ground, which in turn heats the air just above it. Thermals form when this warm air rises into the cold air (warm air is less dense than cold air), a process called convection. A convective layer such as this has the potential for cloud formation, since condensation occurs as the warm air rises and cools. An inversion occurs when the normal temperature (warm air below, cold air above) profile is reversed, creating a stable configuration of dense, cold air sitting below lighter, warm air. An elevated inversion layer is thus a region of warm air above a region of cold air, but higher in the atmosphere (generally not touching the surface).

A capping inversion occurs when there is a boundary layer with a normal temperature profile (warm air rising into cooler air) and the layer above that is an inversion layer (cooler air below warm air). Inversions can develop under high pressure areas. Downward motion within these systems can cause warming aloft, producing a capping inversion.

== Effects on clouds and air quality ==
Cloud formation from the lower layer is "capped" by the inversion layer. Air stagnation may result from a capping inversion from diffusing from a region, increasing the concentration of pollutants and exacerbating poor air quality. If the capping inversion layer or "cap" is too strong it will prevent thunderstorms from developing. A strong cap can result in foggy conditions.

However, if the air at the surface is unstable enough, strong updrafts can be forced through the capping inversion. This selective process of only allowing the strongest updrafts to form thunderstorms often results in outbreaks of severe weather. The role of capping inversions in bolstering the intensity of severe weather was realized in conceptual models that were developed by atmospheric science researchers in the late 1960s and had been recognized as a characteristic of tornado-producing airmasses as early as 1954.

== Role in severe weather ==
In some severe weather events, this capping inversion can emerge when a warm and dry mixed layer originating over a high plateau moves over a cooler and moister airmass, forming an "elevated mixed layer" (EML). EMLs can be identified in radiosonde soundings by their steep temperature lapse rates and an increase in relative humidity from the bottom to the top of the layer. They can be found worldwide downwind of high terrain, such as over South Asia, eastern Australia, east of the Rocky Mountains in the central U.S. and northern Mexico, and east of the foothills of the Andes. The Spanish plume weather pattern over western and central Europe, commonly associated with strong thunderstorm events, is also associated with an EML.

== See also ==
- Convective available potential energy
- Convective inhibition
