= Lapse rate =

Vertical rate of change of temperature in atmosphere

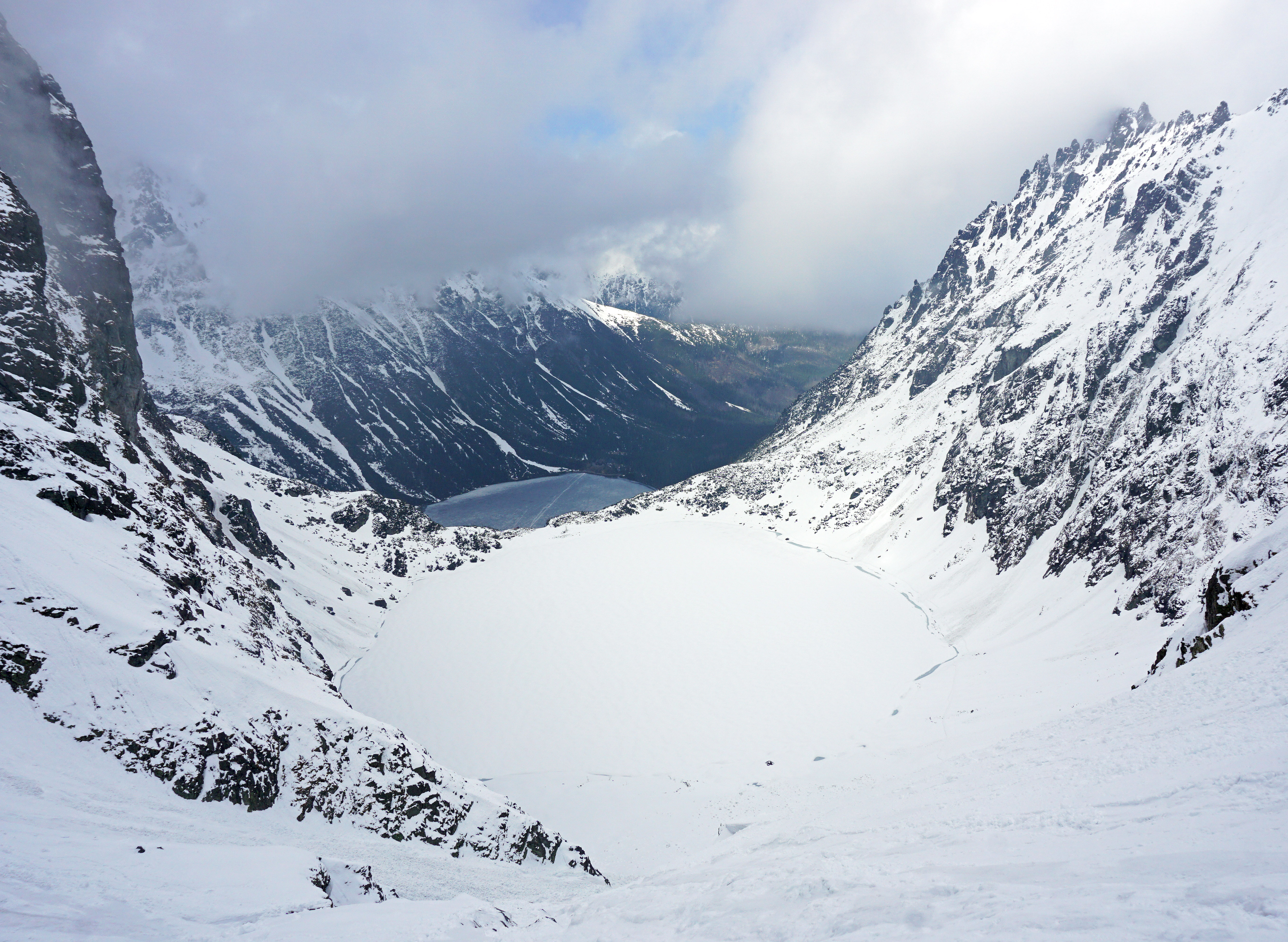
The higher lake, Czarny Staw pod Rysami (elevation 1,583 metres (5,194 ft)), is still frozen while the lower lake, Morskie Oko (elevation 1,395 metres (4,577 ft)) has almost entirely melted already. Photo from Polish side of the Tatra Mountains, May 2019.

The lapse rate is the rate at which an atmospheric variable, normally temperature in Earth's atmosphere, falls with altitude. Lapse rate arises from the word lapse (in its "becoming less" sense, not its "interruption" sense). In dry air, the adiabatic lapse rate (i.e., decrease in temperature of a parcel of air that rises in the atmosphere without exchanging energy with surrounding air) is 9.8 °C/km (5.4 °F per 1,000 ft). The saturated adiabatic lapse rate (SALR), or moist adiabatic lapse rate (MALR), is the decrease in temperature of a parcel of water-saturated air that rises in the atmosphere. It varies with the temperature and pressure of the parcel and is often in the range 3.6 to 9.2 °C/km (2 to 5 °F/1000 ft), as obtained from the International Civil Aviation Organization (ICAO). The environmental lapse rate is the decrease in temperature of air with altitude for a specific time and place (see below). It can be highly variable between circumstances.

Lapse rate corresponds to the vertical component of the spatial gradient of temperature. Although this concept is most often applied to the Earth's troposphere, it can be extended to any gravitationally supported parcel of gas.

== Environmental lapse rate ==
A formal definition from the Glossary of Meteorology is:

The decrease of an atmospheric variable with height, the variable being temperature unless otherwise specified.

Typically, the lapse rate is the negative of the rate of temperature change with altitude change:

$$\Gamma = -\frac{\mathrm{d}T}{\mathrm{d}z}$$

where $\Gamma$ (sometimes $L$) is the lapse rate given in units of temperature divided by units of altitude, T is temperature, and z is altitude. (Note: Note: $\Gamma$ and $\gamma$ are both used in this article but with very distinct meanings.)

The environmental lapse rate (ELR), is the actual rate of decrease of temperature with altitude in the atmosphere at a given time and location.

As an average, the International Civil Aviation Organization (ICAO) defines an international standard atmosphere (ISA) with a temperature lapse rate of 6.50 °C/km (3.56 °F or 1.98 °C/1,000 ft) from sea level to 11 km (36,090 ft or 6.8 mi). From 11 km up to 20 km (65,620 ft or 12.4 mi), the constant temperature is −56.5 °C (−69.7 °F), which is the lowest assumed temperature in the ISA. The standard atmosphere contains no moisture.

Unlike the idealized ISA, the temperature of the actual atmosphere does not always fall at a uniform rate with height. For example, there can be an inversion layer in which the temperature increases with altitude.

== Cause ==
The temperature profile of the atmosphere is a result of the interaction between radiative heating from sunlight, cooling to space via thermal radiation, and upward heat transport via natural convection (which carries hot air and latent heat upward). Above the tropopause, convection does not occur and all cooling is radiative.

Within the troposphere, the lapse rate is essentially the consequence of a balance between (a) radiative cooling of the air, which by itself would lead to a high lapse rate; and (b) convection, which is activated when the lapse rate exceeds a critical value; convection stabilizes the environmental lapse rate.

Sunlight hits the surface of the earth (land and sea) and heats them. The warm surface heats the air above it. In addition, nearly a third of absorbed sunlight is absorbed within the atmosphere, heating the atmosphere directly.

Thermal conduction helps transfer heat from the surface to the air; this conduction occurs within the few millimeters of air closest to the surface. However, above that thin interface layer, thermal conduction plays a negligible role in transferring heat within the atmosphere; this is because the thermal conductivity of air is very low.

The air is radiatively cooled by greenhouse gases (water vapor, carbon dioxide, etc.) and clouds emitting longwave thermal radiation to space.

If radiation were the only way to transfer energy within the atmosphere, then the lapse rate near the surface would be roughly 40 °C/km and the greenhouse effect of gases in the atmosphere would keep the ground at roughly 333 K (60 °C; 140 °F).

However, when air gets hot or humid, its density decreases. Thus, air which has been heated by the surface tends to rise and carry internal energy upward, especially if the air has been moistened by evaporation from water surfaces. This is the process of convection. Vertical convective motion stops when a parcel of air at a given altitude has the same density as the other air at the same elevation.

Convection carries hot, moist air upward and cold, dry air downward, with a net effect of transferring heat upward. This makes the air below cooler than it would otherwise be and the air above warmer. Because convection is available to transfer heat within the atmosphere, the lapse rate in the troposphere is reduced to around 6.5 °C/km and the greenhouse effect is reduced to a point where Earth has its observed surface temperature of around 288 K (15 °C; 59 °F).

== Convection and adiabatic expansion ==
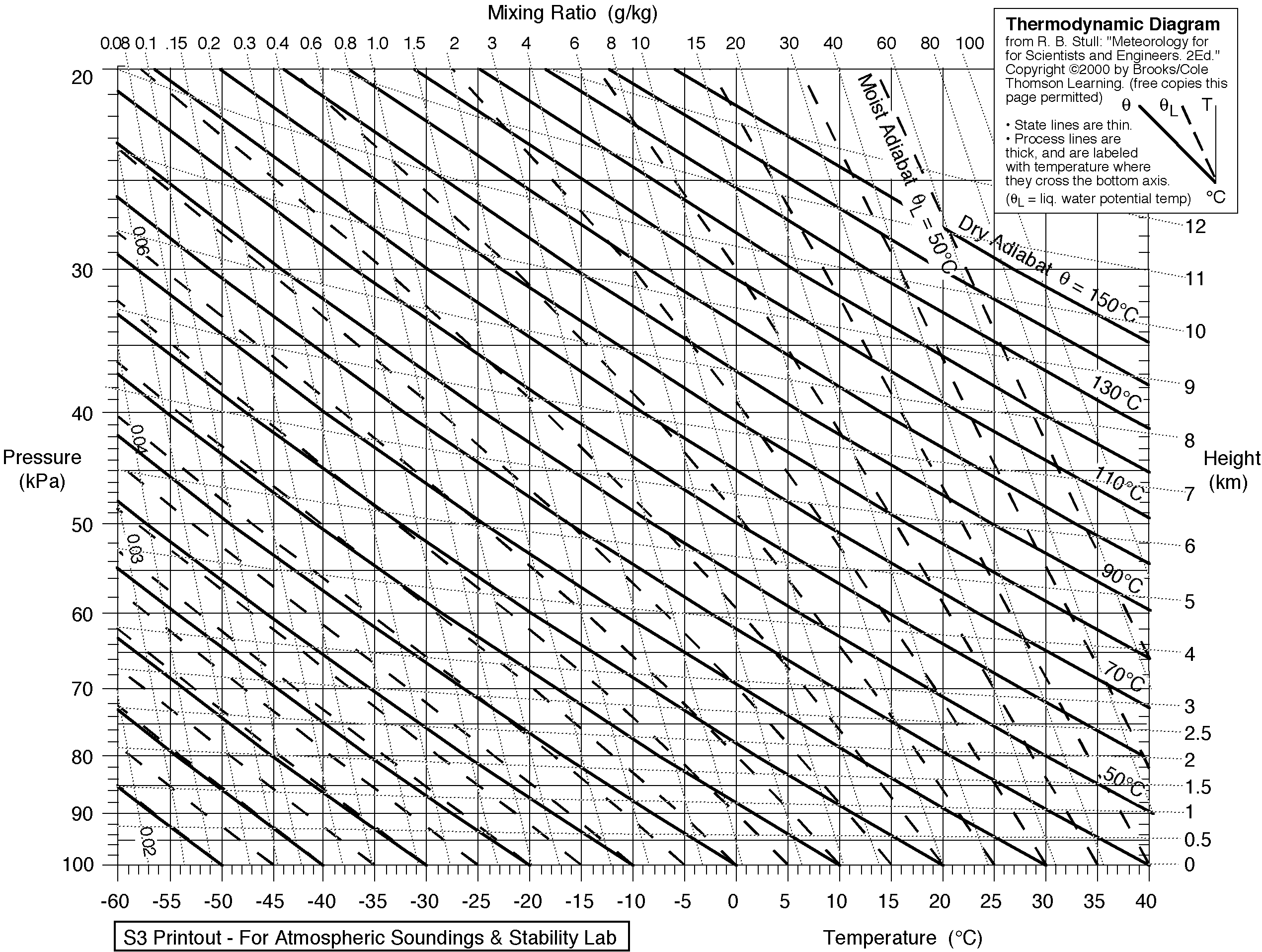
Emagram diagram showing variation of dry adiabats (bold lines) and moist adiabats (dash lines) according to pressure and temperature

As convection causes parcels of air to rise or fall, there is little heat transfer between those parcels and the surrounding air. Air has low thermal conductivity, and the bodies of air involved are very large; so transfer of heat by conduction is negligibly small. Also, intra-atmospheric radiative heat transfer is relatively slow and so is negligible for moving air. Thus, when air ascends or descends, there is little exchange of heat with the surrounding air. A process in which no heat is exchanged with the environment is referred to as an adiabatic process.

Air expands as it moves upward, and contracts as it moves downward. The expansion of rising air parcels, and the contraction of descending air parcels, are adiabatic processes, to a good approximation. When a parcel of air expands, it pushes on the air around it, doing thermodynamic work. Since the upward-moving and expanding parcel does work but gains no heat, it loses internal energy so that its temperature decreases. Downward-moving and contracting air has work done on it, so it gains internal energy and its temperature increases.

Adiabatic processes for air have a characteristic temperature-pressure curve. As air circulates vertically, the air takes on that characteristic gradient, called the adiabatic lapse rate. When the air contains little water, this lapse rate is known as the dry adiabatic lapse rate: the rate of temperature decrease is 9.8 °C/km (5.4 °F per 1,000 ft) (3.0 °C/1,000 ft). The reverse occurs for a sinking parcel of air.

When the environmental lapse rate is less than the adiabatic lapse rate the atmosphere is stable and convection will not occur. The environmental lapse is forced towards the adiabatic lapse rate whenever air is convecting vertically.

Only the troposphere (up to approximately 12 kilometres (39,000 ft) of altitude) in the Earth's atmosphere undergoes convection: the stratosphere does not generally convect. However, some exceptionally energetic convection processes, such as volcanic eruption columns and overshooting tops associated with severe supercell thunderstorms, may locally and temporarily inject convection through the tropopause and into the stratosphere.

Energy transport in the atmosphere is more complex than the interaction between radiation and dry convection. The water cycle (including evaporation, condensation, precipitation) transports latent heat and affects atmospheric humidity levels, significantly influencing the temperature profile, as described below.

== Mathematics of the adiabatic lapse rate ==
Simplified graph of atmospheric lapse rate near sea level

The following calculations derive the temperature as a function of altitude for a packet of air which is ascending or descending without exchanging heat with its environment.

=== Dry adiabatic lapse rate ===
Thermodynamics defines an adiabatic process as:

$$P\, \mathrm{d}V = -\frac{V\, \mathrm{d}P}{\gamma}$$

the first law of thermodynamics can be written as

$$m c_\text{v}\, \mathrm{d}T - \frac{V \,\mathrm{d}P}{\gamma} = 0$$

Also, since the density $\rho = m/V$ and $\gamma = c_\text{p}/c_\text{v}$, we can show that:

$$\rho c_\text{p} \,\mathrm{d}T - \mathrm{d}P = 0$$

where $c_\text{p}$ is the specific heat at constant pressure.

Assuming an atmosphere in hydrostatic equilibrium:

$$\mathrm{d}P = -\rho g\, \mathrm{d}z$$

where g is the standard gravity. Combining these two equations to eliminate the pressure, one arrives at the result for the dry adiabatic lapse rate (DALR),

$$\Gamma_\text{d} = -\frac{\mathrm{d}T}{\mathrm{d}z} = \frac{g}{c_\text{p}} = 9.8\ ^{\circ}\text{C}/\text{km}$$

The DALR ($\Gamma_\text{d}$) is the temperature gradient experienced in an ascending or descending packet of air that is not saturated with water vapor, i.e., with less than 100% relative humidity.

=== Moist adiabatic lapse rate ===
The presence of water within the atmosphere (usually the troposphere) complicates the process of convection. Water vapor contains latent heat of vaporization. As a parcel of air rises and cools, it eventually becomes saturated; that is, the vapor pressure of water in equilibrium with liquid water has decreased (as temperature has decreased) to the point where it is equal to the actual vapor pressure of water. With further decrease in temperature the water vapor in excess of the equilibrium amount condenses, forming cloud, and releasing heat (latent heat of condensation). Before saturation, the rising air follows the dry adiabatic lapse rate. After saturation, the rising air follows the moist (or wet) adiabatic lapse rate. The release of latent heat is an important source of energy in the development of thunderstorms.

While the dry adiabatic lapse rate is a constant 9.8 °C/km (5.4 °F per 1,000 ft, 3 °C/1,000 ft), the moist adiabatic lapse rate varies strongly with temperature. A typical value is around 5 °C/km, (9 °F/km, 2.7 °F/1,000 ft, 1.5 °C/1,000 ft). The formula for the saturated adiabatic lapse rate (SALR) or moist adiabatic lapse rate (MALR) is given by:

$$\Gamma_\text{w}
= g\, \frac{\left(1 + \dfrac{H_\text{v}\, r}{R_\text{sd}\, T}\right)}{\left(c_\text{pd} + \dfrac{H_\text{v}^2\, r}{R_\text{sw}\, T^2}\right)}$$

where:

$\Gamma_\text{w}$,	wet adiabatic lapse rate, K/m
$g$,	Earth's gravitational acceleration = 9.8067 m/s^{2}
$H_v$,	heat of vaporization of water = 2501000 J/kg
$R_\text{sd}$,	specific gas constant of dry air = 287 J/kg·K
$R_\text{sw}$,	specific gas constant of water vapour = 461.5 J/kg·K
$\epsilon = \frac{R_\text{sd}}{R_\text{sw}}$,	the dimensionless ratio of the specific gas constant of dry air to the specific gas constant for water vapour = 0.622
$e$,	the water vapour pressure of the saturated air
$r = \frac{\epsilon e}{p - e}$,	the mixing ratio of the mass of water vapour to the mass of dry air
$p$,	the pressure of the saturated air
$T$,	temperature of the saturated air, K
$c_\text{pd}$,	the specific heat of dry air at constant pressure, = 1003.5 J/kg·K

The SALR or MALR ($\Gamma_\text{w}$) is the temperature gradient experienced in an ascending or descending packet of air that is saturated with water vapor, i.e., with 100% relative humidity.

== Effect on weather ==
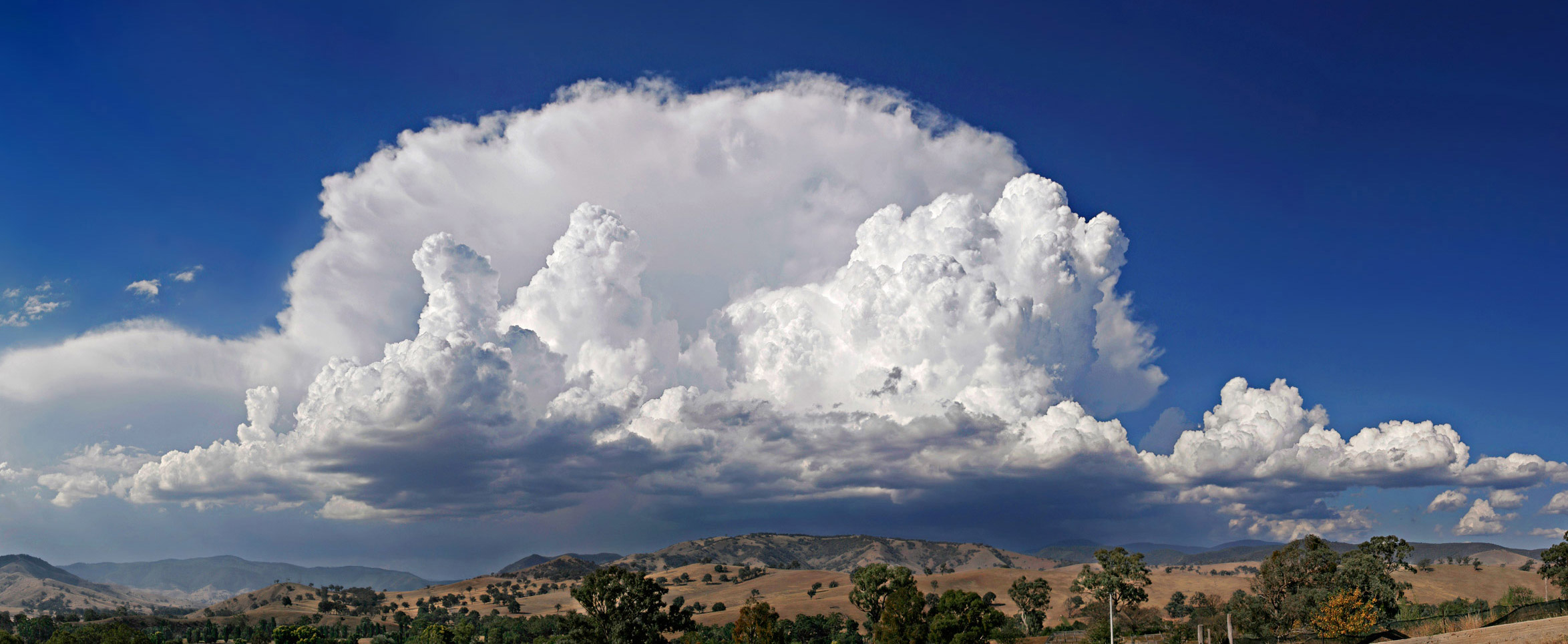
The latent heat of vaporization adds energy to clouds and storms.

The varying environmental lapse rates throughout the Earth's atmosphere are of critical importance in meteorology, particularly within the troposphere. They are used to determine if the parcel of rising air will rise high enough for its water to condense to form clouds, and, having formed clouds, whether the air will continue to rise and form bigger shower clouds, and whether these clouds will get even bigger and form cumulonimbus clouds (thunder clouds).

As unsaturated air rises, its temperature drops at the dry adiabatic rate. The dew point also drops (as a result of decreasing air pressure) but much more slowly, typically about 2 °C per 1,000 m. If unsaturated air rises far enough, eventually its temperature will reach its dew point, and condensation will begin to form. This altitude is known as the lifting condensation level (LCL) when mechanical lift is present and the convective condensation level (CCL) when mechanical lift is absent, in which case, the parcel must be heated from below to its convective temperature. The cloud base will be somewhere within the layer bounded by these parameters.

The difference between the dry adiabatic lapse rate and the rate at which the dew point drops is around 8 °C per 1,000 m. Given a difference in temperature and dew point readings on the ground, one can easily find the LCL by multiplying the difference by 125 m/°C.

If the environmental lapse rate is less than the moist adiabatic lapse rate, the air is absolutely stable — rising air will cool faster than the surrounding air and lose buoyancy. This often happens in the early morning, when the air near the ground has cooled overnight. Cloud formation in stable air is unlikely.

If the environmental lapse rate is between the moist and dry adiabatic lapse rates, the air is conditionally unstable — an unsaturated parcel of air does not have sufficient buoyancy to rise to the LCL or CCL, and it is stable to weak vertical displacements in either direction. If the parcel is saturated it is unstable and will rise to the LCL or CCL, and either be halted due to an inversion layer of convective inhibition, or if lifting continues, deep, moist convection (DMC) may ensue, as a parcel rises to the level of free convection (LFC), after which it enters the free convective layer (FCL) and usually rises to the equilibrium level (EL).

If the environmental lapse rate is larger than the dry adiabatic lapse rate, it has a superadiabatic lapse rate, the air is absolutely unstable — a parcel of air will gain buoyancy as it rises both below and above the lifting condensation level or convective condensation level. This often happens in the afternoon mainly over land masses. In these conditions, the likelihood of cumulus clouds, showers or even thunderstorms is increased.

Meteorologists use radiosondes to measure the environmental lapse rate and compare it to the predicted adiabatic lapse rate to forecast the likelihood that air will rise. Charts of the environmental lapse rate are known as thermodynamic diagrams, examples of which include Skew-T log-P diagrams and tephigrams. (See also Thermals).

The difference in moist adiabatic lapse rate and the dry rate is the cause of foehn wind phenomenon (also known as "Chinook winds" in parts of North America). The phenomenon exists because warm moist air rises through orographic lifting up and over the top of a mountain range or large mountain. The temperature decreases with the dry adiabatic lapse rate, until it hits the dew point, where water vapor in the air begins to condense. Above that altitude, the adiabatic lapse rate decreases to the moist adiabatic lapse rate as the air continues to rise. Condensation is also commonly followed by precipitation on the top and windward sides of the mountain. As the air descends on the leeward side, it is warmed by adiabatic compression at the dry adiabatic lapse rate. Thus, the foehn wind at a certain altitude is warmer than the corresponding altitude on the windward side of the mountain range. In addition, because the air has lost much of its original water vapor content, the descending air creates an arid region on the leeward side of the mountain.

== Impact on the greenhouse effect ==
If the environmental lapse rate was zero, so that the atmosphere was the same temperature at all elevations, then there would be no greenhouse effect. This doesn't mean the lapse rate and the greenhouse effect are the same thing, just that the lapse rate is a prerequisite for the greenhouse effect.

The presence of greenhouse gases on a planet causes radiative cooling of the air, which leads to the formation of a non-zero lapse rate. So, the presence of greenhouse gases leads to there being a greenhouse effect at a global level. However, this need not be the case at a localized level.

The localized greenhouse effect is stronger in locations where the lapse rate is stronger. In Antarctica, thermal inversions in the atmosphere (so that air at higher altitudes is warmer) sometimes cause the localized greenhouse effect to become negative (signifying enhanced radiative cooling to space instead of inhibited radiative cooling as is the case for a positive greenhouse effect).

== Lapse rate in an isolated column of gas ==
A question has sometimes arisen as to whether a temperature gradient will arise in a column of still air in a gravitational field without external energy flows. This issue was addressed by James Clerk Maxwell, who established in 1868 that if any temperature gradient forms, then that temperature gradient must be universal (i.e., the gradient must be same for all materials) or the second law of thermodynamics would be violated. Maxwell also concluded that the universal result must be one in which the temperature is uniform, i.e., the lapse rate is zero.

Santiago and Visser (2019) confirm the correctness of Maxwell's conclusion (zero lapse rate) provided relativistic effects are neglected. When relativity is taken into account, gravity gives rise to an extremely small lapse rate, the Tolman gradient (derived by R. C. Tolman in 1930). At Earth's surface, the Tolman gradient would be about $\Gamma_t = T_s \times (10^{-16}$m$^{-1})$, where $T_s$ is the temperature of the gas at the elevation of Earth's surface. Santiago and Visser remark that "gravity is the only force capable of creating temperature gradients in thermal equilibrium states without violating the laws of thermodynamics" and "the existence of Tolman's temperature gradient is not at all controversial (at least not within the general relativity community)."

== See also ==
- Adiabatic process
- Atmospheric thermodynamics
- Fluid dynamics
- Foehn wind
- Lapse rate climate feedback
- Scale height
