= Overshooting top =

Part of the convective tower of a thunderstorm

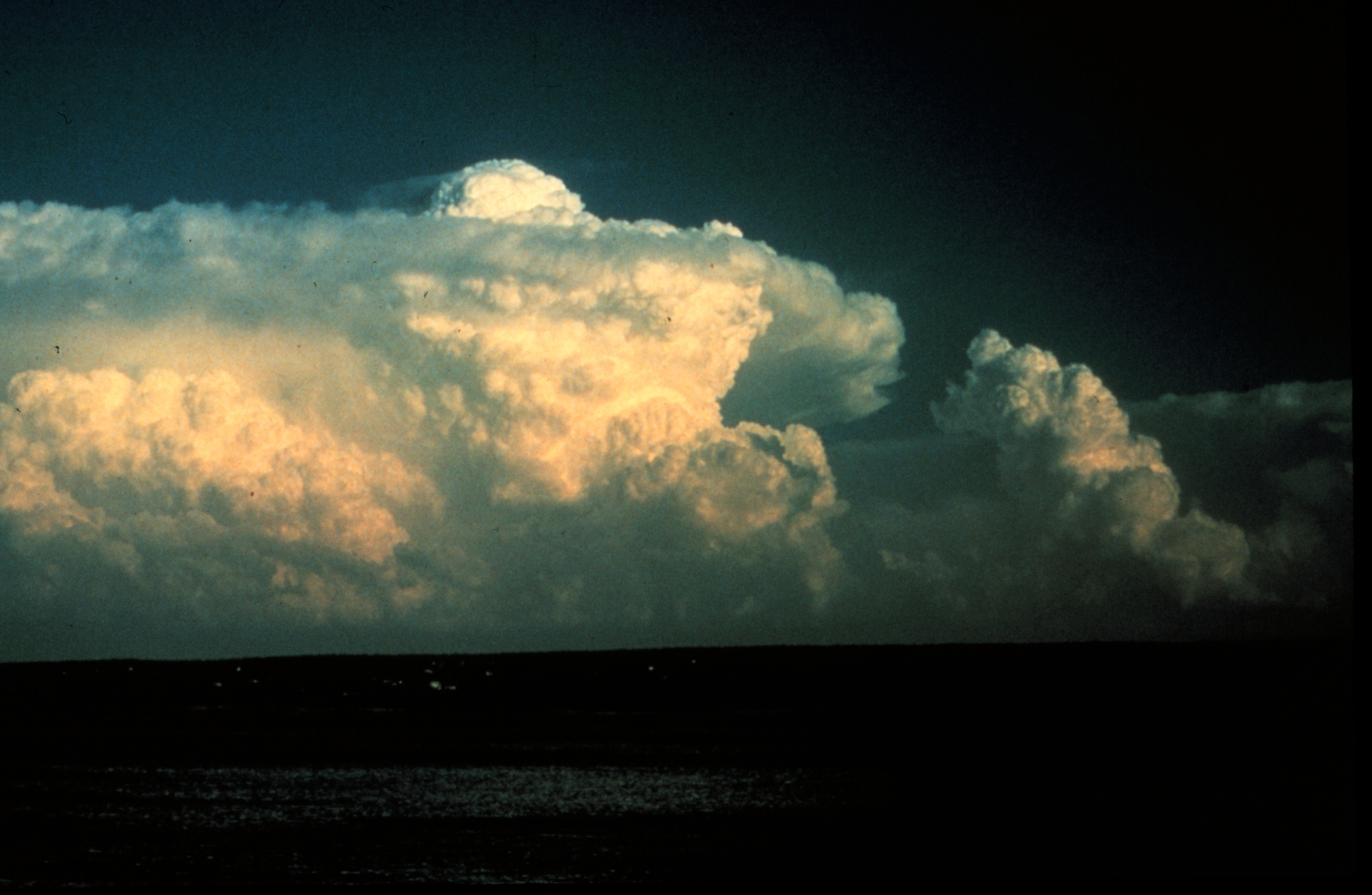
An overshooting top protruding above the anvil at the top of a thunderstorm

An overshooting top (or penetrating top) is a dome-like protrusion shooting out of the top of the anvil of a thunderstorm and into the lower stratosphere. When an overshooting top is present for 10 minutes or longer, it is a strong indication that the storm is severe.

== Formation ==
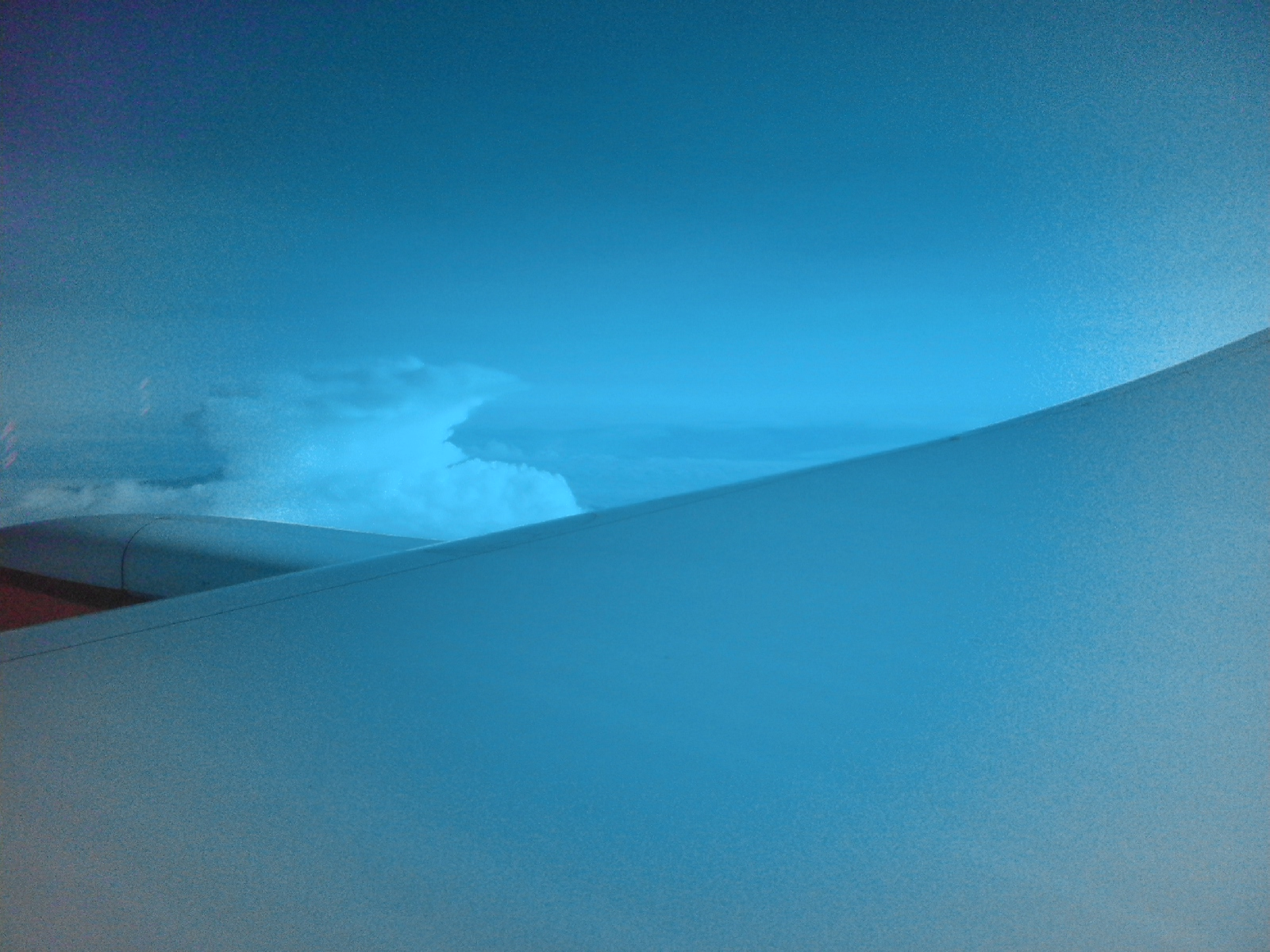
Overshooting top of a cumulonimbus viewed from a plane crossing the Democratic Republic of Congo. Airliners typically fly at an altitude ranging from 10 km to 13 km, at the tropopause.

When a thunderstorm forms, clouds build vertically into the atmosphere until the storm's updraft (warm rising air) has reached the equilibrium level (EL); the point where the surrounding air is about the same temperature or even warmer. This point of equilibrium is often marked by the tropopause. Rather than continuing to rise into the stratosphere, the vertical cloud growth abruptly stops, and instead clouds spread horizontally, forming an "anvil" shape on top of the thunderstorm.

An overshooting top forms when a thunderstorm's updraft, due to momentum from rapid ascent and strength of lifting through the free convective layer (FCL), protrudes its equilibrium level, forming a dome-like structure above the anvil. This can occur with any cumulonimbus cloud when instability is high. Whereas anvils form at the equilibrium level, overshooting tops continue to the maximum parcel level (MPL).

=== Above-anvil cirrus plume ===
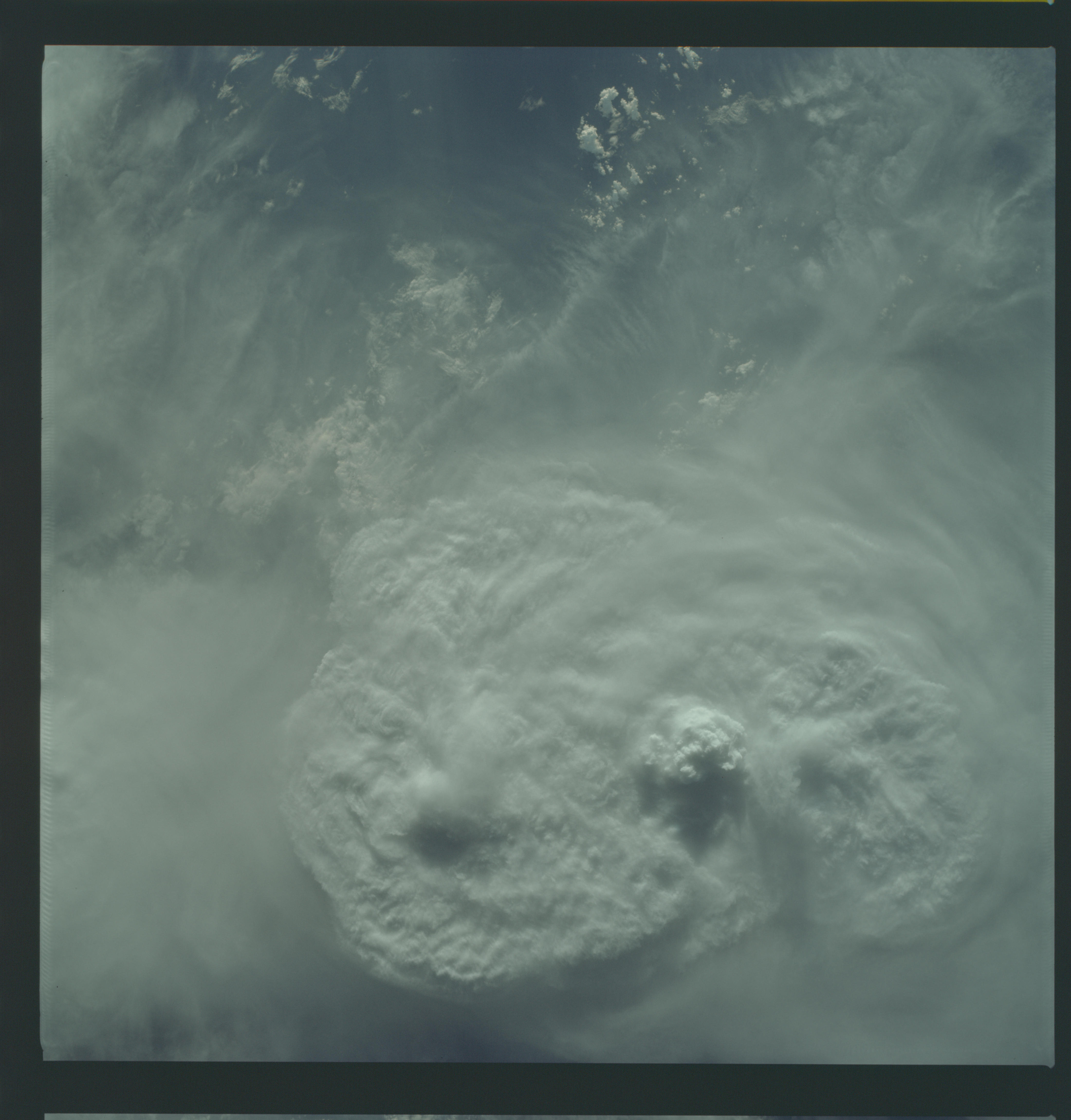
Cirrus plumes in the wake of overshooting tops may be indicators of severe weather

The strong updrafts delineated by overshooting tops can act as a barrier against the surrounding flow of air. Fast stratospheric winds may rise slightly upon encountering overshooting tops, cooling and producing a turbulent wake of cooler temperatures downstream of the updraft. This interaction also sheds ice and water vapor from the anvil cloud, forming a plume of cirrus emanating from the updraft region, though this is most evident in mid-latitude environments where the tropopause is typically lower and the associated inversion wider. These cirrus plumes may be warmer than the underlying anvil cloud due to the mixing of air from the warmer stratosphere. Termed above-anvil cirrus plumes (AACP), the emergence of such features on satellite imagery have been associated with severe weather events. A 2018 study published in Weather and Forecasting found that 73 percent of significant severe weather reports in the United States were associated with storms producing AACPs and that AACPs emerged an average of 31 minutes before the issuance of severe weather warnings. Simulations suggest that overshooting tops behave like hydraulic jumps in the presence of strong winds aloft, allowing the transport of over 7 t (7.7 tons) of water vapor into the lower stratosphere per second.

== Severe weather ==
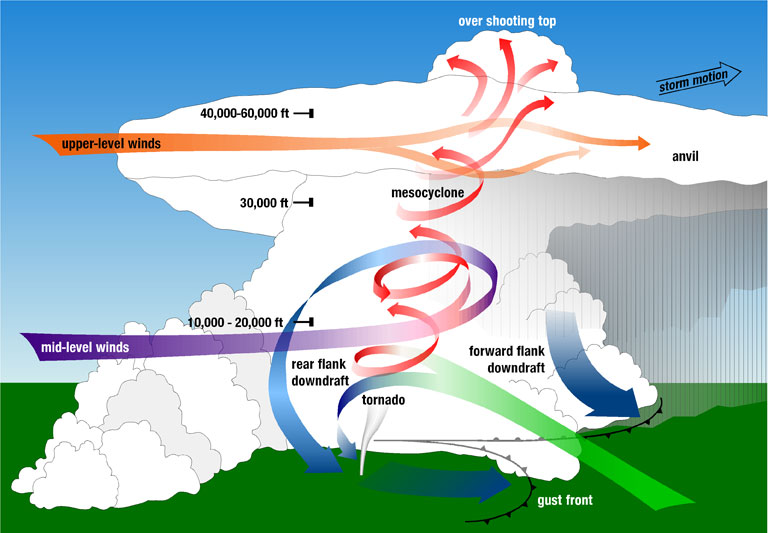
Diagram of a supercell thunderstorm, which shows the overshooting top rising above the anvil cloud.

Many thunderstorms exhibit an overshooting top at some point in their life cycle. In weaker thunderstorms, the overshooting top is short-lived, and often takes on a wispy appearance. If the overshooting top is rising and falling in a cyclical fashion with each protrusion persisting only a few minutes, then it could indicate the storm is pulsing and not as strong as a storm with a continuous overshooting top.

An overshooting top lasting for more than 10 minutes is a sign of a strong updraft in a thunderstorm, indicating a strong likelihood the storm is producing severe weather. If the overshooting top is continuous, it's an indication of enhanced probability that the storm is a supercell, i.e. a rotating storm. During a strong tornado, the overshooting top may roll or fold over as new activity climbs up the back while the front of the overshooting top collapses into the storm. During a long-track tornado, the entire top of the storm, including the overshooting top, may drop by thousands of feet.

== Storm features ==
A storm powerful enough to produce a lasting overshooting top typically produces the following:

- Heavy rain; a deluge of rain could fall from this storm in a short amount of time.
- Strong straight-line wind from downbursts; the storm clouds have powerful winds churning inside them. These winds are likely to be felt at the surface and also a threat to aviation aloft.
- Sometimes a tornado may form; most strong tornadoes are associated with mesocyclones located near the interchange of the rotating updraft and the rear flank downdraft (RFD).
- Hail; if the updraft is strong enough to produce an overshooting top it can also carry large hail.
- A storm that features an overshooting top is a thunderstorm, and is thus likely to produce lightning.

== See also ==
- Atmospheric convection
- Atmospheric thermodynamics
