= Convective temperature =

The convective temperature (CT or T_{c}) is the approximate temperature that air near the surface must reach for cloud formation without mechanical lift. In such case, cloud base begins at the convective condensation level (CCL), whilst with mechanical lifting (such as from low-pressure areas located in the lower troposphere, frontal systems, surface boundaries, gravity waves, and convergence zones), condensation begins at the lifted condensation level (LCL). Convective temperature is important to forecasting thunderstorm development.

== See also ==
- Atmospheric convection
- Atmospheric thermodynamics
