= K-index (meteorology) =

Measurement related to thunderstorms

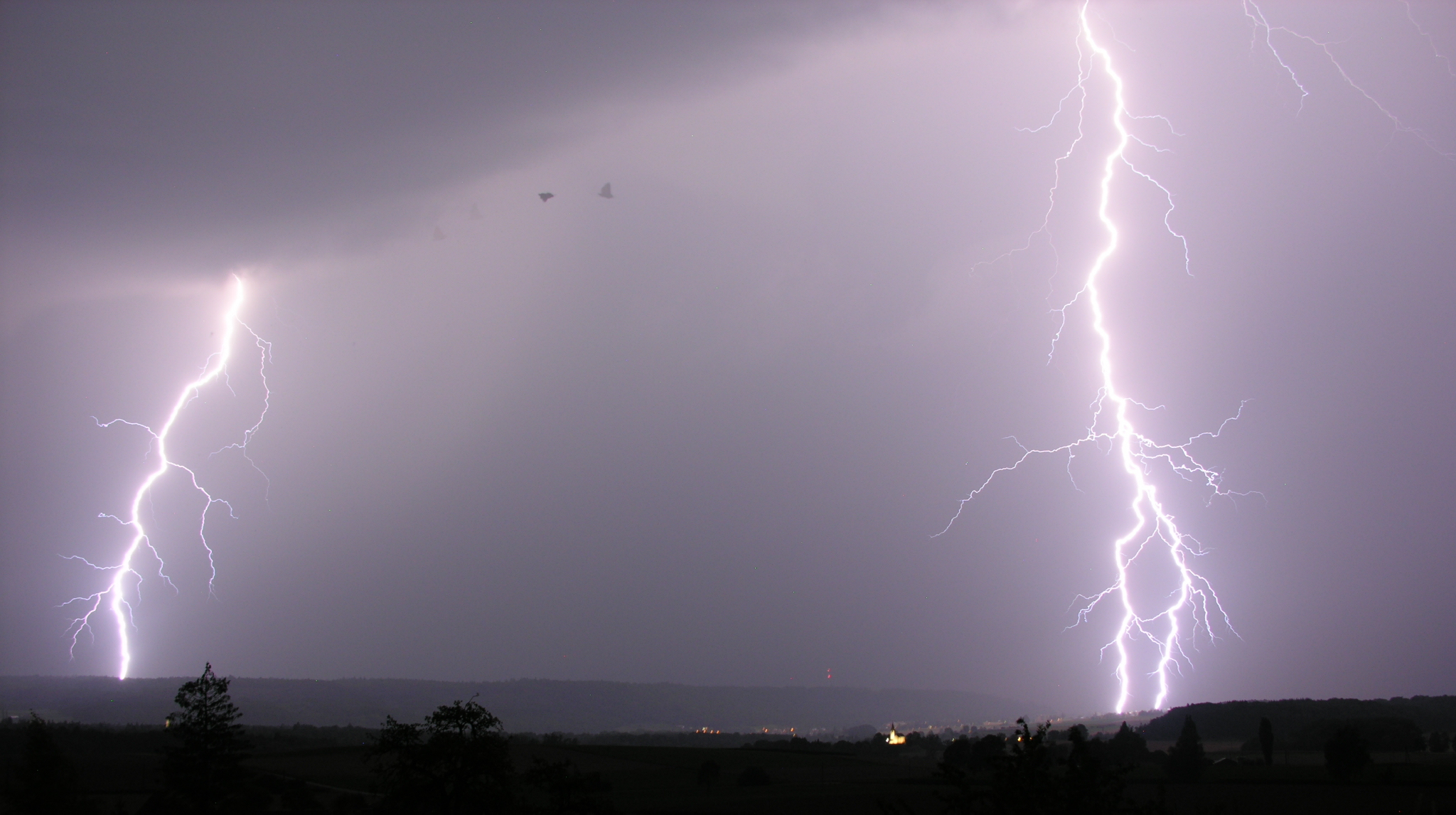
Lightning

The K-Index or George's Index is a measure of thunderstorm potential in meteorology. According to the National Weather Service, the index harnesses measurements such as "vertical temperature lapse rate, moisture content of the lower atmosphere, and the vertical extent of the moist layer." It was developed by the American meteorologist Joseph J. George, and published in the 1960 book Weather Forecasting for Aeronautics.

== Definition ==
The index is derived arithmetically by:

$K = ( T_{850} - T_{500} ) + T_{d_{850}} - ( T_{700} - T_{d_{700}} )$

Where :

$T_{d_{850}}$ = Dew point at 850 hPa
$T_{850}$ = Temperature at 850 hPa
$T_{d_{700}}$ = Dew point at 700 hPa
$T_{700}$ = Temperature at 700 hPa
$T_{500}$ = Temperature at 500 hPa

== Interpretation ==
The K Index is related to the probability of occurrence of a thunderstorm. It was developed with the idea that Potential = 4 x (KI - 15), which gives the following interpretation:

K-index values vs. Thunderstorm Probability
K-index value (in °C)	Thunderstorm Probability
Less than 20	None
20 to 25	Isolated thunderstorms
26 to 30	Widely scattered thunderstorms
31 to 35	Scattered thunderstorms
Above 35	Numerous thunderstorms
