= Equilibrium level =

In meteorology, the equilibrium level (EL), or level of neutral buoyancy (LNB), or limit of convection (LOC), is the height at which a rising parcel of air is at the same temperature as its environment.

Diagram showing an air parcel path when raised along B-C-E compared to the surrounding air mass Temperature (T) and humidity (Tw)

This means that unstable air is now stable when it reaches the equilibrium level and convection stops. This level is often near the tropopause and can be indicated as near where the anvil of a thunderstorm because it is where the thunderstorm updraft is finally cut off, except in the case of overshooting tops where it continues rising to the maximum parcel level (MPL) due to momentum. More precisely, the cumulonimbus will stop rising around a few kilometres prior to reaching the level of neutral buoyancy and on average anvil glaciation occurs at a higher altitude over land than over sea (despite little difference in LNB from land to sea).

== See also ==
- Atmospheric thermodynamics
- Convective instability
- Level of free convection
- Lifted condensation level
