= Atmospheric convection =

Atmospheric phenomenon

Atmospheric convection is the vertical transport of heat and moisture in the atmosphere. It occurs when warmer, less dense air rises, while cooler, denser air sinks.

This process is driven by parcel-environment instability, meaning that a "parcel" of air is warmer and less dense than the surrounding environment at the same altitude. This difference in temperature and density (and sometimes humidity) causes the parcel to rise, a process known as buoyancy. This rising air, along with the compensating sinking air, leads to mixing, which in turn expands the height of the planetary boundary layer (PBL), the lowest part of the atmosphere directly influenced by the Earth's surface. This expansion contributes to increased winds, cumulus cloud development, and decreased surface dew points (the temperature below which condensation occurs).

Convection plays a crucial role in weather patterns, influencing cloud formation, wind, and the development of thunderstorms, which can be associated with severe weather phenomena like hail, downbursts, and tornadoes.

== Overview ==
Convection can produce different types of thunderstorms depending on atmospheric conditions. The amount of atmospheric instability and wind shear can favor varying types of individual storms and clusters of storms.

There are a few general archetypes of atmospheric instability that are used to explain convection (or lack thereof); a necessary but insufficient condition for convection is that the environmental lapse rate (the rate of decrease of temperature with height) is steeper than the lapse rate experienced by a rising parcel of air.

When this condition is met, upward-displaced air parcels can become buoyant and thus experience a further upward force. Buoyant convection begins at the level of free convection (LFC), above which an air parcel may ascend through the free convective layer (FCL) with positive buoyancy. Its buoyancy turns negative at the equilibrium level (EL), but the parcel's vertical momentum may carry it to the maximum parcel level (MPL) where the negative buoyancy decelerates the parcel to a stop. Integrating the buoyancy force over the parcel's vertical displacement yields convective available potential energy (CAPE), the joules of energy available per kilogram of potentially buoyant air. CAPE is an upper limit for an ideal undiluted parcel, and the square root of twice the CAPE is sometimes called a thermodynamic speed limit for updrafts, based on the simple kinetic energy equation.

However, such buoyant acceleration concepts give an oversimplified view of convection. Drag is an opposite force to counter buoyancy, so that parcel ascent occurs under a balance of forces, like the terminal velocity of a falling object. Buoyancy may be reduced by entrainment, which dilutes the parcel with environmental air.

Atmospheric convection is called "deep" when it extends from near the surface to above the 500 hPa level, generally stopping at the tropopause at around 200 hPa. Most atmospheric deep convection occurs in the tropics as the rising branch of the Hadley circulation and represents a strong local coupling between the surface and the upper troposphere which is largely absent in winter midlatitudes. Its counterpart in the ocean (deep convection downward in the water column) only occurs at a few locations.

== Initiation ==
A thermal column (or thermal) is a vertical section of rising air in the lower altitudes of the Earth's atmosphere. Thermals are created by the uneven heating of the Earth's surface from solar radiation. The Sun warms the ground, which in turn warms the air directly above it. The warmer air expands, becoming less dense than the surrounding air mass, and creating a thermal low. The mass of lighter air rises, and as it does, it cools due to its expansion at lower high-altitude pressures. It stops rising when it has cooled to the same temperature as the surrounding air. Associated with a thermal is a downward flow surrounding the thermal column. The downward-moving exterior is caused by colder air being displaced at the top of the thermal. Another convection-driven weather effect is the sea breeze.

=== Thunderstorms ===
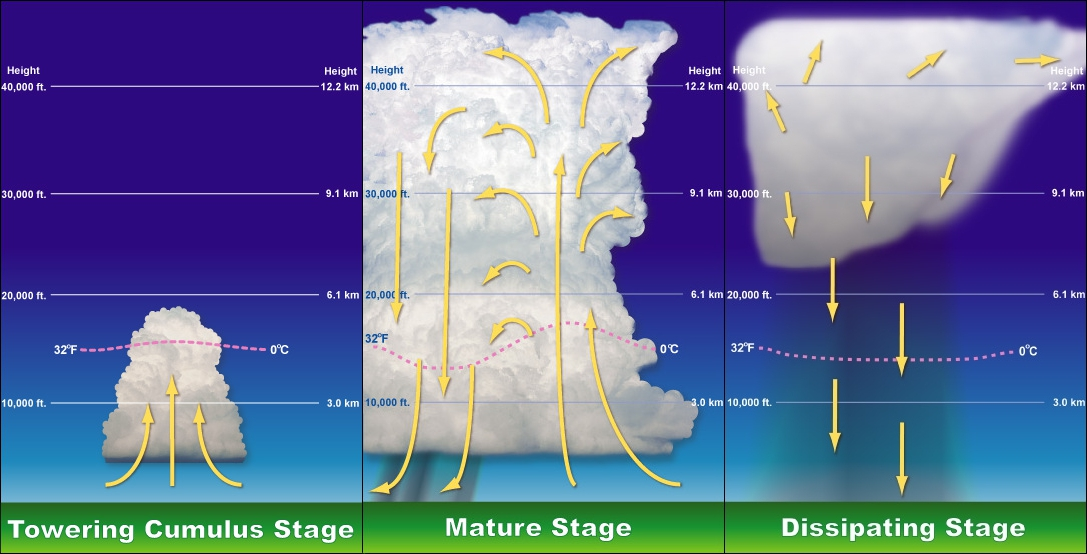
Stages of a thunderstorm's life.

Warm air has a lower density than cool air, so warm air rises within cooler air, similar to hot air balloons. Clouds form as relatively warmer air carrying moisture rises within cooler air. As the moist air rises, it cools causing some of the water vapor in the rising packet of air to condense. When the moisture condenses, it releases energy known as latent heat of vaporization which allows the rising packet of air to cool less than its surrounding air, continuing the cloud's ascension. If enough instability is present in the atmosphere, this process will continue long enough for cumulonimbus clouds to form, which supports lightning and thunder. Generally, thunderstorms require three conditions to form: moisture, an unstable airmass, and a lifting force (heat).

All thunderstorms, regardless of type, go through three stages: the developing stage, the mature stage, and the dissipation stage. The average thunderstorm has a 24 km (15 mi) diameter. Depending on the conditions present in the atmosphere, these three stages take an average of 30 minutes to go through.

=== Types ===
There are four main types of thunderstorms: single-cell, multicell, squall line (also called multicell line), and supercell. Which type forms depends on the instability and relative wind conditions at different layers of the atmosphere ("wind shear"). Single-cell thunderstorms form in environments of low vertical wind shear and last only 20–30 minutes. Organized thunderstorms and thunderstorm clusters/lines can have longer life cycles as they form in environments of significant vertical wind shear, which aids the development of stronger updrafts as well as various forms of severe weather. The supercell is the strongest of the thunderstorms, most commonly associated with large hail, high winds, and tornado formation.

The latent heat release from condensation is the determinant between significant convection and almost no convection at all. The fact that air is generally cooler during winter months, and therefore cannot hold as much water vapor and associated latent heat, is why significant convection (thunderstorms) are infrequent in cooler areas during that period. Thundersnow is one situation where forcing mechanisms provide support for very steep environmental lapse rates, which as mentioned before is an archetype for favored convection. The small amount of latent heat released from air rising and condensing moisture in a thundersnow also serves to increase this convective potential, although minimally. There are also three types of thunderstorms: orographic, air mass, and frontal.

=== Boundaries and forcing ===
Despite the fact that there might be a layer in the atmosphere that has positive values of CAPE, if the parcel does not reach or begin rising to that level, the most significant convection that occurs in the FCL will not be realized. This can occur for numerous reasons. Primarily, it is the result of a cap, or convective inhibition (CIN/CINH). Processes that can erode this inhibition are heating of the Earth's surface and forcing. Such forcing mechanisms encourage upward vertical velocity, characterized by a speed that is relatively low to what one finds in a thunderstorm updraft. Because of this, it is not the actual air being pushed to its LFC that "breaks through" the inhibition, but rather the forcing cools the inhibition adiabatically. This would counter, or "erode" the increase of temperature with height that is present during a capping inversion.

Forcing mechanisms that can lead to the eroding of inhibition are ones that create some sort of evacuation of mass in the upper parts of the atmosphere, or a surplus of mass in the low levels of the atmosphere, which would lead to upper-level divergence or lower-level convergence, respectively. An Upward vertical motion will often follow. Specifically, a cold front, sea/lake breeze, outflow boundary, or forcing through vorticity dynamics (differential positive vorticity advection) of the atmosphere such as with troughs, both shortwave and longwave. Jet streak dynamics through the imbalance of Coriolis and pressure gradient forces, causing subgeostrophic and supergeostrophic flows, can also create upward vertical velocities. There are numerous other atmospheric setups in which upward vertical velocities can be created.

== Concerns regarding severe deep moist convection ==
Buoyancy is a key to thunderstorm growth and is necessary for any of the severe threats within a thunderstorm. There are other processes, not necessarily thermodynamic, that can increase updraft strength. These include updraft rotation, low-level convergence, and evacuation of mass out of the top of the updraft via strong upper-level winds and the jet stream.

=== Hail ===
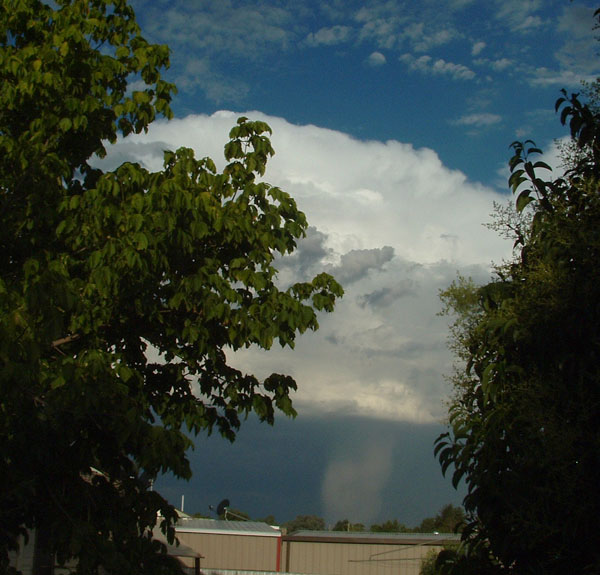
Hail shaft

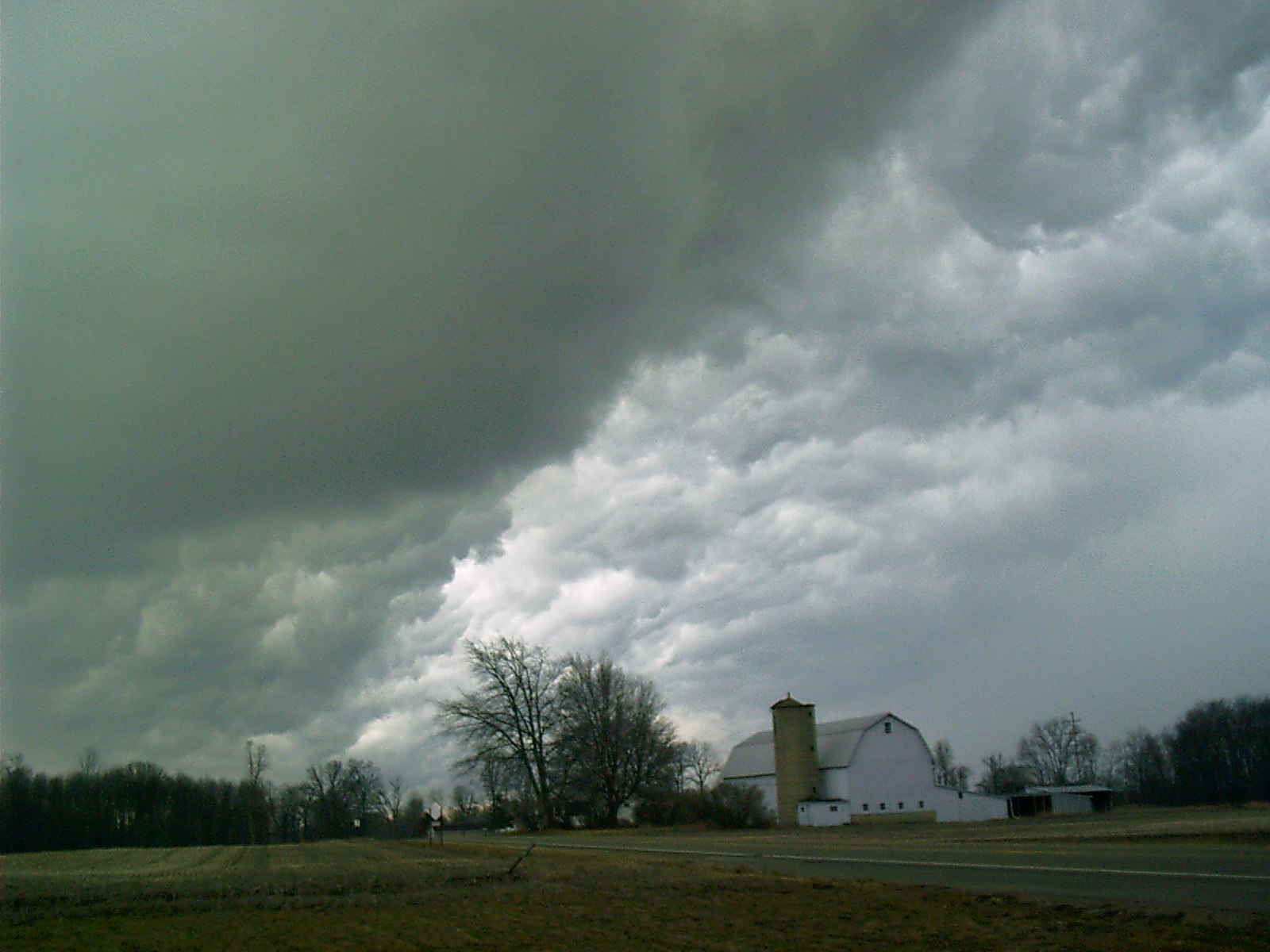
Severe thunderstorms containing hail can exhibit a characteristic green coloration.

Like other precipitation in cumulonimbus clouds hail begins as water droplets. As the droplets rise and the temperature goes below freezing, they become supercooled water and will freeze on contact with condensation nuclei. A cross-section through a large hailstone shows an onion-like structure. This means the hailstone is made of thick and translucent layers, alternating with layers that are thin, white, and opaque. Former theory suggested that hailstones were subjected to multiple descents and ascents, falling into a zone of humidity and refreezing as they were uplifted. This up-and-down motion was thought to be responsible for the successive layers of the hailstone. New research (based on theory and field study) has shown this is not necessarily true.

The storm's updraft, with upwardly directed wind speeds as high as 180 kilometres per hour (110 mph), blow the forming hailstones up the cloud. As the hailstone ascends it passes into areas of the cloud where the concentration of humidity and supercooled water droplets varies. The hailstone's growth rate changes depending on the variation in humidity and supercooled water droplets that it encounters. The accretion rate of these water droplets is another factor in the hailstone's growth. When the hailstone moves into an area with a high concentration of water droplets, it captures the latter and acquires a translucent layer. Should the hailstone move into an area where mostly water vapour is available, it acquires a layer of opaque white ice.

Furthermore, the hailstone's speed depends on its position in the cloud's updraft and its mass. This determines the varying thicknesses of the layers of the hailstone. The accretion rate of supercooled water droplets onto the hailstone depends on the relative velocities between these water droplets and the hailstone itself. This means that generally, the larger hailstones will form some distance from the stronger updraft where they can pass more time growing As the hailstone grows it releases latent heat, which keeps its exterior in a liquid phase. Undergoing "wet growth", the outer layer is sticky, or more adhesive, so a single hailstone may grow by collision with other smaller hailstones, forming a larger entity with an irregular shape.

The hailstone will keep rising in the thunderstorm until its mass can no longer be supported by the updraft. This may take at least 30 minutes based on the force of the updrafts in the hail-producing thunderstorm, whose top is usually greater than 10 kilometres (6.2 mi) high. It then falls toward the ground while continuing to grow, based on the same processes, until it leaves the cloud. It will later begin to melt as it passes into the air above freezing temperature

Thus, a unique trajectory in the thunderstorm is sufficient to explain the layer-like structure of the hailstone. The only case in which we can discuss multiple trajectories is in a multicellular thunderstorm where the hailstone may be ejected from the top of the "mother" cell and captured in the updraft of a more intense "daughter cell". This however is an exceptional case.

=== Downburst ===
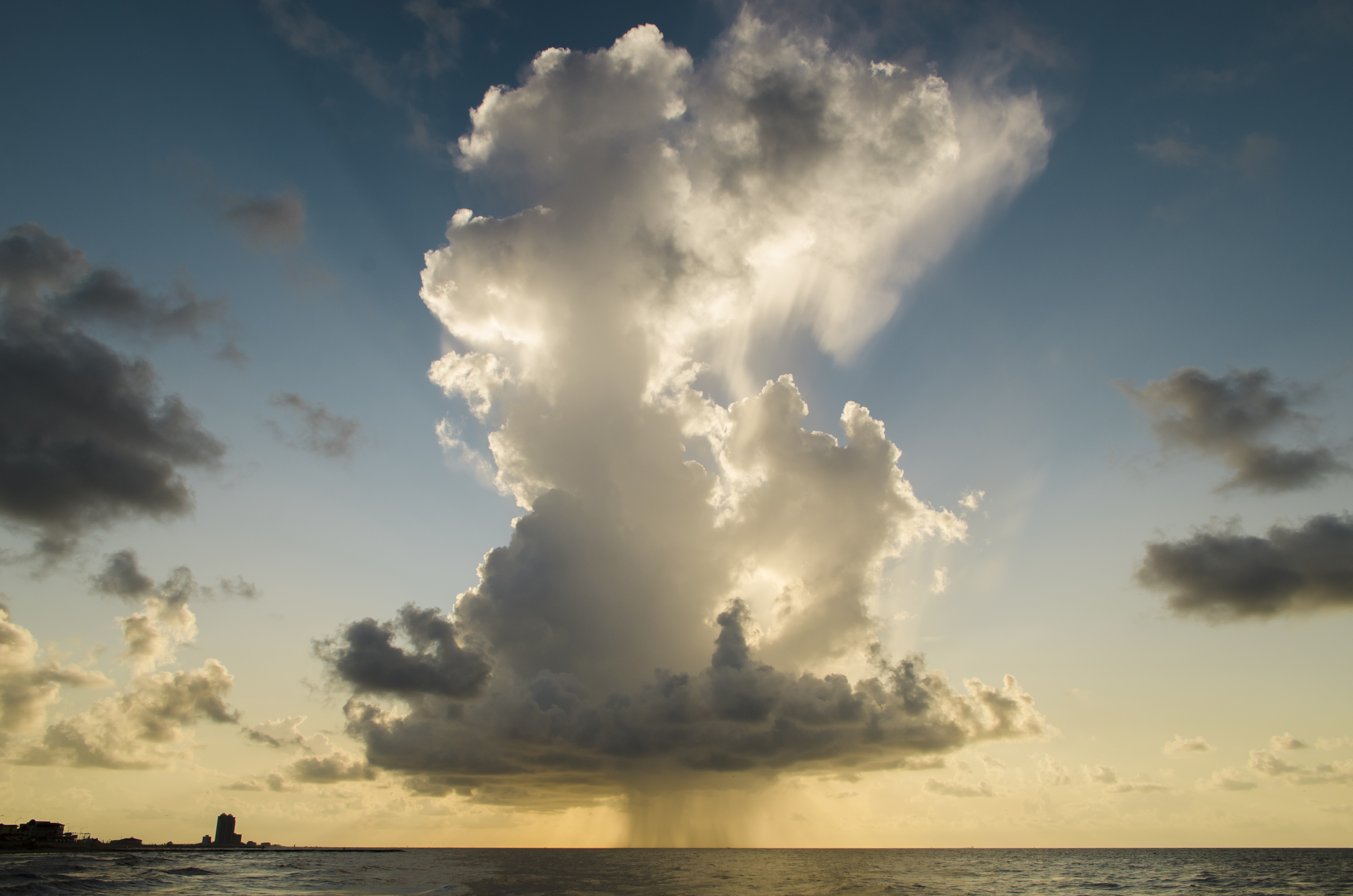
Cumulonimbus cloud over the Gulf of Mexico in Galveston, Texas

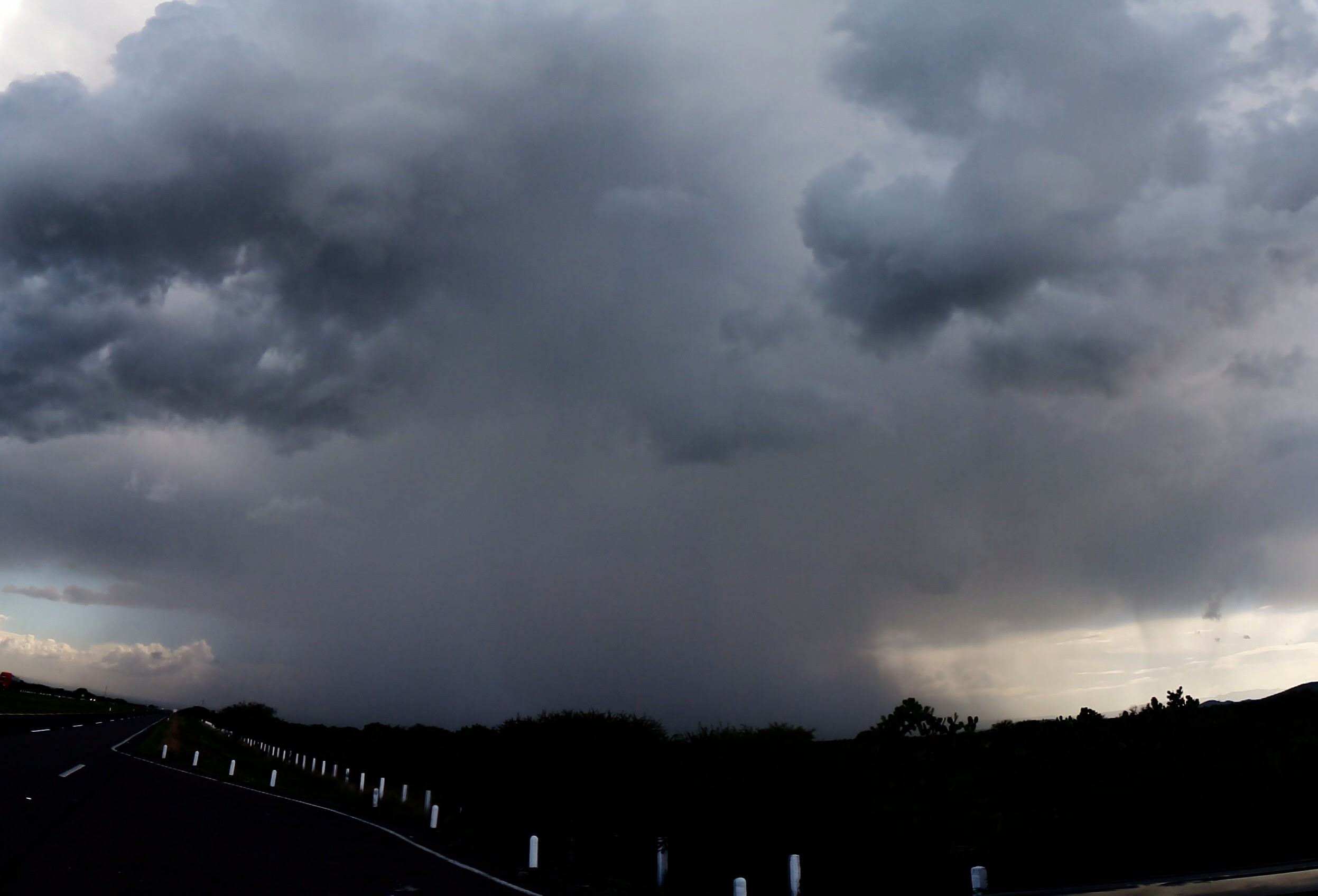
A downburst

A downburst is created by a column of sinking air that, after hitting ground level, spreads out in all directions and is capable of producing damaging straight-line winds of over 240 kilometres per hour (150 mph), often producing damage similar to, but distinguishable from, that caused by tornadoes. This is because the physical properties of a downburst are completely different from those of a tornado. Downburst damage will radiate from a central point as the descending column spreads out when impacting the surface, whereas tornado damage tends towards convergent damage consistent with rotating winds. To differentiate between tornado damage and damage from a downburst, the term straight-line winds is applied to damage from microbursts.

Downbursts are particularly strong downdrafts from thunderstorms. Downbursts in air that is precipitation free or contains virga are known as dry downbursts; those accompanied with precipitation are known as wet downbursts. Most downbursts are less than 4 kilometres (2.5 mi) in extent: these are called microbursts. Downbursts larger than 4 kilometres (2.5 mi) in extent are sometimes called macrobursts. Downbursts can occur over large areas. In the extreme case, a derecho can cover a huge area more than 320 kilometres (200 mi) wide and over 1,600 kilometres (990 mi) long, lasting up to 12 hours or more, and is associated with some of the most intense straight-line winds, but the generative process is somewhat different from that of most downbursts.

=== Tornado ===
The F5 tornado that struck Elie, Manitoba in 2007.

A tornado is a dangerous rotating column of air in contact with both the surface of the Earth and the base of a cumulonimbus cloud (thundercloud), or a cumulus cloud in rare cases. Tornadoes come in many sizes but typically form a visible condensation funnel whose narrowest end reaches the earth and is surrounded by a cloud of debris and dust.

Tornadoes wind speeds generally average between 64 kilometres per hour (40 mph) and 180 kilometres per hour (110 mph). They are approximately 75 metres (246 ft) across and travel a few kilometers before dissipating. Some attain wind speeds in excess of 480 kilometres per hour (300 mph), may stretch more than a 1.6 kilometres (0.99 mi) across, and maintain contact with the ground for more than 100 kilometres (62 mi).

Tornadoes, despite being one of the most destructive weather phenomena, are generally short-lived. A long-lived tornado generally lasts no more than an hour, but some have been known to last for 2 hours or longer (for example, the 1925 Tri-State tornado). Due to their relatively short duration, less information is known about the development and formation of tornadoes.

Generally any cyclone based on its size and intensity has different instability dynamics. The most unstable azimuthal wavenumber is higher for bigger cyclones .

== Measurement ==
The potential for convection in the atmosphere is often measured by an atmospheric temperature/dewpoint profile with height. This is often displayed on a Skew-T chart or other similar thermodynamic diagram. These can be plotted by a measured sounding analysis, which is the sending of a radiosonde attached to a balloon into the atmosphere to take the measurements with height. Forecast models can also create these diagrams, but are less accurate due to model uncertainties and biases, and have lower spatial resolution. Although, the temporal resolution of forecast model soundings is greater than the direct measurements, where the former can have plots for intervals of up to every 3 hours, and the latter as having only 2 per day (although when a convective event is expected a special sounding might be taken outside of the normal schedule of 00Z and then 12Z.).

== Other forecasting concerns ==
Atmospheric convection can also be responsible for and have implications on a number of other weather conditions. A few examples on the smaller scale would include: Convection mixing the planetary boundary layer (PBL) and allowing drier air aloft to the surface thereby decreasing dew points, creating cumulus-type clouds that can limit a small amount of sunshine, increasing surface winds, making outflow boundaries/and other smaller boundaries more diffuse, and the eastward propagation of the dryline during the day. On a larger scale, the rising of the air can lead to warm core surface lows, often found in the desert southwest.

== See also ==
- Air parcel
- Atmospheric subsidence
- Atmospheric thermodynamics
- Buoyancy
- Convective storm detection
- Thermal
