= Convective instability =

Ability of an air mass to resist vertical motion

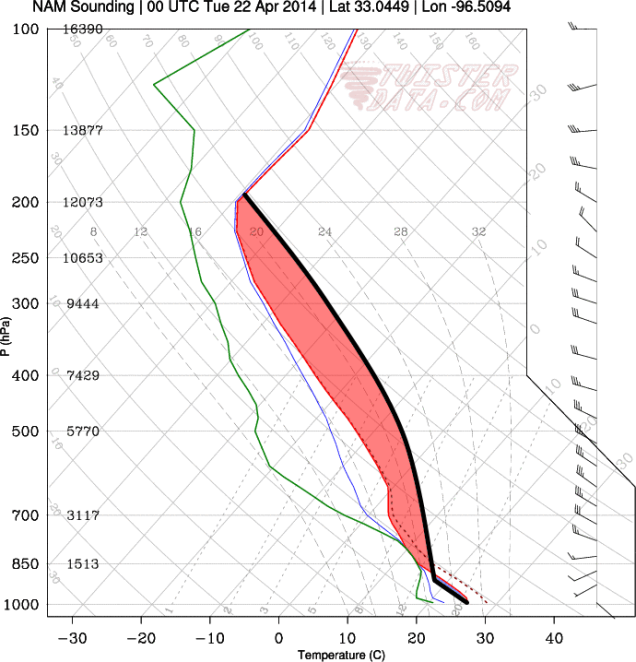
Convective Instability, denoted in the red highlighted region ("positive area"), on a Skew-T log-P diagram.

In meteorology, convective instability or stability of an air mass refers to its ability to resist vertical motion. A stable atmosphere makes vertical movement difficult, and small vertical disturbances dampen out and disappear. In an unstable atmosphere, vertical air movements (such as in orographic lifting, where an air mass is displaced upwards as it is blown by wind up the rising slope of a mountain range) tend to become larger, resulting in turbulent airflow and convective activity. Instability can lead to significant turbulence, extensive vertical clouds, and severe weather such as thunderstorms.

== Mechanism ==
Adiabatic cooling and heating are phenomena of rising or descending air. Rising air expands and cools due to the decrease in air pressure as altitude increases. The opposite is true of descending air; as atmospheric pressure increases, the temperature of descending air increases as it is compressed. Adiabatic heating and adiabatic cooling are terms used to describe this temperature change.

The adiabatic lapse rate is the rate at which the temperature of a rising or falling air mass lowers or increases per distance of vertical displacement. The ambient or environmental lapse rate is the temperature change in the (non-displaced) air per vertical distance. Instability results from difference between the adiabatic lapse rate of an air mass and the ambient lapse rate in the atmosphere.

If the adiabatic lapse rate is lower than the ambient lapse rate, an air mass displaced upward cools less rapidly than the air in which it is moving. Hence, such an air mass becomes warmer relative to the atmosphere. As warmer air is less dense, such an air mass would tend to continue to rise.

Conversely, if the adiabatic lapse rate is higher than the ambient lapse rate, an air mass displaced upward cools more rapidly than the air in which it is moving. Hence, such an airmass becomes cooler relative to the atmosphere. As cooler air is more dense, the rise of such an airmass would tend to be resisted.

When air rises, moist air in which condensation has occurred cools at a lower rate than dry air (including moist air in which condensation has not yet occurred). That is, for the same upwards vertical movement and starting temperature, a parcel of moist air will be warmer than a parcel of dry air. This is because of the condensation of water vapor in the air parcel due to expansion cooling. As water vapor condenses, latent heat is released into the air parcel. Moist air has more water vapor than dry air, so more latent heat is released into the parcel of moist air as it rises. Dry air does not have as much water vapor, therefore dry air cools at a higher rate with vertical movement than moist air. As a result of the latent heat that is released during water vapor condensation, moist air has a relatively lower adiabatic lapse rate than dry air. This makes moist air generally less stable than dry air (see convective available potential energy [CAPE]). The dry adiabatic lapse rate (for unsaturated air) is 3 °C (5.4 °F) per 1,000 vertical feet (300 m). The moist adiabatic lapse rate varies from 1.1 to 2.8 °C (2.0 to 5.0 °F) per 1,000 vertical feet (300 m).

The combination of moisture and temperature determine the stability of the air and the resulting weather. Cool, dry air is very stable and resists vertical movement, which leads to good and generally clear weather. The greatest instability occurs when the air is moist and warm, as it is in the tropical regions in the summer. Typically, thunderstorms appear on a daily basis in these regions due to the instability of the surrounding air.

The ambient lapse rate differs in different meteorological conditions but, on average, is 2 °C (3.6 °F) per 1,000 vertical feet (300 m).

== Lower tropospheric stability ==
Lower tropospheric stability (commonly referred to as LTS) is a meteorological parameter that is commonly used in atmospheric physics. It is computed at a given location on Earth and is defined as

$$LTS = \theta_{700}-\theta_0,$$

where $\theta_{700}$ is the potential temperature of an air parcel at the 700 hPa pressure level, and $\theta_{0}$ is the potential temperature at the surface.

It was first introduced as a simple but useful measure of the strength of the inversion that caps the planetary boundary layer on earth, and also indicates the level of convective stability of an air column at a given location. Regions with negative LTS have a larger potential temperature on the surface than in the mid-troposphere, which makes the air column unstable and encourages convection. There is a major limitation of this measure of stability however, which is that it does not take the thermodynamic properties (saturation mixing ratio and therefore the shape of adiabats in the lower troposphere) of the air into account. A more refined measure of stability has since been developed, named the estimated inversion strength, which pays closer attention to the thermodynamic properties of the air in the lower troposphere.

== See also ==
- Free convective layer (FCL)
- Lifted index (LI)
- Conditional symmetric instability (CSI)
