= Level of free convection =

Diagram showing an air parcel path when raised along B-C-E compared to the surrounding air mass Temperature (T) and humidity (Tw); see CAPE

The level of free convection (LFC) is the altitude in the atmosphere where an air parcel lifted adiabatically until saturation becomes warmer than the environment at the same level, so that positive buoyancy can initiate self-sustained convection.

== Finding the LFC ==
The usual way of finding the LFC is to lift a parcel from a lower level along the dry adiabatic lapse rate until it crosses the saturated mixing ratio line of the parcel: this is the lifted condensation level (LCL). From there on, follow the moist adiabatic lapse rate until the temperature of the parcel reaches the air mass temperature, at the equilibrium level (EL). If the temperature of the parcel along the moist adiabat is warmer than the environment on further lift, one has found the LFC.

== Use ==
Since the volume of the parcel is larger than the surrounding air after LFC by the ideal gas law (PV = nRT), it is less dense and becomes buoyant rising until its temperature (at EL) equals the surrounding airmass. If the airmass has one or many LFC, it is potentially unstable and may lead to convective clouds like cumulus and cumulonimbus clouds.

From the level of free convection to the point where the ascending parcel again becomes colder than its surroundings, the equilibrium level (EL), any air parcel gain kinetic energy which is calculated by its Convective available potential energy (CAPE), giving the potential for severe weather.

== See also ==
- Atmospheric convection
- Atmospheric thermodynamics
