= Atmospheric thermodynamics =

Study of heat-to-work transformations and their reverse

Atmospheric thermodynamics is the study of heat-to-work transformations (and their reverse) that take place in the Earth's atmosphere and manifest as weather or climate. Atmospheric thermodynamics use the laws of classical thermodynamics, to describe and explain such phenomena as the properties of moist air, the formation of clouds, atmospheric convection, boundary layer meteorology, and vertical instabilities in the atmosphere. Atmospheric thermodynamic diagrams are used as tools in the forecasting of storm development. Atmospheric thermodynamics forms a basis for cloud microphysics and convection parameterizations used in numerical weather models and is used in many climate considerations, including convective-equilibrium climate models.

== Overview ==
The atmosphere is an example of a non-equilibrium system. Atmospheric thermodynamics describes the effect of buoyant forces that cause the rise of less dense (warmer) air, the descent of more dense air, and the transformation of water from liquid to vapor (evaporation) and its condensation. Those dynamics are modified by the force of the pressure gradient and that motion is modified by the Coriolis force. The tools used include the law of energy conservation, the ideal gas law, specific heat capacities, the assumption of isentropic processes (in which entropy is a constant), and moist adiabatic processes (during which no energy is transferred as heat). Most of tropospheric gases are treated as ideal gases and water vapor, with its ability to change phase from vapor, to liquid, to solid, and back is considered one of the most important trace components of air.

Advanced topics are phase transitions of water, homogeneous and in-homogeneous nucleation, effect of dissolved substances on cloud condensation, role of supersaturation on formation of ice crystals and cloud droplets. Considerations of moist air and cloud theories typically involve various temperatures, such as equivalent potential temperature, wet-bulb and virtual temperatures. Connected areas are energy, momentum, and mass transfer, turbulence interaction between air particles in clouds, convection, dynamics of tropical cyclones, and large scale dynamics of the atmosphere.

The major role of atmospheric thermodynamics is expressed in terms of adiabatic and diabatic forces acting on air parcels included in primitive equations of air motion either as grid resolved or subgrid parameterizations. These equations form a basis for the numerical weather and climate predictions.

== History ==
In the early 19th century thermodynamicists such as Sadi Carnot, Rudolf Clausius, and Émile Clapeyron developed mathematical models on the dynamics of fluid bodies and vapors related to the combustion and pressure cycles of atmospheric steam engines; one example is the Clausius–Clapeyron equation. In 1873, thermodynamicist Willard Gibbs published "Graphical Methods in the Thermodynamics of Fluids."

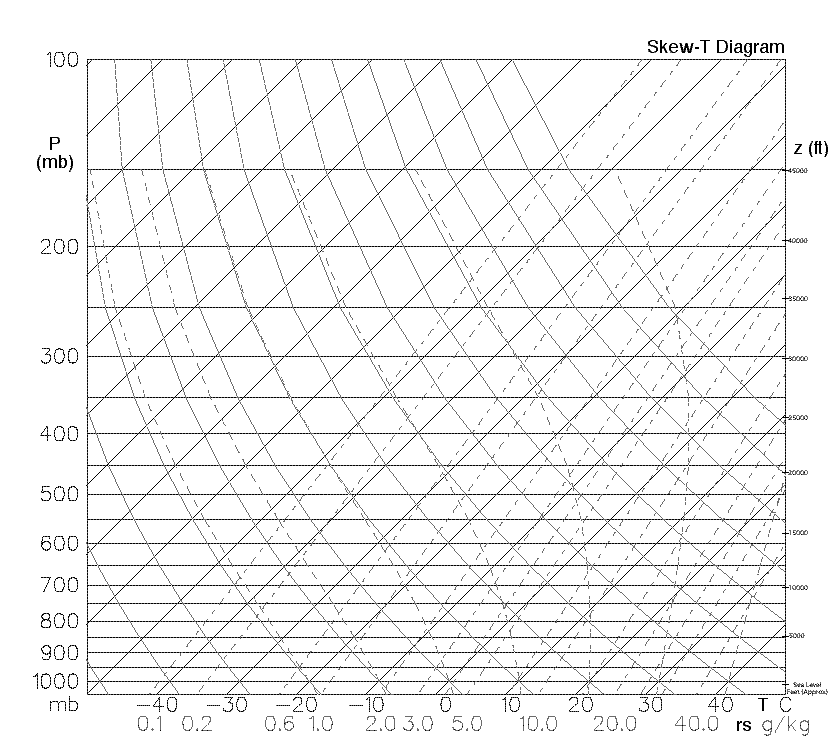
Thermodynamic diagram developed in the 19th century is still used to calculate quantities such as convective available potential energy or air stability.

These sorts of foundations naturally began to be applied towards the development of theoretical models of atmospheric thermodynamics which drew the attention of the best minds. Papers on atmospheric thermodynamics appeared in the 1860s that treated such topics as dry and moist adiabatic processes. In 1884 Heinrich Hertz devised first atmospheric thermodynamic diagram (emagram). Pseudo-adiabatic process was coined by von Bezold describing air as it is lifted, expands, cools, and eventually precipitates its water vapor; in 1888 he published voluminous work entitled "On the thermodynamics of the atmosphere".

In 1911 von Alfred Wegener published a book "Thermodynamik der Atmosphäre", Leipzig, J. A. Barth. From here the development of atmospheric thermodynamics as a branch of science began to take root. The term "atmospheric thermodynamics", itself, can be traced to Frank W. Very's 1919 publication: "The radiant properties of the earth from the standpoint of atmospheric thermodynamics" (Occasional scientific papers of the Westwood Astrophysical Observatory). By the late 1970s various textbooks on the subject began to appear. Today, atmospheric thermodynamics is an integral part of weather forecasting.

=== Chronology ===
- 1751 Charles Le Roy recognized dew point temperature as point of saturation of air
- 1782 Jacques Charles made hydrogen balloon flight measuring temperature and pressure in Paris
- 1784 Concept of variation of temperature with height was suggested
- 1801–1803 John Dalton developed his laws of pressures of vapours
- 1804 Joseph Louis Gay-Lussac made balloon ascent to study weather
- 1805 Pierre Simon Laplace developed his law of pressure variation with height
- 1841 James Pollard Espy publishes paper on convection theory of cyclone energy
- 1856 William Ferrel presents dynamics causing westerlies
- 1889 Hermann von Helmholtz and John William von Bezold used the concept of potential temperature, von Bezold used adiabatic lapse rate and pseudoadiabat
- 1893 Richard Asman constructs first aerological sonde (pressure-temperature-humidity)
- 1894 John Wilhelm von Bezold used concept of equivalent temperature
- 1926 Sir Napier Shaw introduced tephigram
- 1933 Tor Bergeron published paper on "Physics of Clouds and Precipitation" describing precipitation from supercooled (due to condensational growth of ice crystals in presence of water drops)
- 1946 Vincent J. Schaeffer and Irving Langmuir performed the first cloud seeding experiment
- 1986 K. Emanuel conceptualizes tropical cyclone as Carnot heat engine

== Applications ==
=== Hadley Circulation ===
The Hadley Circulation can be considered as a heat engine. The Hadley circulation is identified with rising of warm and moist air in the equatorial region with the descent of colder air in the subtropics corresponding to a thermally driven direct circulation, with consequent net production of kinetic energy. The thermodynamic efficiency of the Hadley system, considered as a heat engine, has been relatively constant over the 1979~2010 period, averaging 2.6%. Over the same interval, the power generated by the Hadley regime has risen at an average rate of about 0.54 TW per yr; this reflects an increase in energy input to the system consistent with the observed trend in the tropical sea surface temperatures.

=== Tropical cyclone Carnot cycle ===
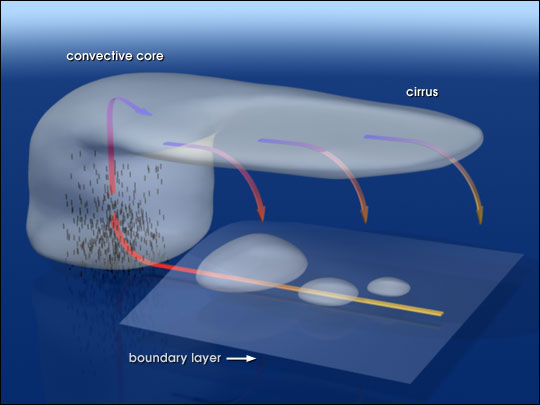
Air is being moistened as it travels toward convective system. Ascending motion in a deep convective core produces air expansion, cooling, and condensation. Upper-level outflow visible as an anvil cloud is eventually descending conserving mass (rysunek – Robert Simmon).

The thermodynamic behavior of a hurricane can be modelled as a heat engine that operates between the heat reservoir of the sea at a temperature of about 300K (27 °C) and the heat sink of the tropopause at a temperature of about 200K (−72 °C) and in the process converts heat energy into mechanical energy of winds. Parcels of air traveling close to the sea surface take up heat and water vapor, the warmed air rises and expands and cools as it does so causes condensation and precipitation. The rising air, and condensation, produces circulatory winds that are propelled by the Coriolis force, which whip up waves and increase the amount of warm moist air that powers the cyclone. Both a decreasing temperature in the upper troposphere or an increasing temperature of the atmosphere close to the surface will increase the maximum winds observed in hurricanes. When applied to hurricane dynamics it defines a Carnot heat engine cycle and predicts maximum hurricane intensity.

=== Water vapor and global climate change ===
The Clausius–Clapeyron relation shows how the water-holding capacity of the atmosphere increases by about 8% per Celsius increase in temperature. (It does not directly depend on other parameters like the pressure or density.) This water-holding capacity, or "equilibrium vapor pressure", can be approximated using the August-Roche-Magnus formula

$$e_s(T)= 6.1094 \exp \left( \frac{17.625T}{T+243.04} \right)$$

(where $e_s(T)$ is the equilibrium or saturation vapor pressure in hPa, and $T$ is temperature in degrees Celsius). This shows that when atmospheric temperature increases (e.g., due to greenhouse gases) the absolute humidity should also increase exponentially (assuming a constant relative humidity). However, this purely thermodynamic argument is subject of considerable debate because convective processes might cause extensive drying due to increased areas of subsidence, efficiency of precipitation could be influenced by the intensity of convection, and because cloud formation is related to relative humidity.

== See also ==
- Atmospheric convection
- Atmospheric temperature
- Atmospheric wave
- Chemical thermodynamics
- Cloud physics
- Equilibrium thermodynamics
- Fluid dynamics
- Non-equilibrium thermodynamics
- Thermodynamics

== Special topics ==
- Lorenz, E. N., 1955, Available potential energy and the maintenance of the general circulation, Tellus, 7, 157–167.
- Emanuel, K, 1986, Part I. An air-sea interaction theory for tropical cyclones, J. Atmos. Sci. 43, 585, (energy cycle of the mature hurricane has been idealized here as Carnot engine that converts heat energy extracted from the ocean to mechanical energy).
