= Fluid parcel =

Infinitesimal volume of fluid within a fluid flow

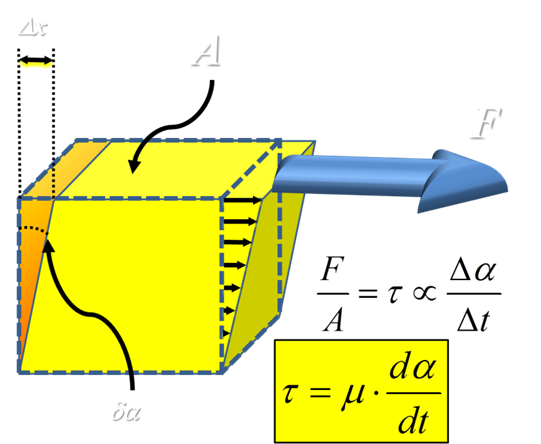
Diagram of a fluid parcel

In fluid dynamics, a fluid parcel, also known as a fluid element or material element, is an infinitesimal volume of fluid, identifiable throughout its dynamic history while moving with the fluid flow. As it moves, the mass of a fluid parcel remains constant, while—in a compressible flow—its volume may change, and its shape changes due to distortion by the flow. In an incompressible flow, the volume of the fluid parcel is also a constant (isochoric flow).

Material surfaces and material lines are the corresponding notions for surfaces and lines, respectively.

The mathematical concept of a fluid parcel is closely related to the description of fluid motion—its kinematics and dynamics—in a Lagrangian frame of reference. In this reference frame, fluid parcels are labelled and followed through space and time. But also in the Eulerian frame of reference the notion of fluid parcels can be advantageous, for instance in defining the material derivative, streamlines, streaklines, and pathlines; or for determining the Stokes drift.

The fluid parcels, as used in continuum mechanics, are to be distinguished from microscopic particles (molecules and atoms) in physics. Fluid parcels describe the average velocity and other properties of fluid particles, averaged over a length scale which is large compared to the mean free path, but small compared to the typical length scales of the specific flow under consideration. This requires the Knudsen number to be small, as is also a pre-requisite for the continuum hypothesis to be a valid one. Further note, that unlike the mathematical concept of a fluid parcel which can be uniquely identified—as well as exclusively distinguished from its direct neighbouring parcels—in a real fluid such a parcel would not always consist of the same particles. Molecular diffusion will slowly evolve the parcel properties.

== Bibliography ==
- Batchelor, George K. (1973). An introduction to fluid dynamics. Cambridge: Cambridge University Press. ISBN 978-0-521-09817-5.
- Gill, Adrian E. (1982). Atmosphere–ocean dynamics. New York: Academic Press. ISBN 978-0-12-283522-3.
- Thompson, Michael (2006). An introduction to astrophysical fluid dynamics. Imperial College Press. ISBN 978-1-86094-615-8.
- Bennett, Andrew (2006). Lagrangian fluid dynamics. Cambridge: Cambridge University Press. ISBN 978-0-521-85310-1.
- Badin, G.; Crisciani, F. (2018). Variational Formulation of Fluid and Geophysical Fluid Dynamics - Mechanics, Symmetries and Conservation Laws. Springer. p. 218. Bibcode:2018vffg.book.....B. doi:10.1007/978-3-319-59695-2. ISBN 978-3-319-59694-5. S2CID 125902566.
