= Accessory cloud =

Cloud dependent on a larger cloud system

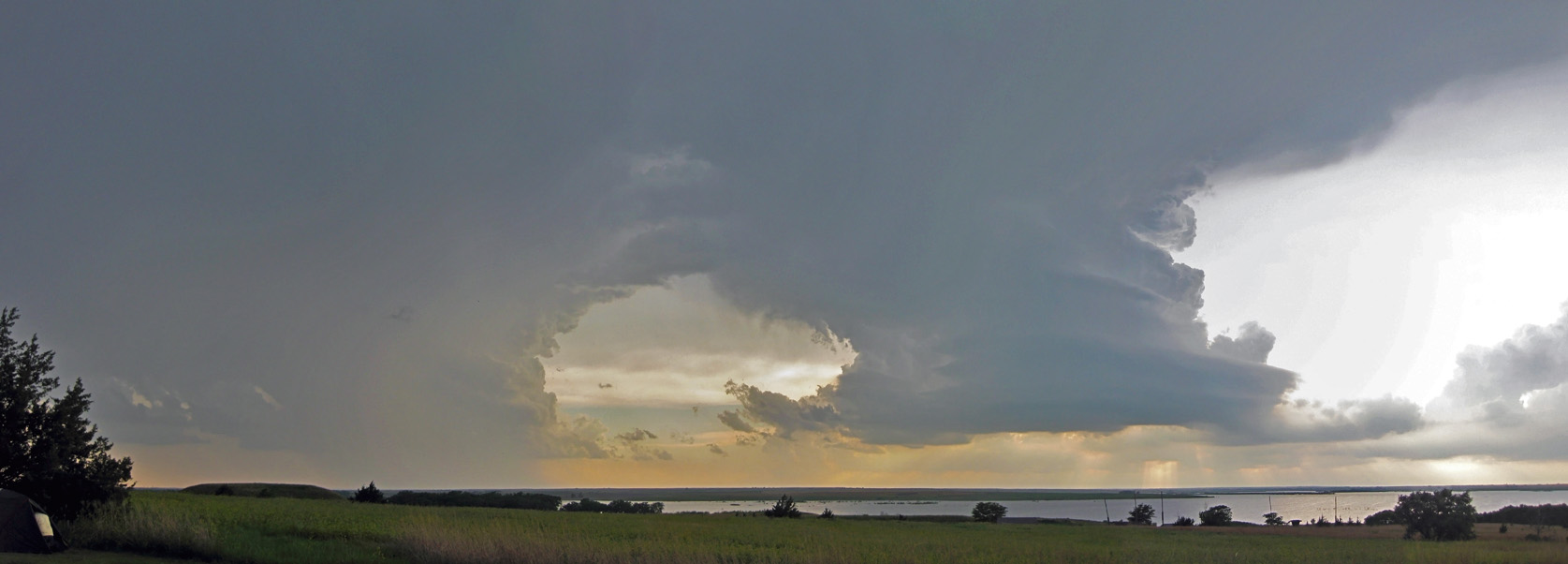
Wall cloud on the right under a cumulonimbus cloud

An accessory cloud is a cloud which is dependent on a larger cloud system for its development and continuance. It is often an appendage but also can be adjacent to the parent cloud system.

The arcus and roll clouds, shelf cloud, wall cloud, and scud are examples of low level or vertical accessory clouds whilst the anvil, and overshooting top, are examples of high level accessory clouds. The condensation funnel of funnel clouds and tornadoes are also accessory clouds. They are associated with deep moist convection and especially cumulonimbus, the primary cloud producing thunderstorms. The pileus and mammatus types can form at various altitude ranges depending on the main clouds with which they are associated. The World Meteorological Organization classifies most accessory clouds as supplementary features. The height range classification of a supplementary feature is the same as the parent cloud. As an example, the anvil cloud (supplementary feature incus) forms at high altitude but is not classified by the WMO as a high cloud because of its association with the genus cumulonimbus.

== Precipitation ==
It is very rare for any accessory cloud to generate its own precipitation (except for wall clouds). However, the parent cloud may generate precipitation. Precipitation from the parent cloud is often confused with the accessory cloud and observers think that the precipitation is actually falling from the accessory cloud.

== See also ==
- List of cloud types
