= Pileus (meteorology) =

Small, horizontal, lenticular cloud

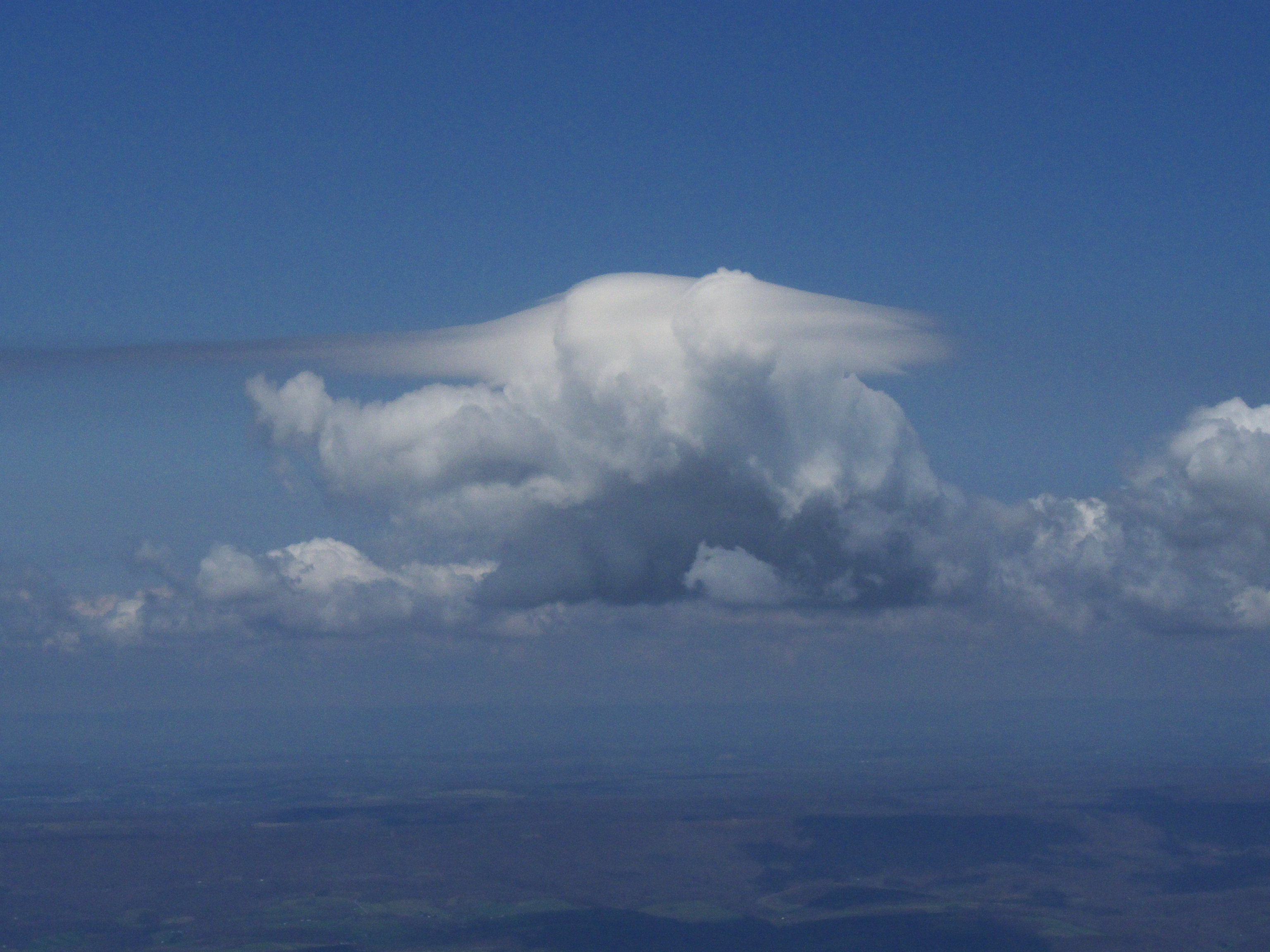
Pileus over a cumulus cloud

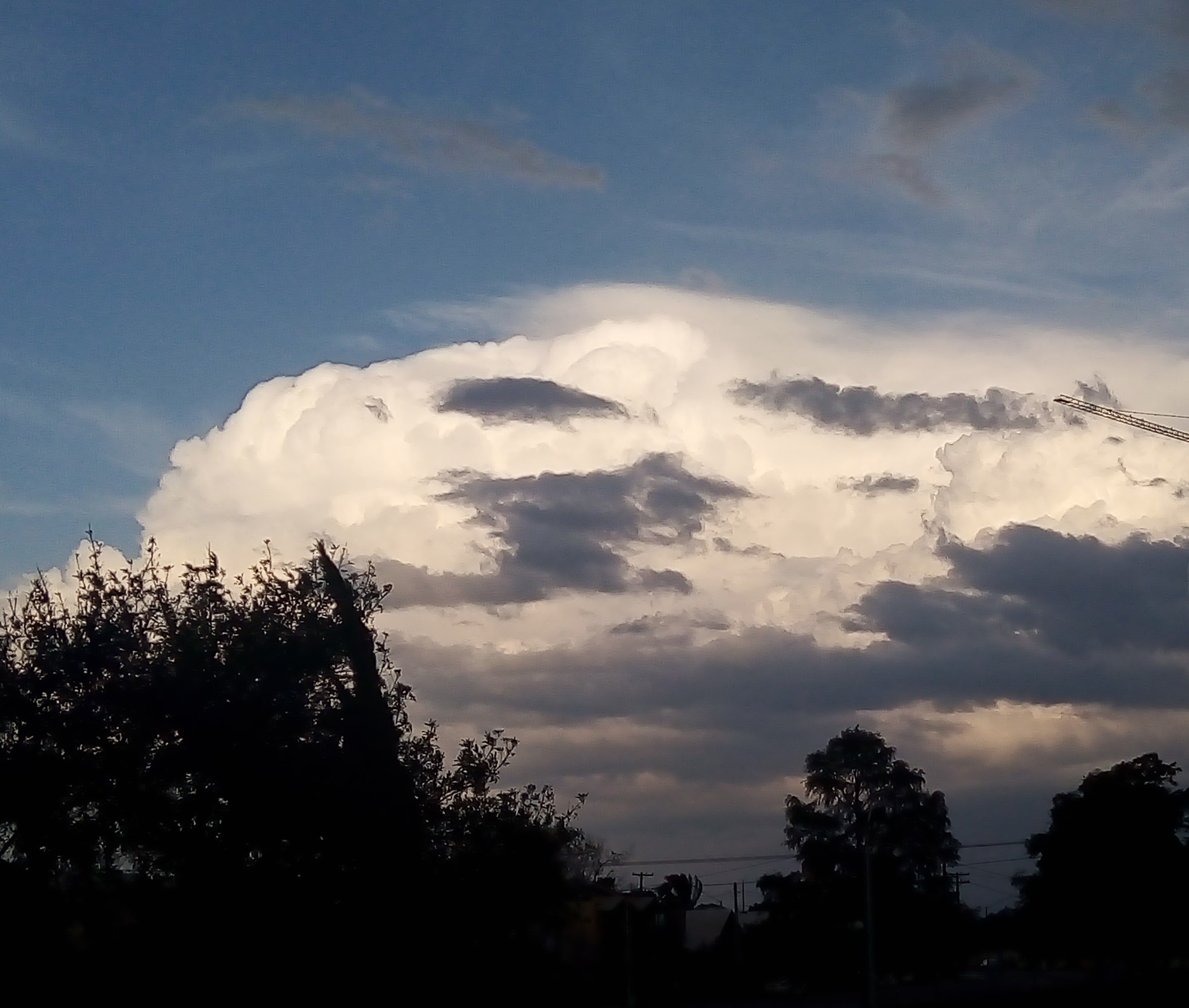
Pileus above a cumulonimbus cloud

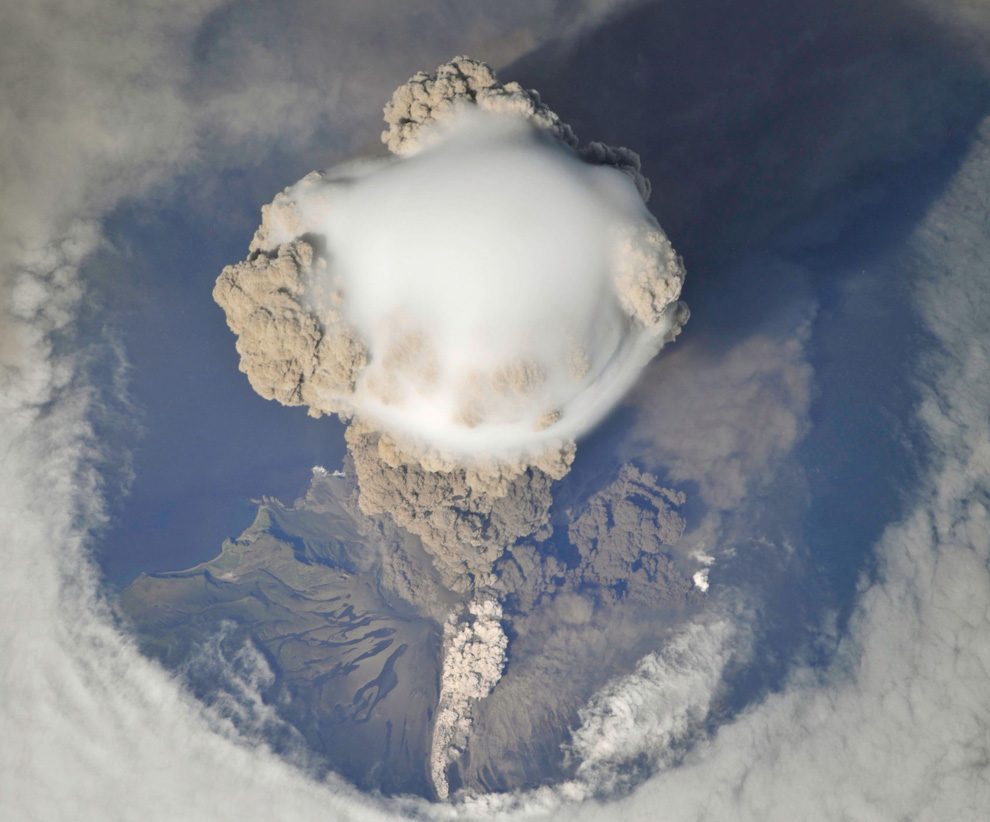
Pileus forming over the ash cloud from an eruption of Sarychev Peak

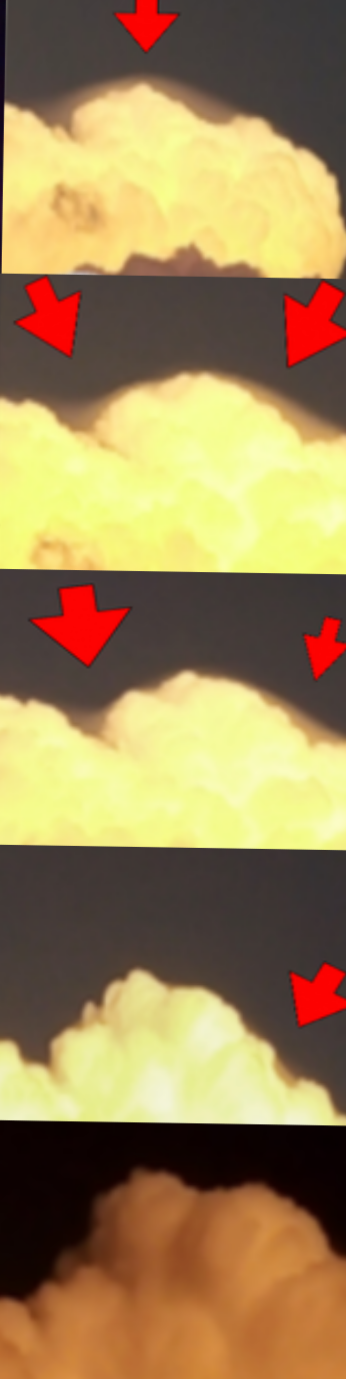
Cap cloud being absorbed into a cumulonimbus calvus cloud at sunset

A pileus (/ˈpaɪliəs/; Latin for 'cap'), also called scarf cloud or cap cloud, is a small, horizontal, lenticular cloud appearing above a cumulus or cumulonimbus cloud. Pileus clouds are often short-lived, appearing for typically only a few minutes, with the main cloud beneath them rising through convection to absorb them. Furthermore, the clouds are typically formed by drier air with a higher lifting condensation level, which often prevents vertical growth and leads to the smooth horizontal cap shape that the cloud is named for.

They are formed by strong updraft at lower altitudes, acting upon moist air above, causing the air to cool to its dew point as it rises. As such, they are usually indicators of severe weather, and a pileus found atop a cumulus cloud often foreshadows transformation into a cumulonimbus cloud, as it indicates a strong updraft within the cloud.

Pilei can also form above mountains, ash clouds, and pyrocumulus clouds from erupting volcanoes. Pilei form above some mushroom clouds of high-yield nuclear detonations.

== Appearance ==
Though the pileus cloud does not tend to grow vertically, sometimes several pileus clouds are observed above each other. The bright iridescent colors seen in pileus are sunlight diffracted in water vapor. Iridescent colors are strongest when the diffracting droplets are small and similar in size. The newly formed pileus droplet all of similar provenance are ideal for iridescence.

== Variants ==
When sheet of altostratus cloud is seen lower down and skirting a cumulonimbus cloud, it is classified as a velum cloud.

== Forecast ==
Pileus clouds indicate the parent cloud is growing rapidly, has plenty of moisture, and is highly unstable. This means the parent cloud could quickly grow to become a cumulonimbus cloud and continue to grow into a cumulonimbus incus cloud.

== See also ==
- Cloud iridescence
- Atmospheric convection
- Lenticular cloud
- Helm Wind
