= Cumulonimbus calvus =

Large cloud

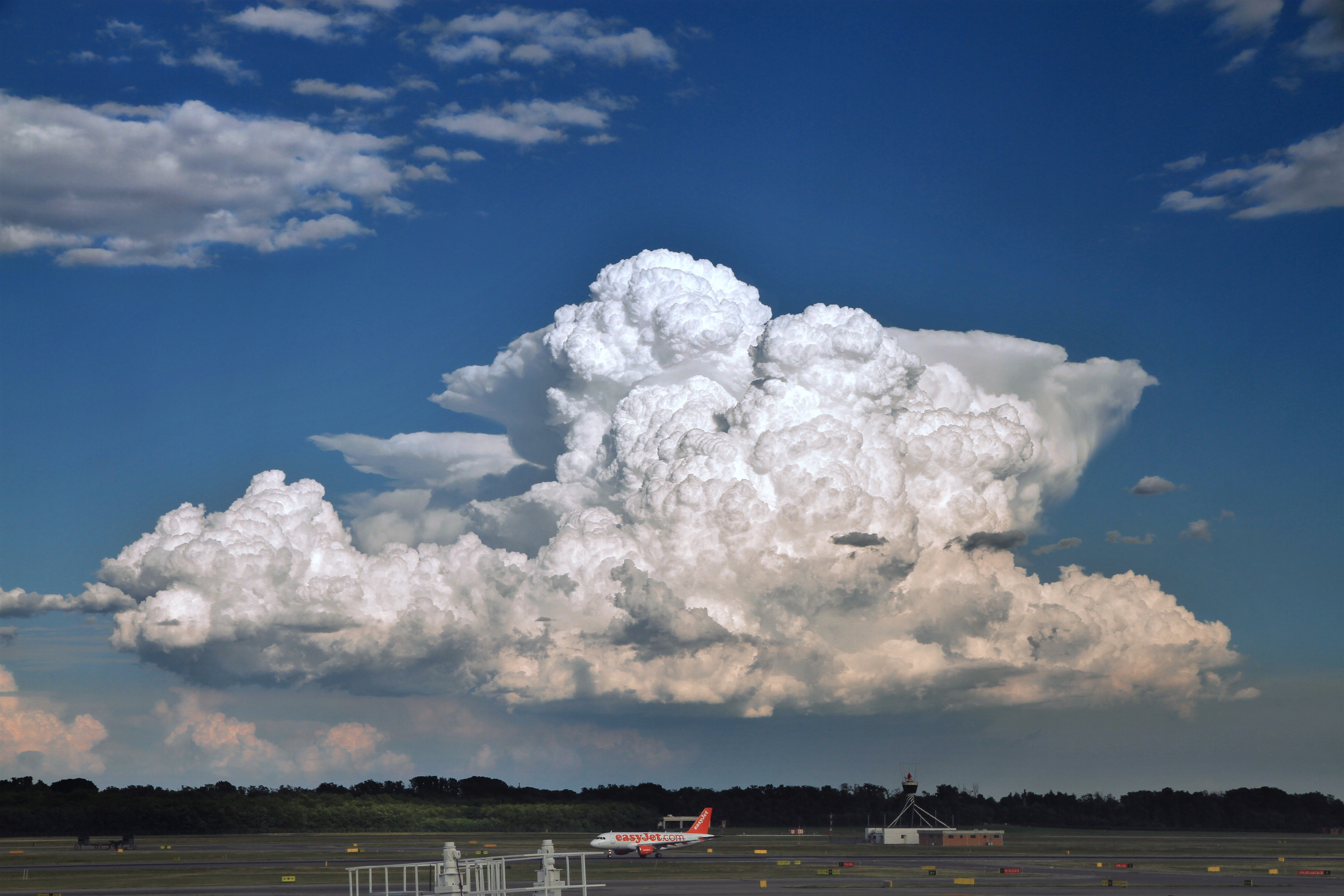
- Cumulonimbus calvus, with probable cumulonimbus incus in background over Milan Malpensa Airport, Milan, Italy
- Abbreviation: Cb cal
- Genus: Cumulonimbus (heap, rain)
- Species: Calvus (bald)
- Variety: None
- Classification: Family C (Low-level)
- Appearance: Dark-based storm cloud capable of impressive vertical growth without cirriform, hairless.
- Precipitation: Very common Rain, Snow, Snow pellets or Hail, heavy at times

Cumulonimbus calvus is a moderately tall cumulonimbus cloud that is capable of precipitation but has not yet reached the tropopause, which is the height of stratospheric stability at which cumulonimbus forms into cumulonimbus capillatus (fibrous-top) or cumulonimbus incus (anvil-top). Cumulonimbus calvus develops from cumulus congestus, and its further development, under auspicious conditions, will result in cumulonimbus incus.

This cloud consists mainly of water droplets. By definition of cumulonimbus cloud, at its top water droplets are transformed into ice crystals. But for cumulonimbus calvus, content of ice crystals are meager and polar are in early stage, so the cloud tops still look round and puffy.

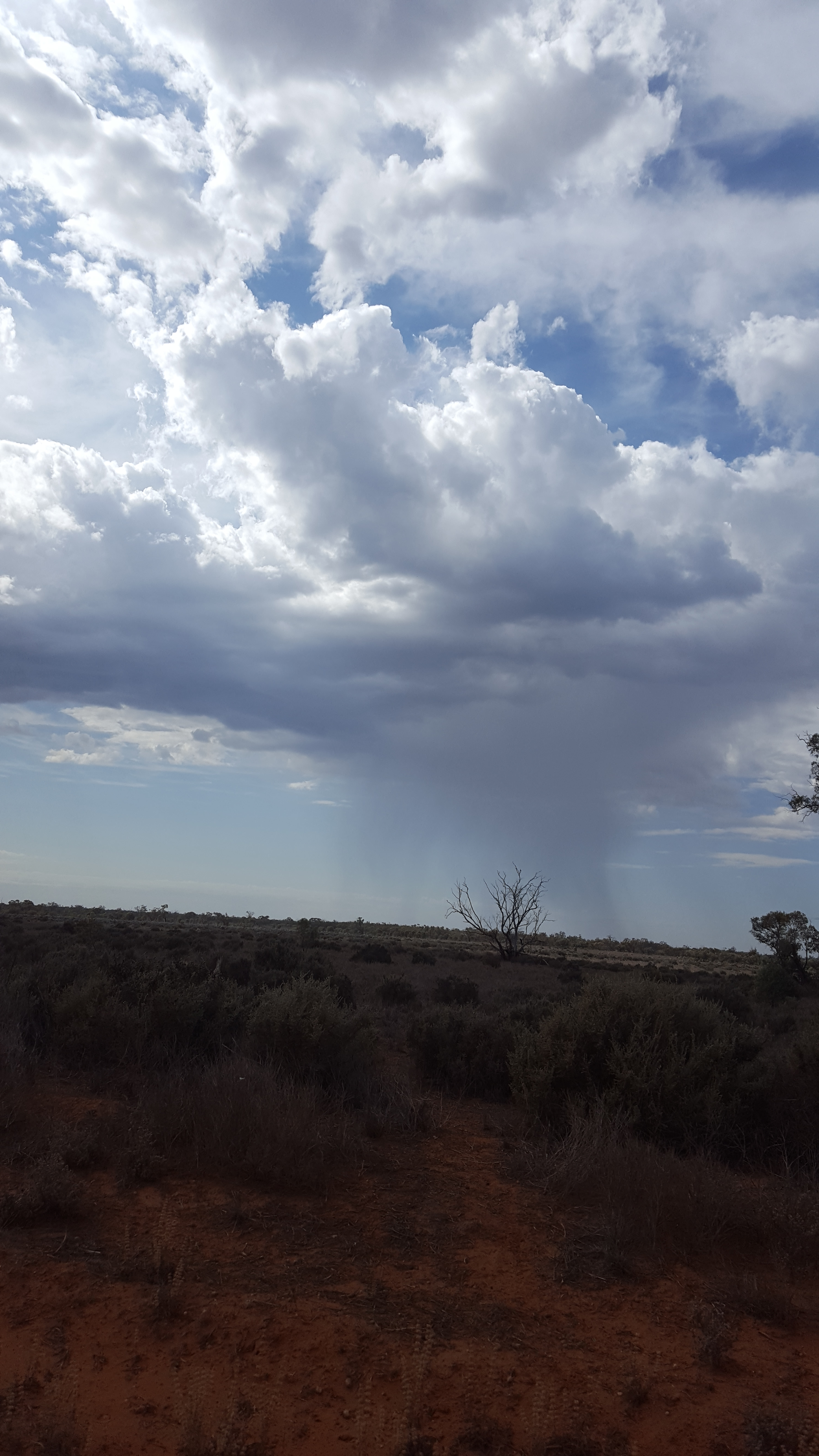
A Cumulonimbus Calvus over Lake Leaghur, Mungo, viewed from Lake Mungo at 4 Oct 2024. A rain shaft can be seen in the photo, falling down from the cloud.

Cumulonimbus calvus is categorized by size and development and lacks an anvil head found on Cumulonimbus capillatus or Cumulonimbus incus. While lightning is not required, it can be used to differentiate it from Cumulus congestus. Developing cumulonimbus calvus lose sharp outlines of the top as more water droplets transform into ice crystals. Strong updrafts may form pileus or thin vertical stripes may protrude upwards out of the cloud. When upper parts of the cloud freeze to a greater extent and clearly visible cirriforms appear, cumulonimbus calvus metamorphoses into another species of cumulonimbus.

== Hazards ==
Like other cumulonimbus clouds, cumulonimbus calvus can cause severe weather conditions including:

- Lightning; these clouds can produce lightning.
- Wind; these clouds may produce strong winds especially during a downburst
- Hail; these clouds can sometimes produce hail
- Landspout; Cumulonimbus calvus clouds can, on rare occasions, produce a unique type of tornado known as a landspout. Landspouts are formed when strong ground level rotation is caught in the updraft of the storm, pulling it upwards and connecting it to the clouds above resulting in the rotation becoming a true tornado.

The cumulonimbus calvus can further grow larger if the updraft is strong. It can form into a cumulonimbus incus, and bring more severe thunderstorms that can cause constant cloud-to-ground lightning, extensive wind damage, microbursts, hail, and occasionally a tornado.
