= Cumulonimbus velum =

Type of cumulus cloud

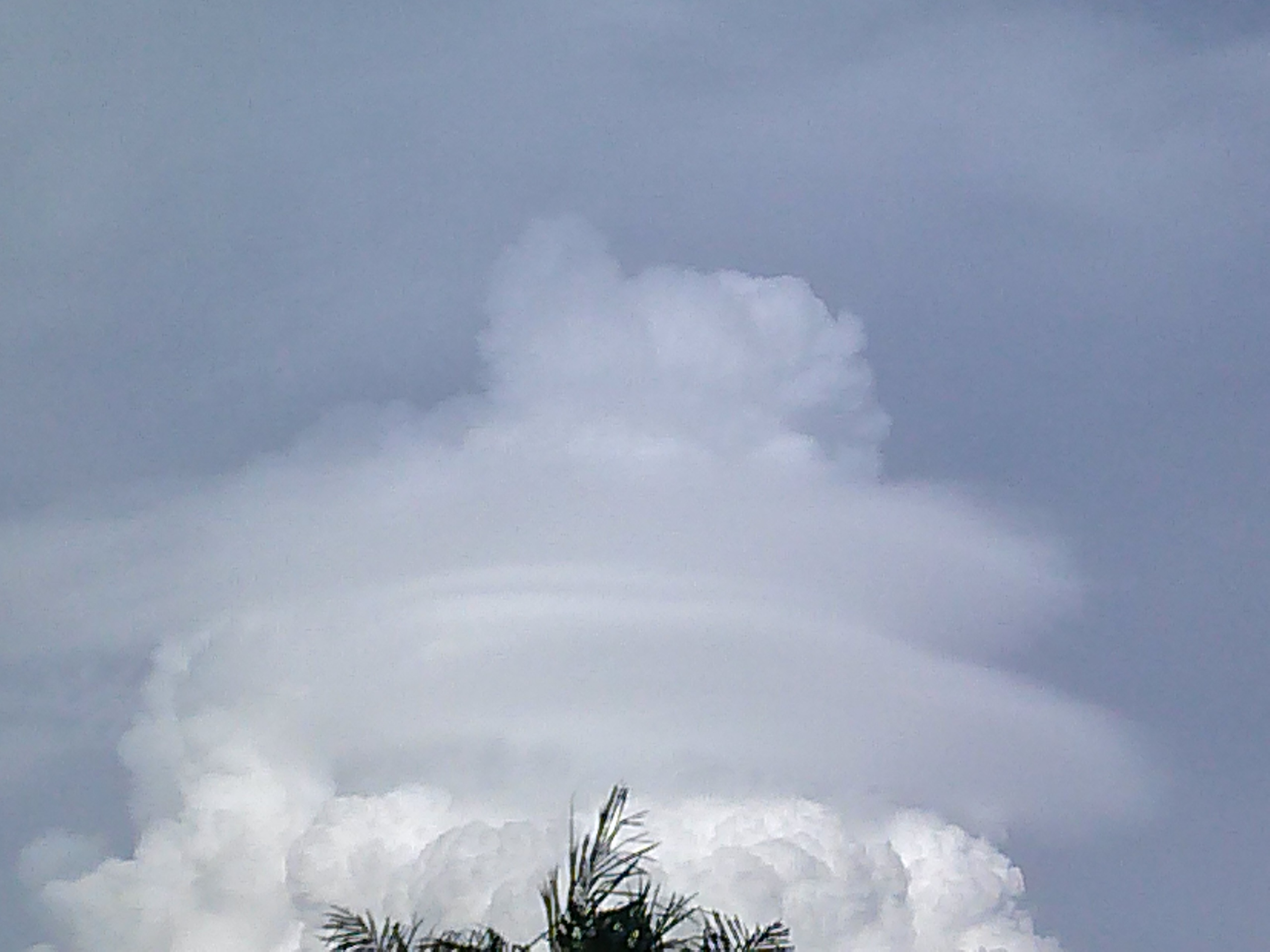
Velum near the top of a cumulonimbus

Cumulonimbus velum (Cb vel) (from the Latin cumulonimbus, "column-rain" + velum, "veil") is a cumulonimbus cloud with an accessory cloud veil wrapped around its mid area, representing an area of humid stable air created as a result of the growth of the parent cumulonimbus. The altostratus velum cloud appears dark in comparison to its parent cloud, and can persist even after the cumulonimbus has disintegrated. The velum is very rare, as conditions necessary in development are infrequent.
