= Mammatus cloud =

Supplementary feature of clouds

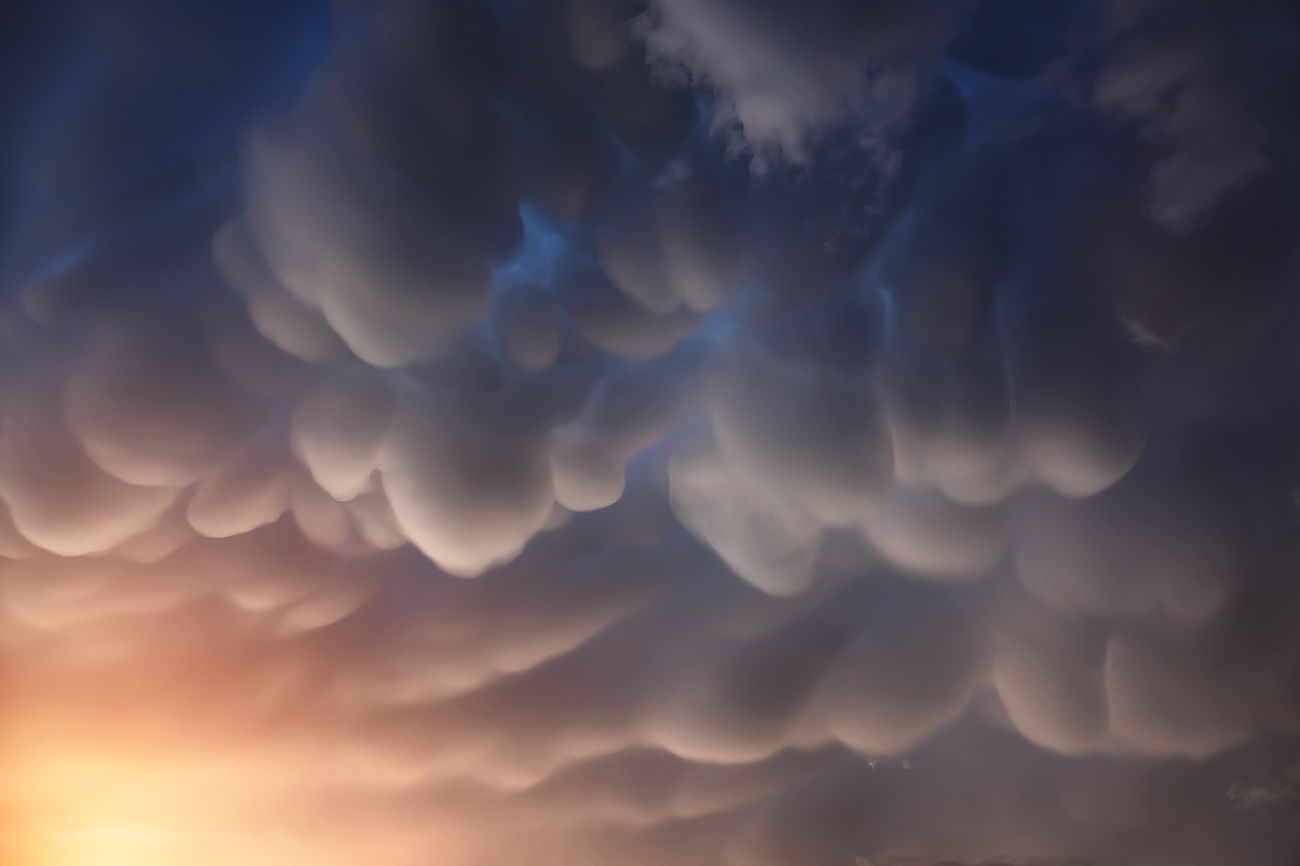
Mammatus clouds over the Nepal Himalayas

Mammatus (also called mamma or mammatocumulus, meaning "mammary cloud") is a cellular pattern of pouches hanging underneath the base of a cloud, typically a cumulonimbus raincloud, although they may be attached to other classes of parent clouds. The name mammatus is derived from the Latin mamma (meaning "udder" or "breast").

According to the WMO International Cloud Atlas, mamma is a cloud supplementary feature rather than a genus, species or variety of cloud. The distinct "lumpy" undersides form as cold air sinks, creating pockets that contrast with the rising puffs of clouds caused by the convection of warm air. These formations were first described in 1894 by William Clement Ley.

== Characteristics ==
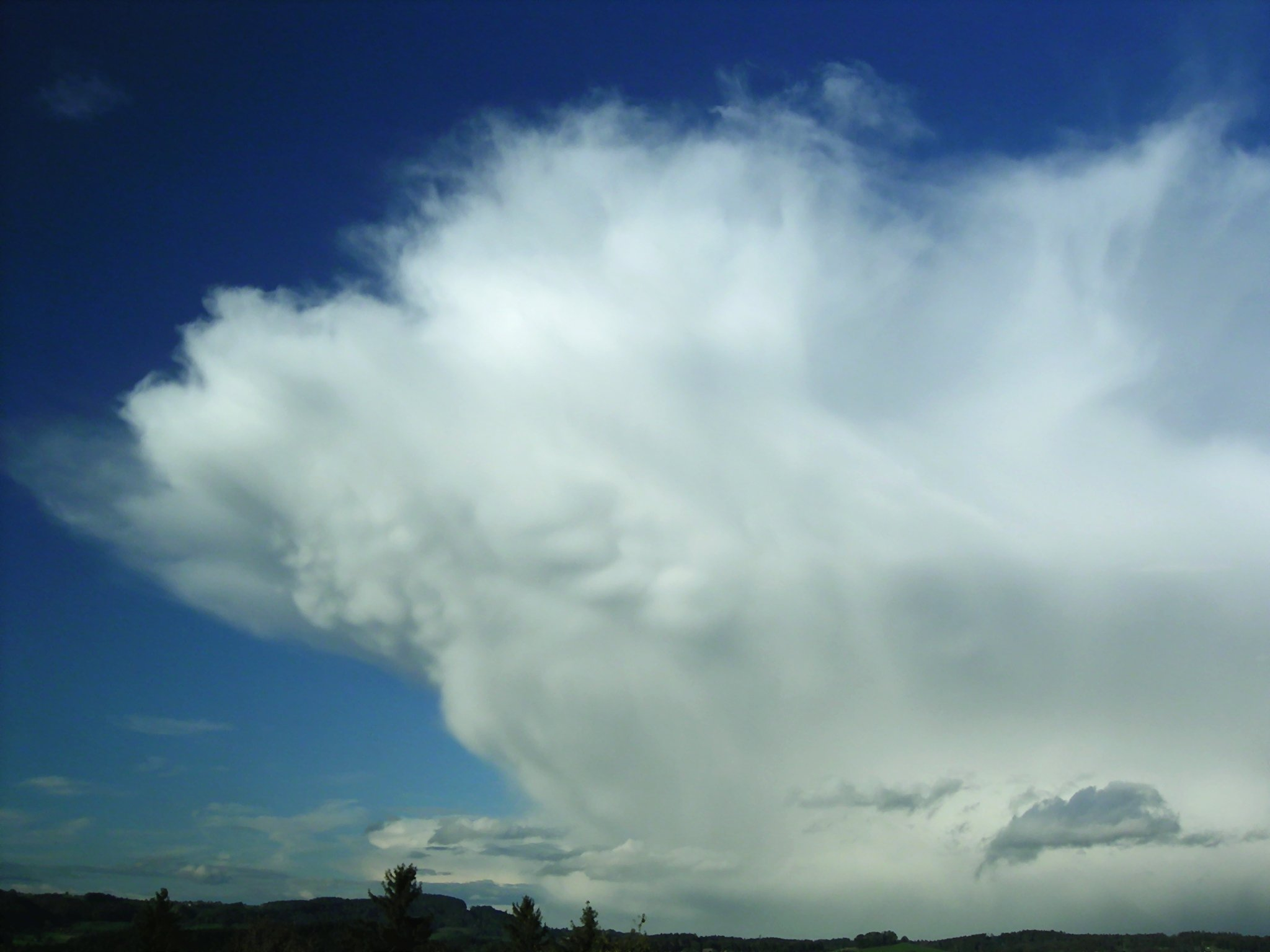
Mammatus clouds on a cumulonimbus capillatus

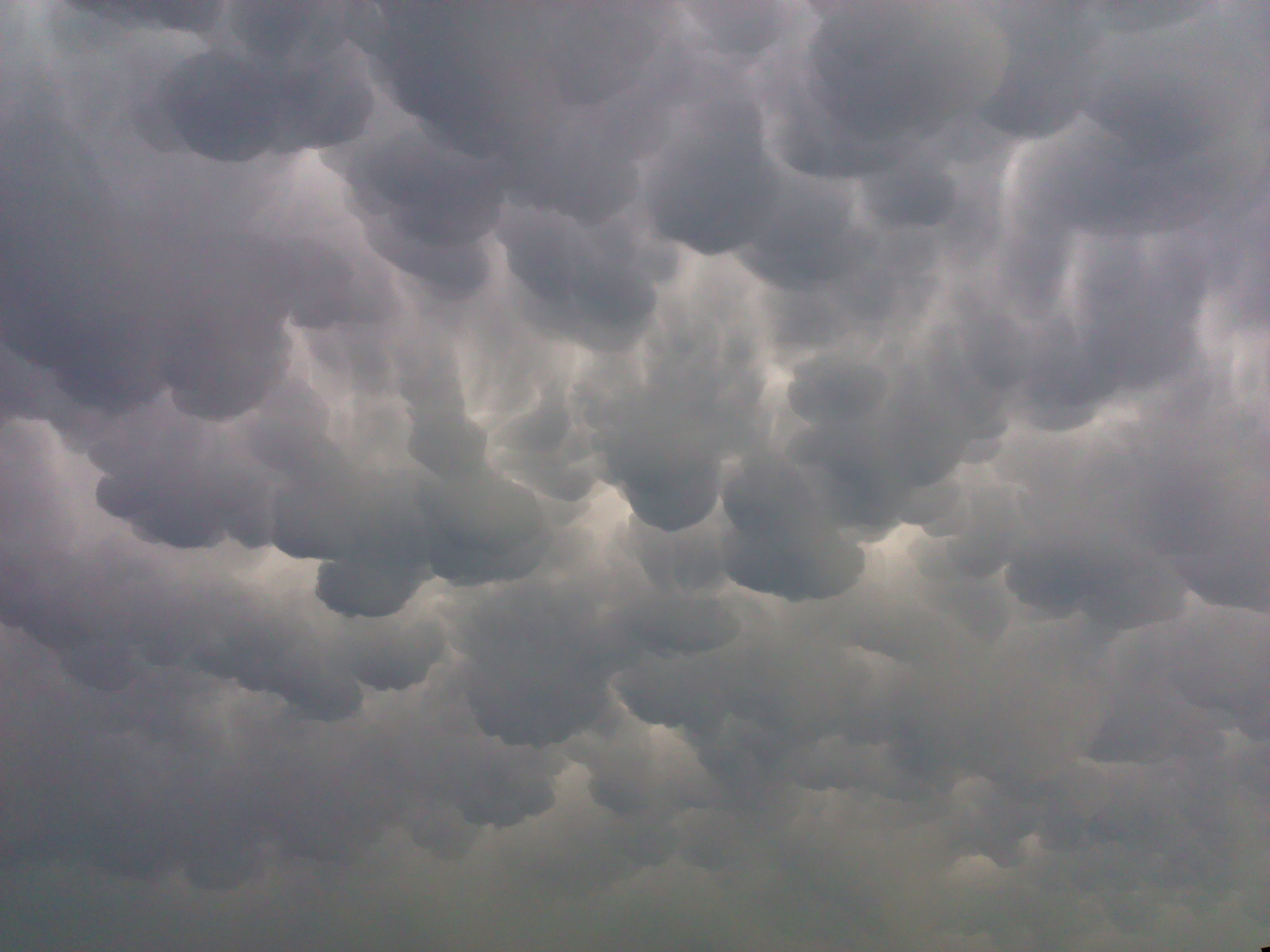
Mammatus seen over Joplin, Missouri, 40 minutes before an EF5 tornado struck the city.

Mammatus are most often associated with anvil clouds and also severe thunderstorms. They often extend from the base of a cumulonimbus cloud, but may also be found under altostratus, and cirrus clouds, as well as volcanic ash clouds. When occurring in cumulonimbus, mammatus are often indicative of a particularly strong storm. Due to the intensely sheared environment in which mammatus form, aviators are strongly cautioned to avoid cumulonimbus with mammatus as they indicate convectively induced turbulence. Contrails may also produce lobes but these are incorrectly termed as mammatus.

Mammatus may appear as smooth, ragged or lumpy lobes and may be opaque or translucent. Because mammatus occur as a grouping of lobes, the way they clump together can vary from an isolated cluster to a field of mammae that spread over hundreds of kilometers to being organized along a line, and may be composed of either unequal or similarly sized lobes. The individual mammatus lobe average diameters of 1–3 kilometres (0.6–1.9 mi) and lengths on average of 1/2 kilometre (0.3 mi). A lobe can last an average of 10 minutes, but a whole cluster of mamma can range from 15 minutes to a few hours. They are usually composed of ice, but also can be a mixture of ice and liquid water or be composed of almost entirely liquid water.

True to their ominous appearance, mammatus clouds are often harbingers of a coming storm or other extreme weather system. Typically composed primarily of ice, they can extend for hundreds of miles in each direction and individual formations can remain visibly static for ten to fifteen minutes at a time. They usually appear around, before, or even after severe weather.

== Hypothesized formation mechanisms ==
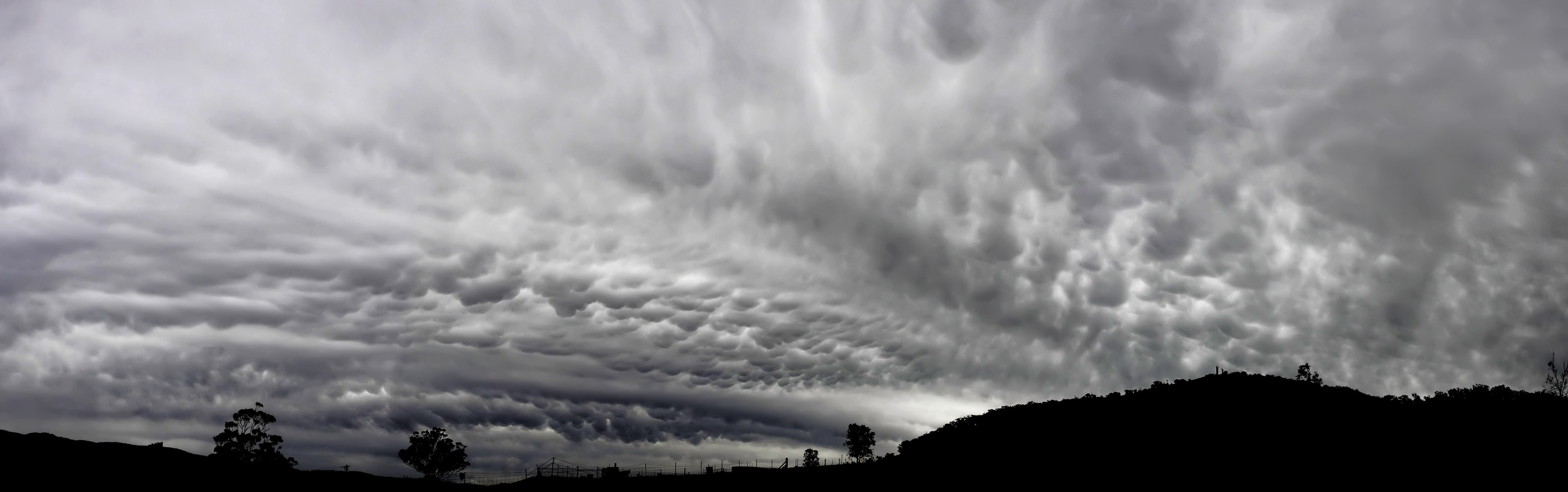
Panorama of mammatus cloud formations in Swifts Creek, Victoria

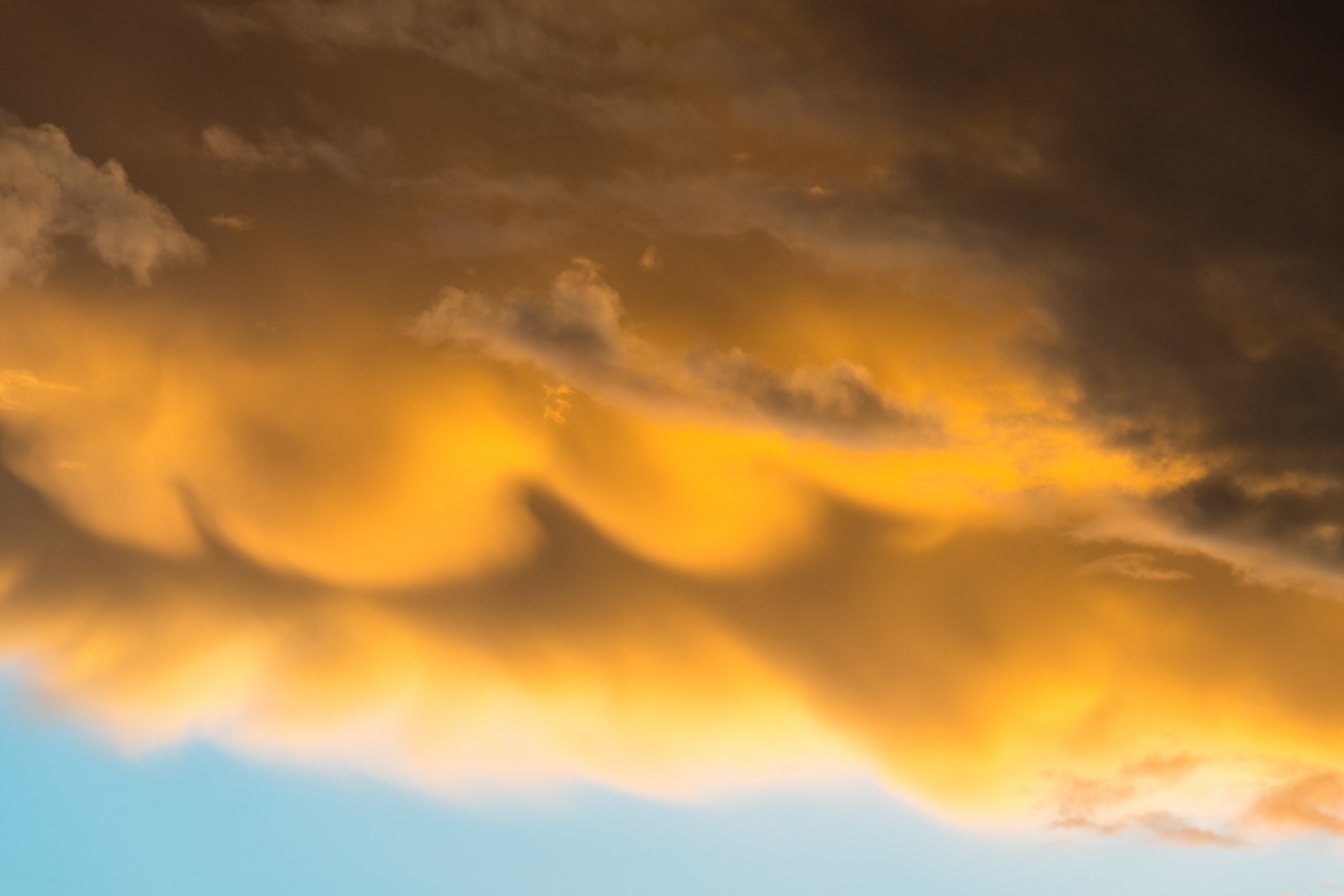
Mammatus cloud formation lit by sunset in Visakhapatnam, India

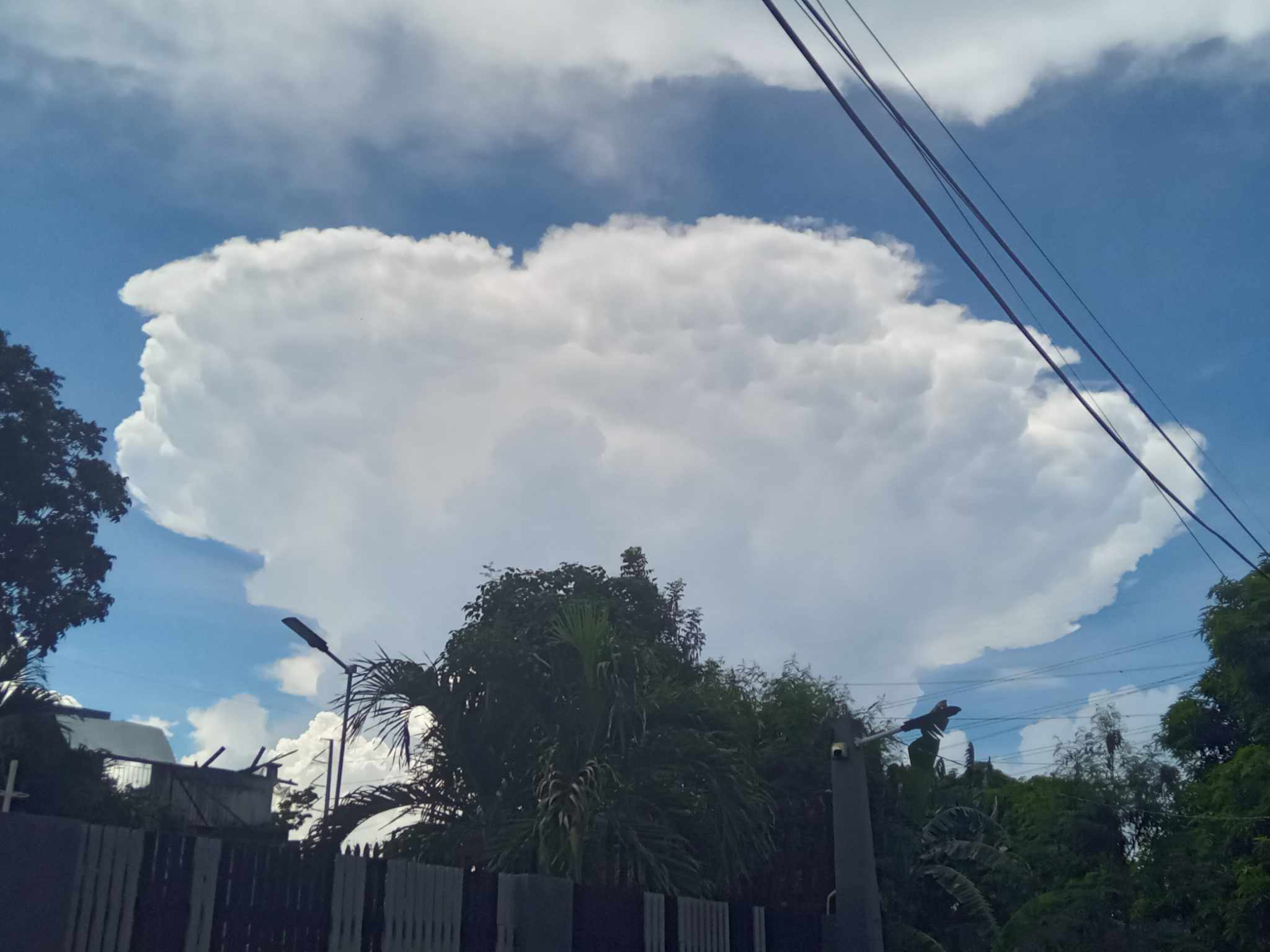
Several pouches of mammatus clouds seen under cumulonimbus incus in Biñan, Laguna, Philippines

The existence of many different types of mammatus clouds, each with distinct properties and occurring in distinct environments, has given rise to multiple hypotheses on their formation, which are also relevant to other cloud forms.

One environmental trend is shared by all of the formation mechanisms hypothesized for mammatus clouds: sharp gradients in temperature, moisture and momentum (wind shear) across the anvil cloud/sub-cloud air boundary, which strongly influence interactions therein. The following are the proposed mechanisms, each described with its shortcomings:

- The anvil of a cumulonimbus cloud gradually subsides as it spreads out from its source cloud. As air descends, it warms. However, the cloudy air will warm more slowly (at the moist adiabatic lapse rate) than the sub-cloud, dry air (at the dry adiabatic lapse rate). Because of the differential warming, the cloud/sub-cloud layer destabilizes and convective overturning can occur, creating a lumpy cloud-base. The problems with this theory are that there are observations of mammatus lobes that do not support the presence of strong subsidence in the lobes, and that it is difficult to separate the processes of hydrometeor fallout and cloud-base subsidence, thus rendering it unclear as to whether either process is occurring.
- Cooling due to hydrometeor fallout is a second proposed formation mechanism. As hydrometeors fall into the dry sub-cloud air, the air containing the precipitation cools due to evaporation or sublimation. Being now cooler than the environmental air and unstable, they descend until in static equilibrium, at which point a restoring force curves the edges of the fallout back up, creating the lobed appearance. One problem with this theory is that observations show that cloud-base evaporation does not always produce mammatus. This mechanism could be responsible for the earliest stage of development, but other processes (namely process 1, above) may come into play as the lobes are formed and mature.
- There may also be destabilization at cloud base due to melting. If the cloud base exists near the freezing line, then the cooling in the immediate air caused by melting can lead to convective overturning, just as in the processes above. However, this strict temperature environment is not always present.
- The above processes specifically relies on the destabilization of the sub-cloud layer due to adiabatic or latent heating effects. Discounting the thermodynamical effects of hydrometeor fallout, another mechanism proposes that dynamics of the fallout alone are enough to create the lobes. Inhomogeneities in the masses of the hydrometeors along the cloud-base may cause inhomogeneous descent along the base. Frictional drag and associated eddy-like structures create the lobed appearance of the fallout. The main shortcoming of this theory is that vertical velocities in the lobes have been observed to be greater than the fall speeds of the hydrometeors within them; thus, there should be a dynamical downward forcing, as well.
- Another method, that was first proposed by Kerry Emanuel, is called cloud-base detrainment instability (CDI), which acts very much like convective cloud-top entrainment. In CDI, cloudy air is mixed into the dry sub-cloud air rather than precipitating into it. The cloudy layer destabilizes due to evaporative cooling and mammatus are formed.
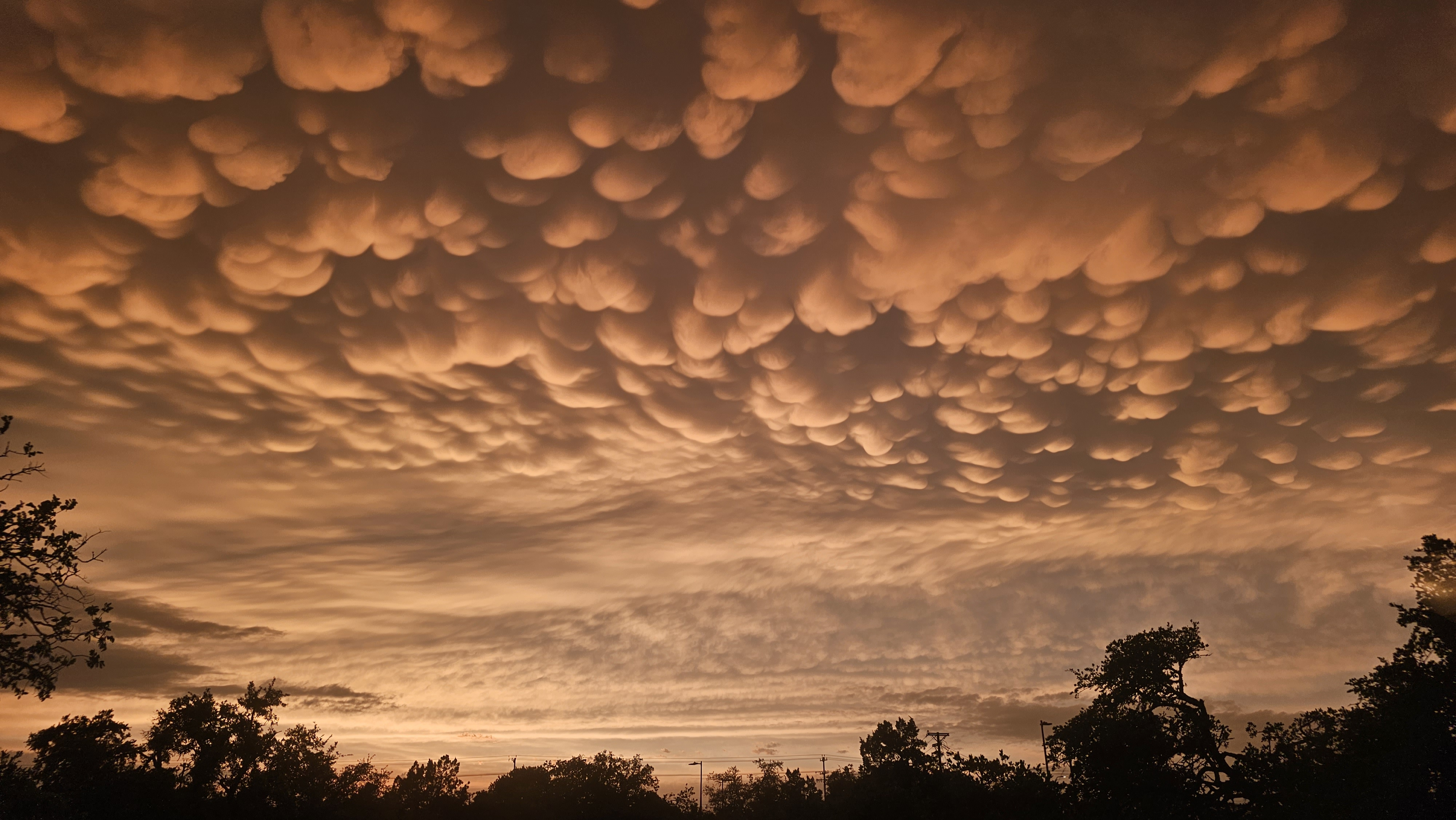
- A classic view of mammatus clouds from Austin, TX
  Clouds undergo thermal reorganization due to radiative effects as they evolve. There are a couple of ideas as to how radiation can cause mammatus to form. One is that, because clouds radiatively cool (Stefan–Boltzmann law) very efficiently at their tops, entire pockets of cool, negatively buoyant cloud can penetrate downward through the entire layer and emerge as mammatus at cloud-base. Another idea is that as the cloud-base warms due to radiative heating from land surface's longwave emission, the base destabilizes and overturns. This method is valid for only optically thick clouds. However, the nature of anvil clouds is that they are largely made up of ice, and are therefore relatively optically thin.
- Gravity waves are proposed to be the formation mechanism of linearly organized mammatus clouds. Indeed, wave patterns have been observed in the mammatus environment, but this is mostly due to gravity wave creation as a response to a convective updraft impinging upon the tropopause and spreading out in wave form over the entirety of the anvil. Therefore, this method does not explain the prevalence of mammatus clouds in one part of the anvil versus another. Furthermore, time and size scales for gravity waves and mammatus do not match up entirely. Gravity wave trains may be responsible for organizing the mammatus rather than forming them.
- Kelvin–Helmholtz (K–H) instability is prevalent along cloud boundaries and results in the formation of wave-like protrusions (called Kelvin-Helmholtz billows) from a cloud boundary. Mammatus are not in the form of K-H billows, thus, it is proposed that the instability can trigger the formation of the protrusions, but that another process must form the protrusions into lobes. Still, the main downfall with this theory is that K-H instability occurs in a stably stratified environment, and the mammatus environment is usually at least somewhat turbulent.
- Rayleigh–Taylor instability is the name given to the instability that exists between two fluids of differing densities, when the denser of the two is atop the less dense fluid. Along a cloud-base/sub-cloud interface, the denser, hydrometeor-laden air could cause mixing with the less-dense sub-cloud air. This mixing would take the form of mammatus clouds. The physical problem with this proposed method is that an instability existing along a static interface cannot necessarily be applied to the interface between two sheared atmospheric flows.
- The last proposed formation mechanism is that mammatus arise from Rayleigh–Bénard convection, where differential heating (cooling at the top and heating at the bottom) of a layer causes convective overturning. However, in this case of mammatus, the base is cooled by thermodynamical mechanisms mentioned above. As the cloud base descends, it happens on the scale of mammatus lobes, while adjacent to the lobes, there is a compensating ascent. This method has not proven to be observationally sound and is viewed as generally insubstantial.

This plenitude of proposed formation mechanisms shows, if nothing else, that the mammatus cloud is generally poorly understood.
