= Cumulonimbus capillatus =

Hazardous cloud

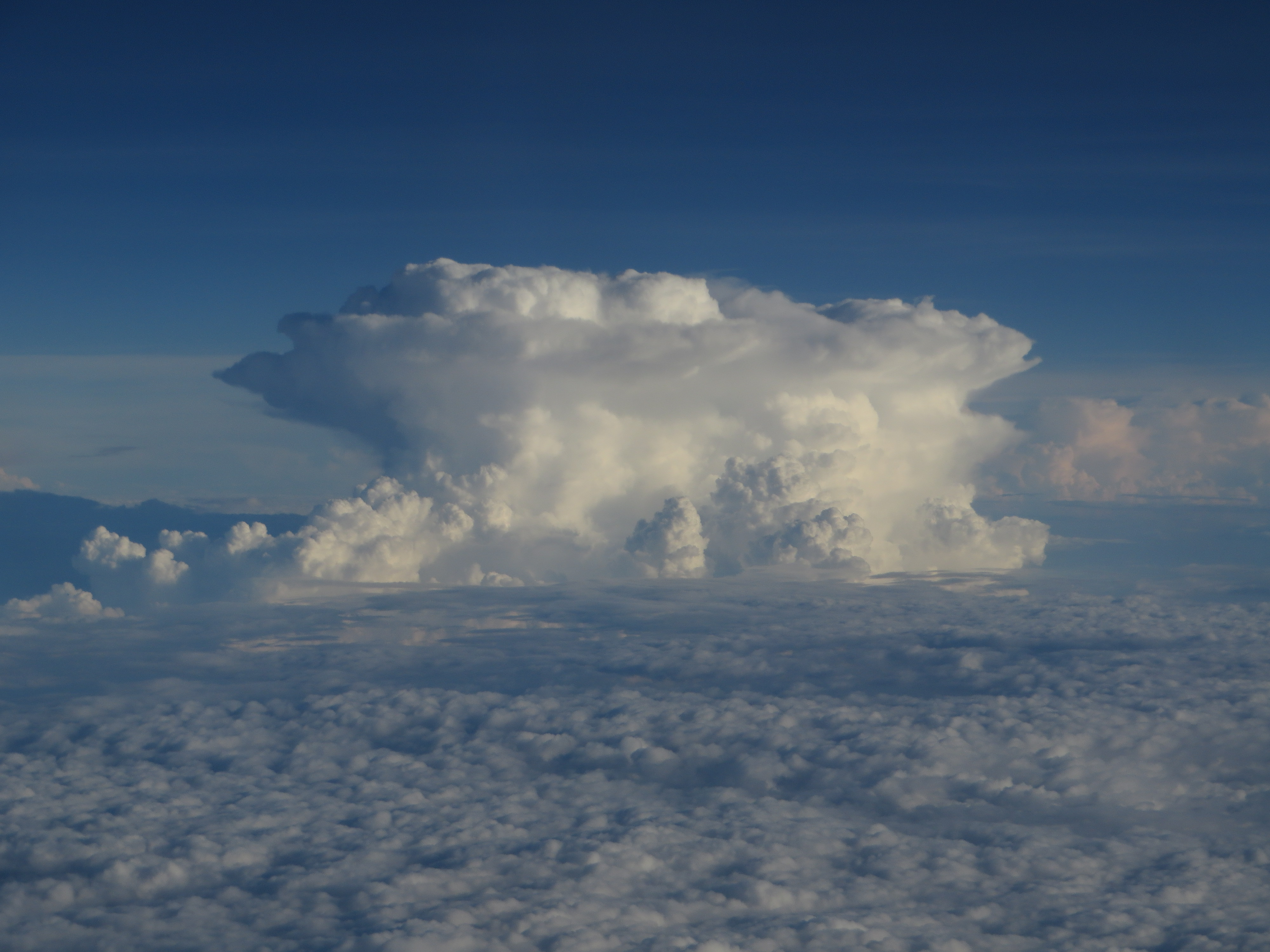
- Abbreviation: Cb cap.
- Altitude: Ground to 23,000 m (75,000 ft)
- Appearance: Dark-based storm cloud capable of impressive vertical growth, with a fibrous upper portion
- Precipitation: Very often rain, snow, snow pellets, or hail; heavy at times

A cumulonimbus capillatus is a cumulonimbus cloud with dense cirrus clouds above it, making the cloud top appear to contain hair-like structures. It is an intermediate stage between cumulonimbus calvus and cumulonimbus incus.

== Etymology ==
The name comes from the Latin word capillatus, meaning "with hair".

== Hazards ==
A cumulonimbus capillatus is a mature and powerful cumulonimbus cloud and can produce multiple severe weather.

- Lightning: this is a strong thunderstorm cloud and it is capable of producing bursts of cloud to ground and cloud to cloud lightning.
- Hail: hailstones may fall from this cloud if it is in a highly unstable environment (which favors a more vigorous storm updraft).
- Heavy rain: the cloud may drop several inches of rain in a short amount of time. This can cause flash flooding.
- Strong wind: gale-force winds from a downburst may occur under this cloud.
- Weak to strong tornados can occur.
