= Cumulonimbus cloud =

Genus of dense, towering vertical clouds

Cumulonimbus
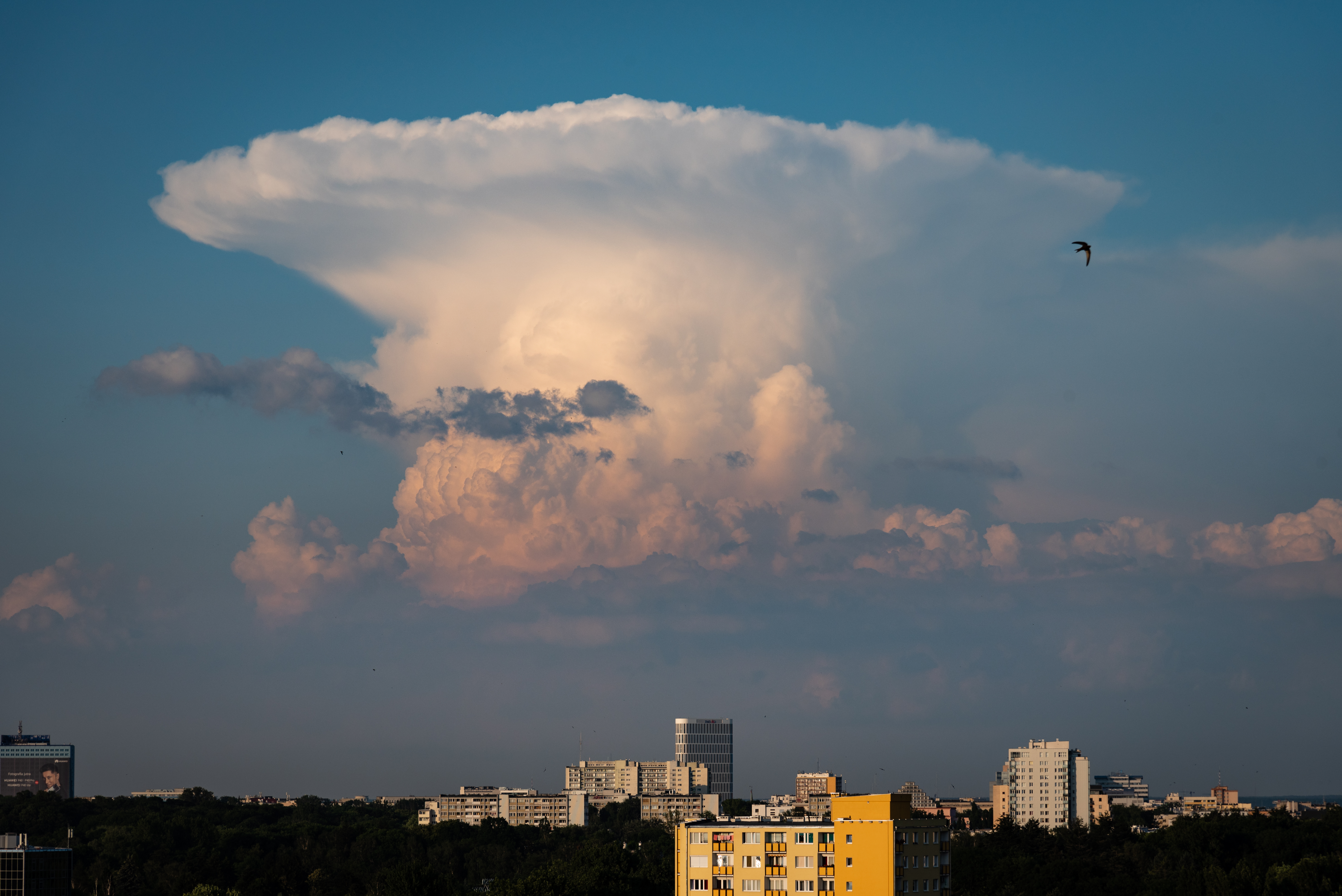
- Cumulonimbus incus over Warsaw, Poland
- Abbreviation: Cb.
- Genus: Cumulonimbus (heap, rain)
- Species: Calvus; Capillatus
- Variety: None
- Altitude: 500–16,000 m (2,000–52,000 ft)
- Classification: Family D (Vertically developed)
- Appearance: Dark-based storm cloud capable of impressive vertical growth.
- Precipitation: Very common rain, snow, snow pellets, or hail, heavy at times

Cumulonimbus (from Latin cumulus 'heap' and nimbus 'rain cloud') is a dense, towering, vertical cloud types, typically forming from water vapor condensing in the lower troposphere that builds upward carried by powerful buoyant air currents. Above the lower portions of the cumulonimbus the water vapor becomes ice crystals, such as snow and graupel, the interaction of which can lead to hail and to lightning formation, respectively.

When causing thunderstorms, these clouds may be called thunderheads. Cumulonimbus can form alone, in clusters, or along squall lines. These clouds are capable of producing lightning and other dangerous severe weather, such as tornadoes, hazardous winds, and large hailstones. Cumulonimbus progress from overdeveloped cumulus congestus clouds and may further develop as part of a supercell. Cumulonimbus is abbreviated as Cb.

== Description ==
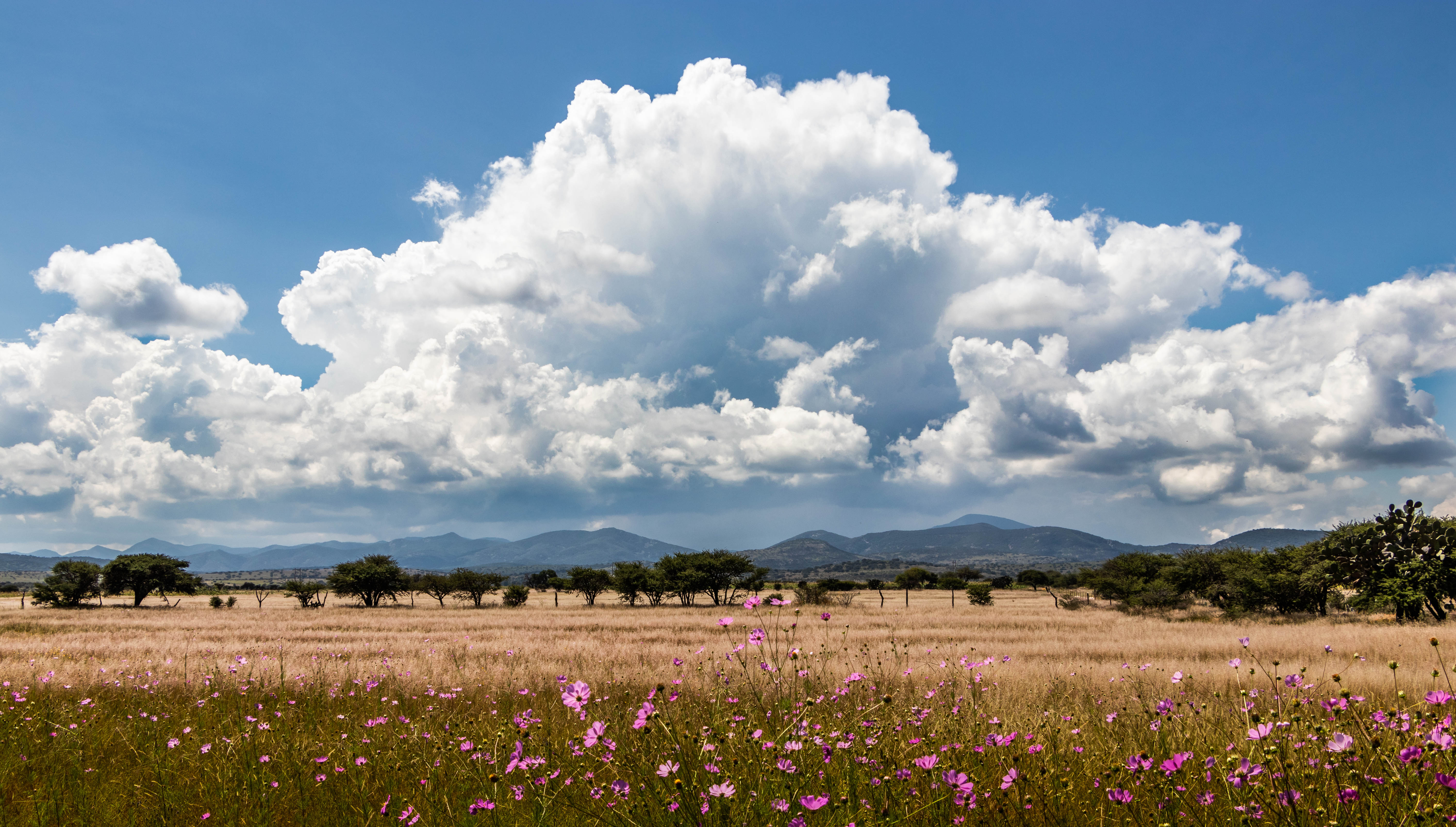
A cumulonimbus calvus over El Bajío, Guanajuato, Mexico.

Towering cumulonimbus clouds are typically accompanied by smaller cumulus clouds. The cumulonimbus base may extend several kilometres (miles) across, or be as small as several tens of metres (yards) across, and occupy low to upper altitudes within the troposphere - formed at altitude from approximately 200 to 4,000 m (700 to 10,000 ft). Normal peaks usually reach to as much as 12,000 m (39,000 ft), with unusually high ones typically topping out around 20,000 m (66,000 ft) and extreme instances claimed to be as high as 21,000 m (69,000 ft) or more. The average cumulonimbus cloud weighs 500,000 kilograms (1.1 million pounds).

Well-developed cumulonimbus clouds are characterized by a flat, anvil shaped top (anvil dome), caused by wind shear or inversion at the equilibrium level near the tropopause. The shelf of the anvil may precede the main cloud's vertical component for many kilometres (miles), and be accompanied by lightning. Occasionally, rising air parcels surpass the equilibrium level (due to momentum) and form an overshooting top culminating at the maximum parcel level. When vertically developed, this largest of all clouds usually extends through all three cloud regions. Even the smallest cumulonimbus cloud dwarfs its neighbors in comparison.

=== Subtypes ===
==== Species ====
- Cumulonimbus calvus: cloud with puffy top, similar to cumulus congestus which it develops from; under the correct conditions it can become a cumulonimbus capillatus.
- Cumulonimbus capillatus: cloud with cirrus-like, fibrous-edged top.
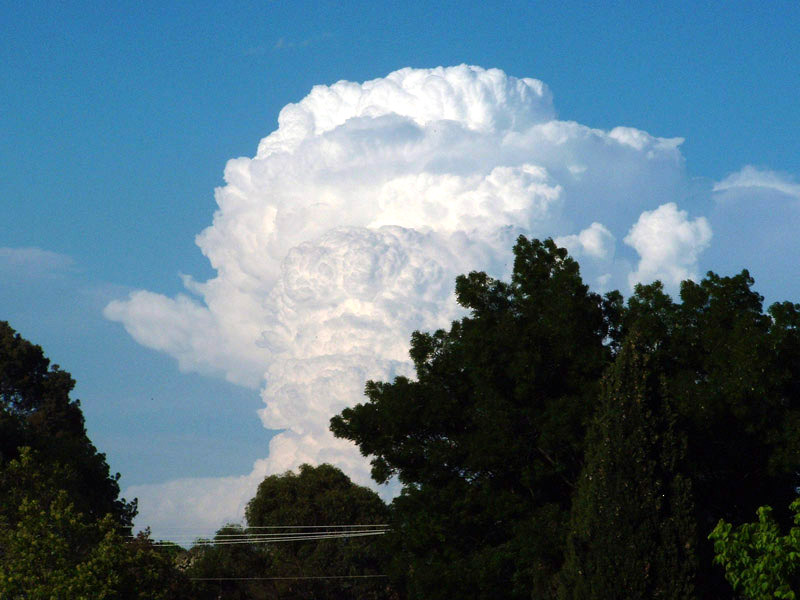
Cumulonimbus calvus

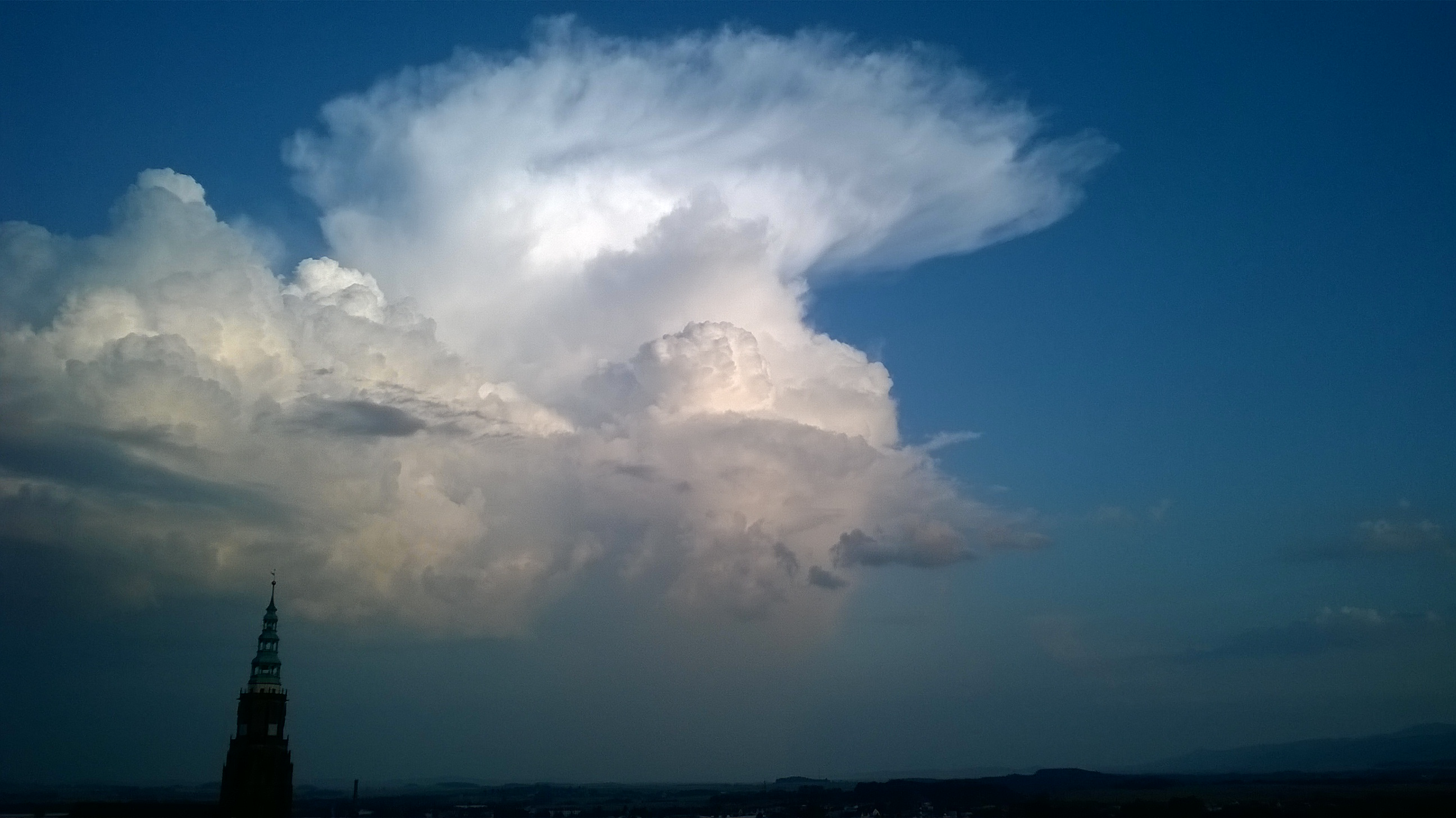
A clearly developed cumulonimbus fibrous-edged top capillatus

==== Types ====
- Cumulonimbus flammagenitus (pyrocumulonimbus): rapidly growing cloud forming from non-atmospheric heat and condensation nuclei sources such as wildfires and volcanic eruptions.

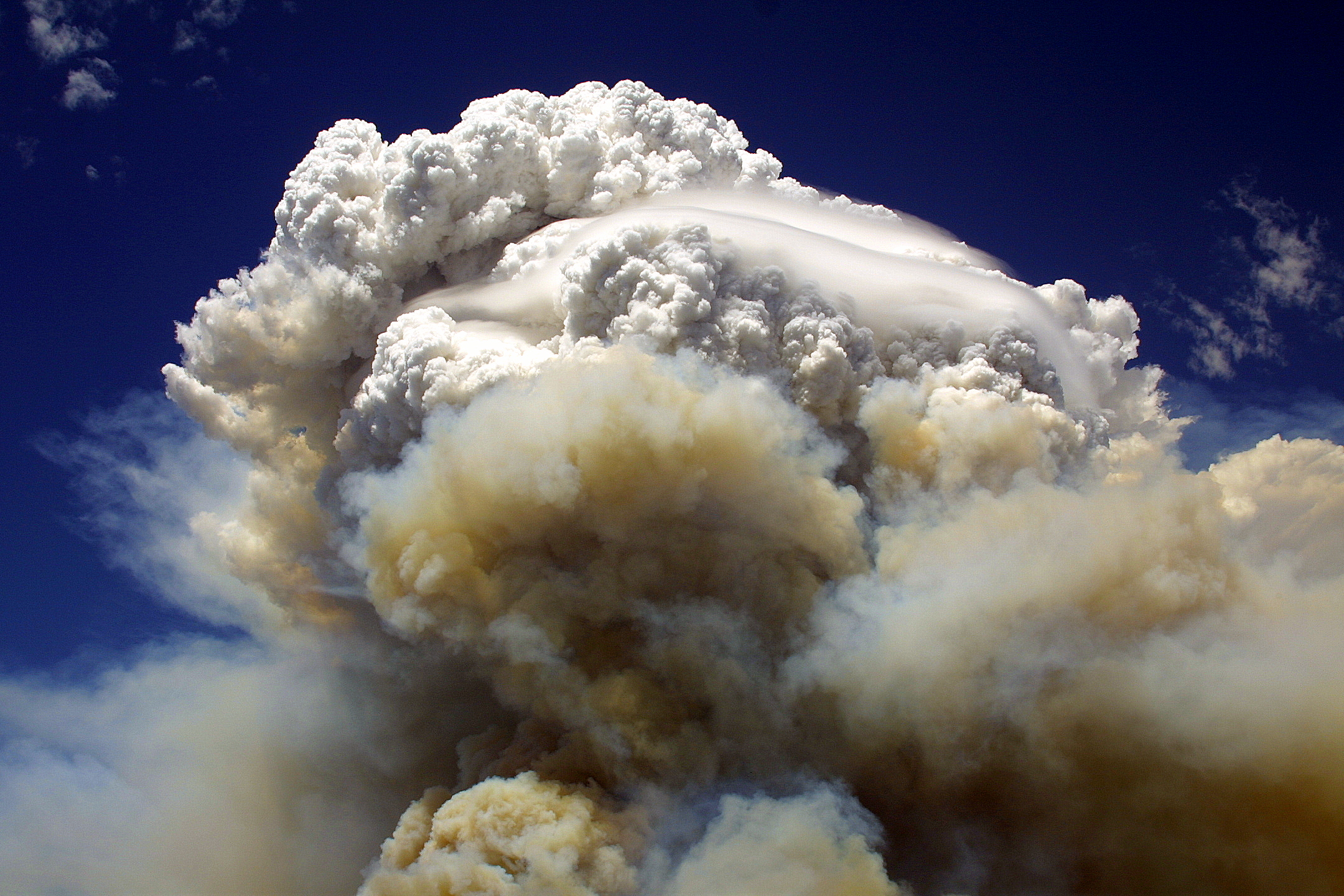
Pyrocumulonimbus with pileus

==== Supplementary features ====
===== Accessory clouds =====
- Arcus (including roll and shelf clouds): low, horizontal cloud formation associated with the leading edge of thunderstorm outflow.
- Pannus: accompanied by a lower layer of fractus species cloud forming in precipitation.
- Pileus (species calvus only): small cap-like cloud over parent cumulonimbus.
- Velum: a thin horizontal sheet that forms around the middle of a cumulonimbus.

===== Supplementary features =====
- Incus (species capillatus only): cumulonimbus with flat anvil-like cirriform top caused by wind shear where the rising air currents hit the inversion layer at the tropopause.
- Mamma or mammatus: consisting of bubble-like protrusions on the underside.
- Tuba: column hanging from the cloud base which can develop into a funnel cloud or tornado. They are known to drop very low, sometimes just 6 metres (20 ft) above ground level.
- Flanking line is a line of small cumulonimbus or cumulus generally associated with severe thunderstorms.
- An overshooting top is a dome that rises above the thunderstorm; it is associated with severe weather.

===== Precipitation-based supplementary features =====
- Rain: precipitation that reaches the ground as liquid, often in a precipitation shaft.
- Virga: precipitation that evaporates before reaching the ground.
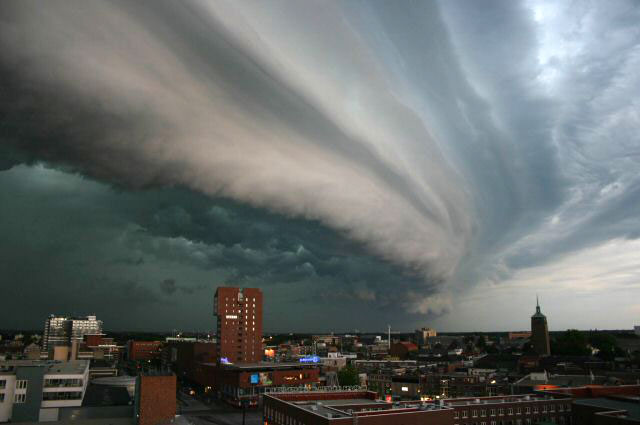
Arcus cloud (shelf cloud) leading a thunderstorm

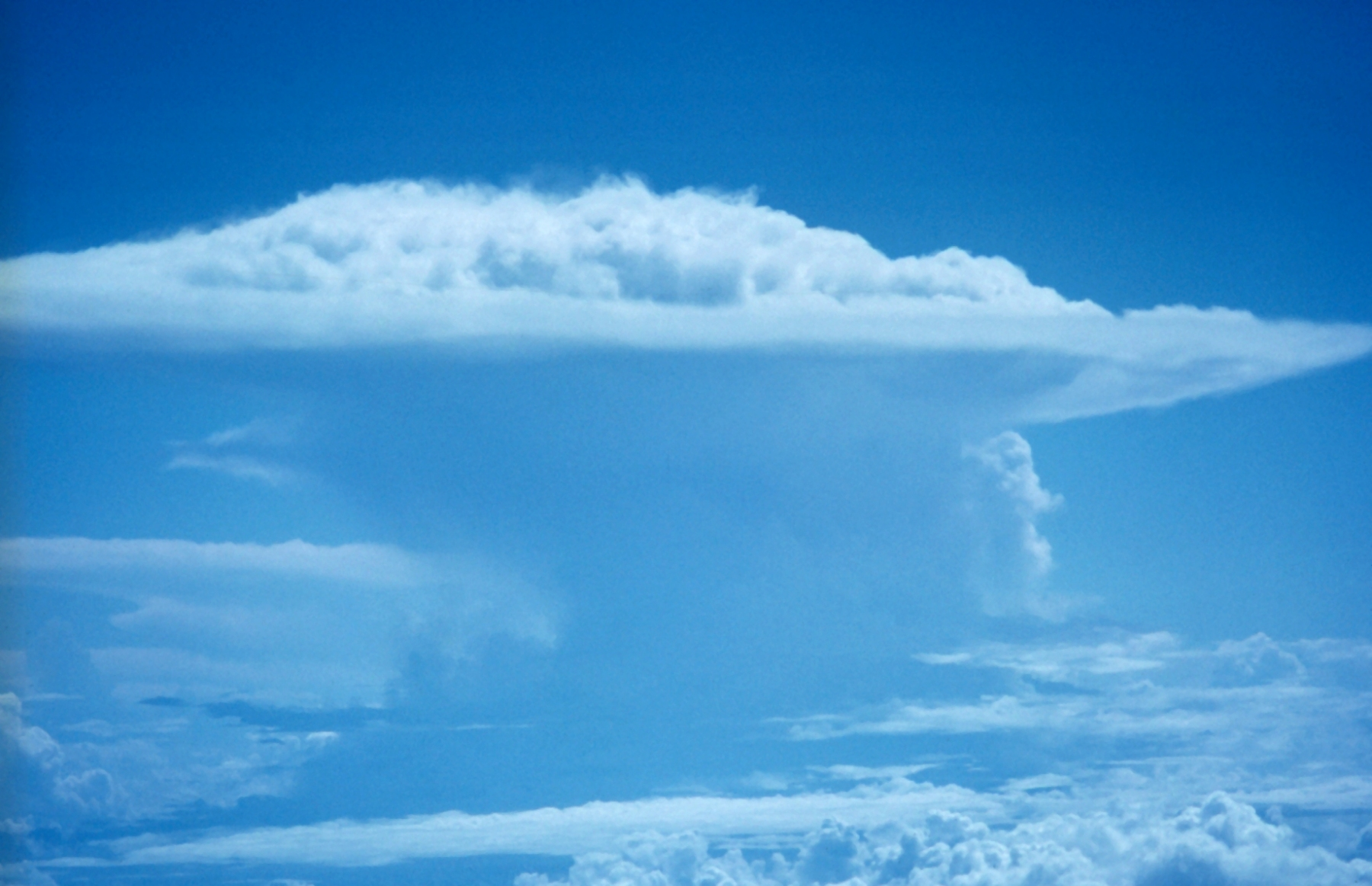
Incus with a velum edge

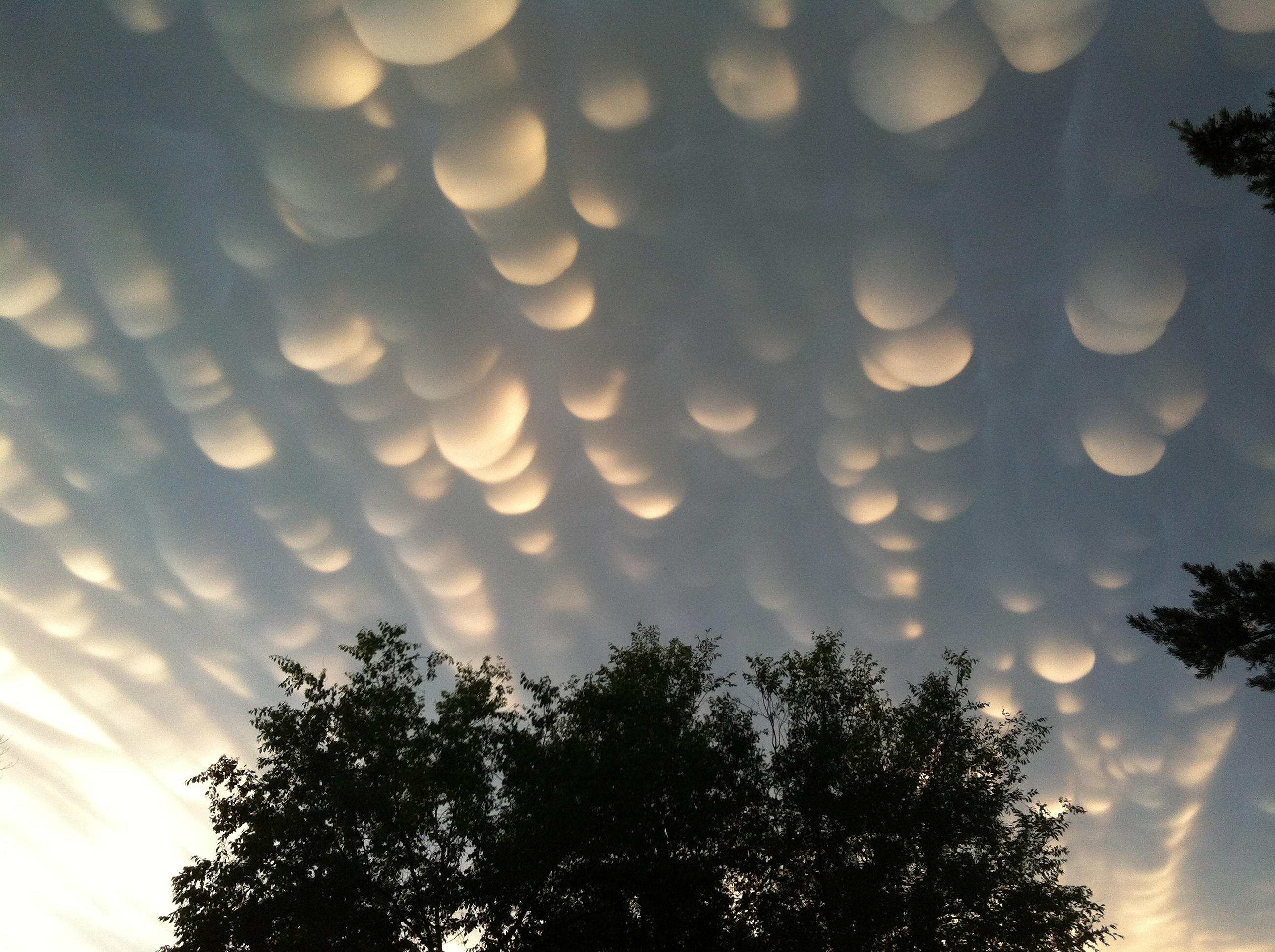
Mammatocumulus with drooping pouches

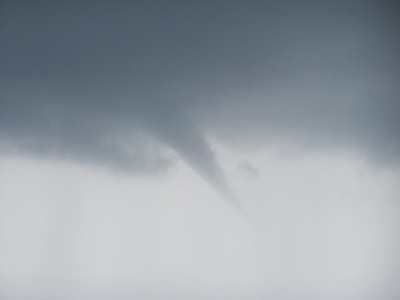
A funnel cloud (tuba) over the Netherlands

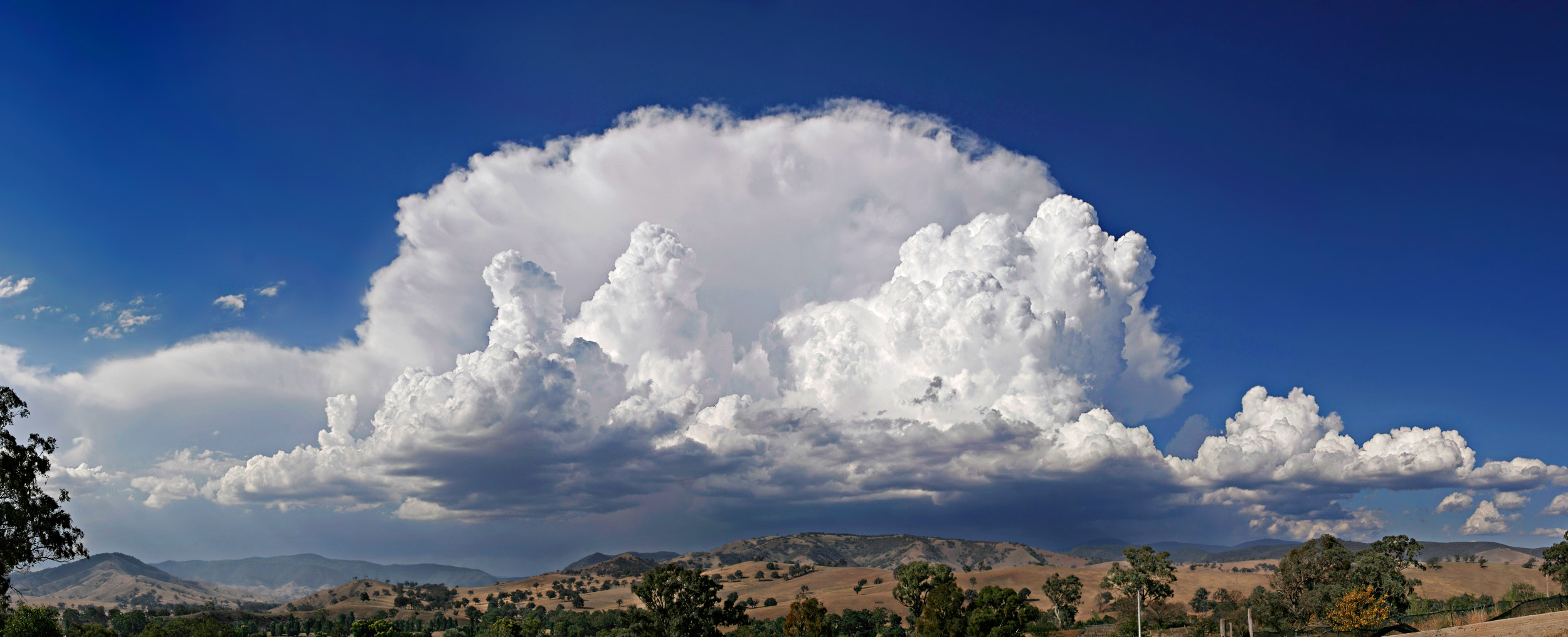
Flanking line in front of a strong thunderstorm

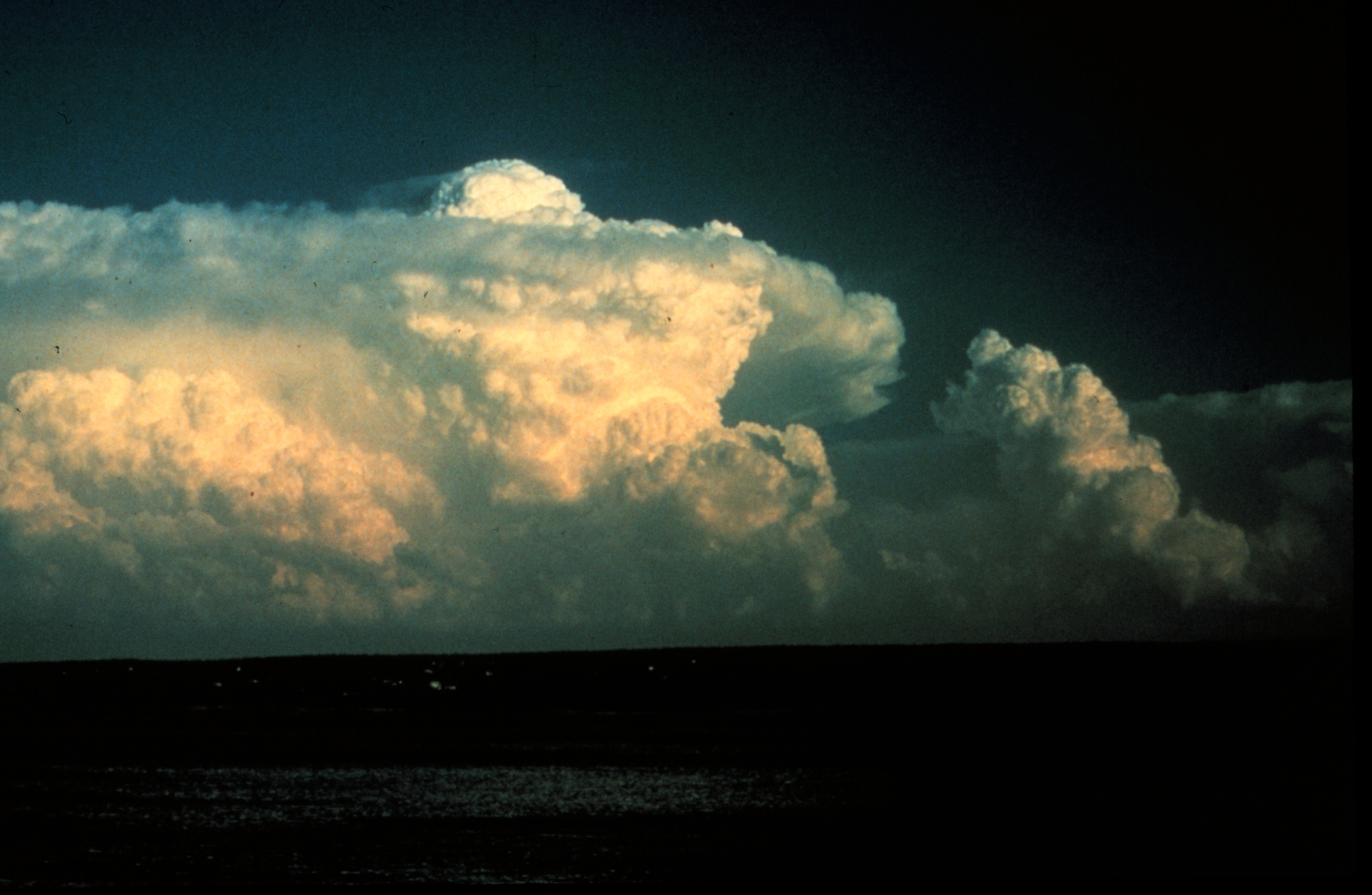
An overshooting top is a dome of clouds atop a cumulonimbus

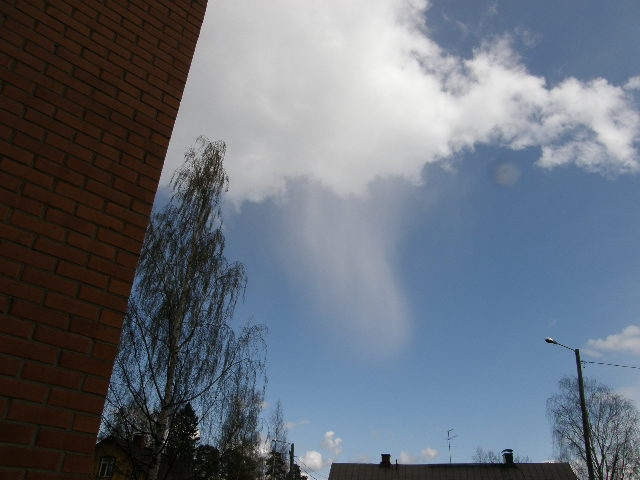
Rain evaporating before reaching the ground (virga)

== Effects ==
Cumulonimbus storm cells can produce torrential rain of a convective nature (often in the form of a rain shaft) and flash flooding, as well as straight-line winds. Most storm cells die after about 20 minutes, when the precipitation causes more downdraft than updraft, causing the energy to dissipate. If there is sufficient instability and moisture in the atmosphere, however (on a hot summer day, for example), the outflowing moisture and gusts from one storm cell can lead to new cells forming just a few kilometres (miles) from the former one a few tens of minutes later or in some cases hundreds of kilometres (miles) away many hours later. This process cause thunderstorm formation (and decay) to last for several hours or even over multiple days. Cumulonimbus clouds can also occur as dangerous winter storms called "thundersnow" which are associated with particularly intense snowfall rates and with blizzard conditions when accompanied by strong winds that further reduce visibility. However, cumulonimbus clouds are most common in tropical regions and are also frequent in moist environments during the warm season in the middle latitudes. A dust storm caused by a cumulonimbus downburst is a haboob.

=== Aviation ===
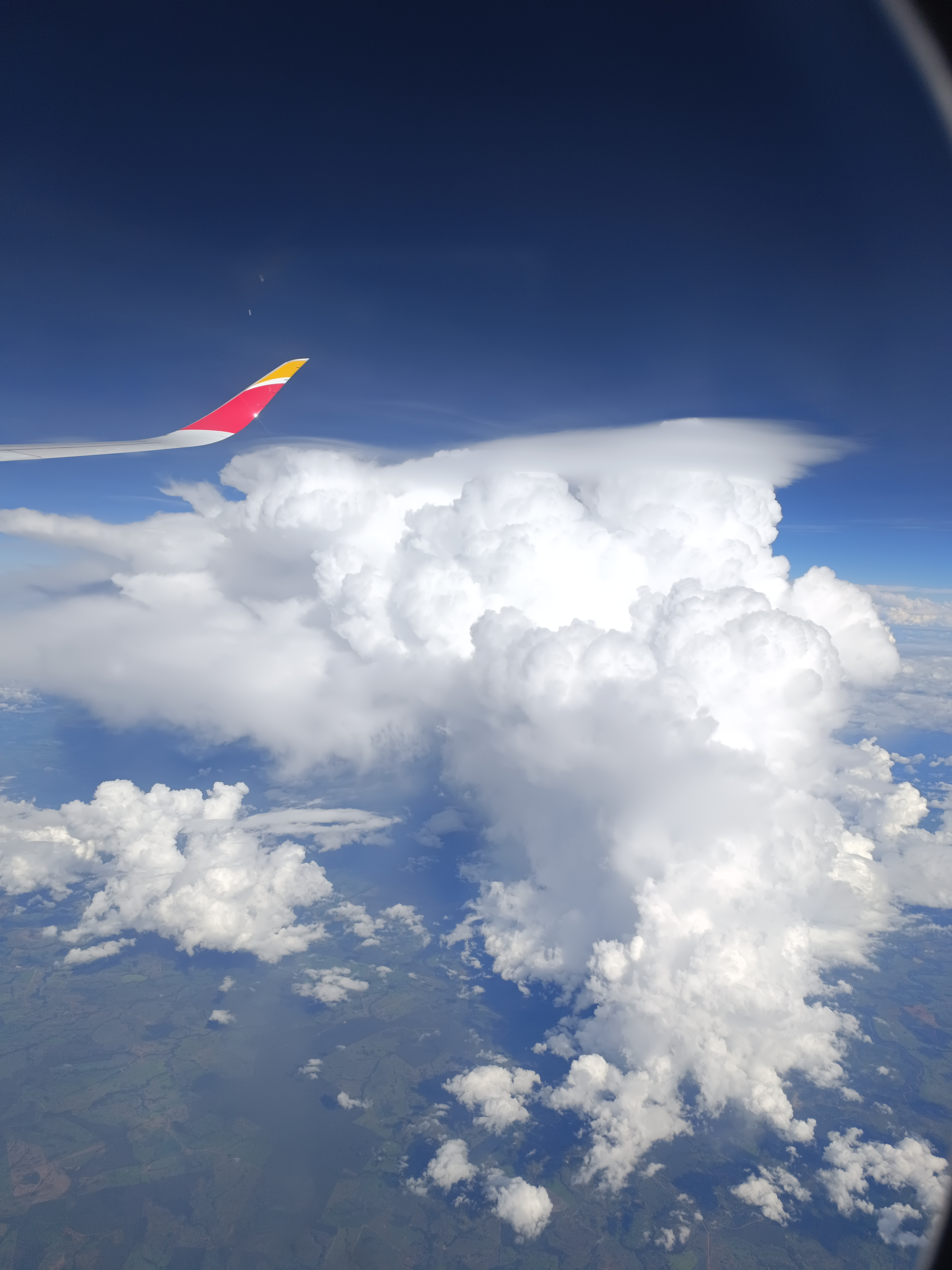
Aerial view of a cumulonimbus with pileus, flying over Brazil

Cumulonimbus are a notable hazard to aviation mostly due to potent wind currents but also reduced visibility and lightning, as well as atmospheric icing and hail if flying inside the cloud. Within and in the vicinity of thunderstorms there is significant turbulence and clear-air turbulence (particularly downwind), respectively. Wind shear within and under a cumulonimbus is often intense with downbursts being responsible for many accidents in earlier decades before training and technological detection and nowcasting measures were implemented. A small form of downburst, the microburst, is the most often implicated in crashes because of their rapid onset and swift changes in wind and aerodynamic conditions over short distances. Most downbursts are associated with visible precipitation shafts, however, dry microbursts are generally invisible to the naked eye. At least one fatal commercial airline accident was associated with flying through a tornado.

== Life cycle or stages ==
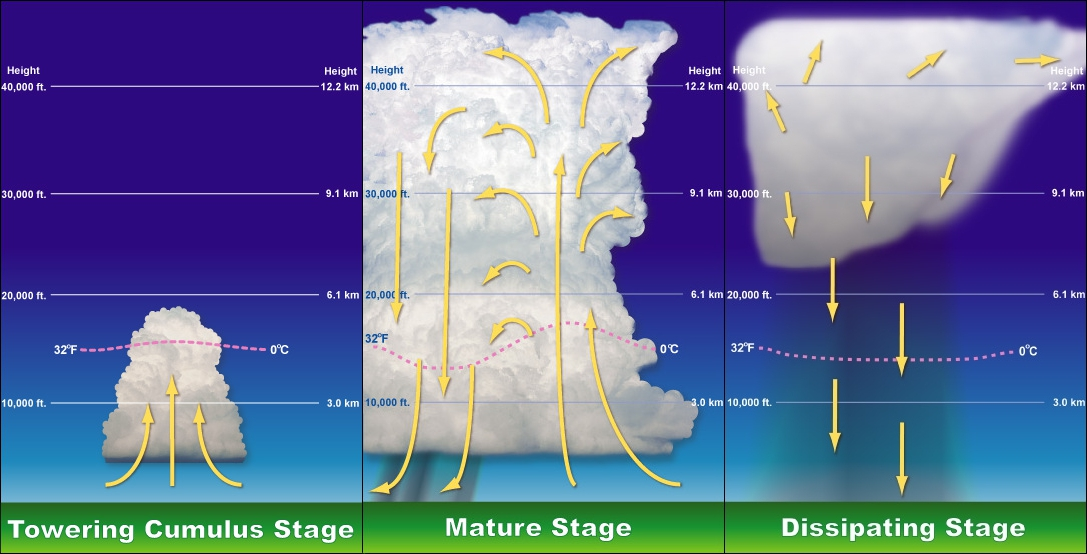
Stages of a cumulonimbus cloud's life.

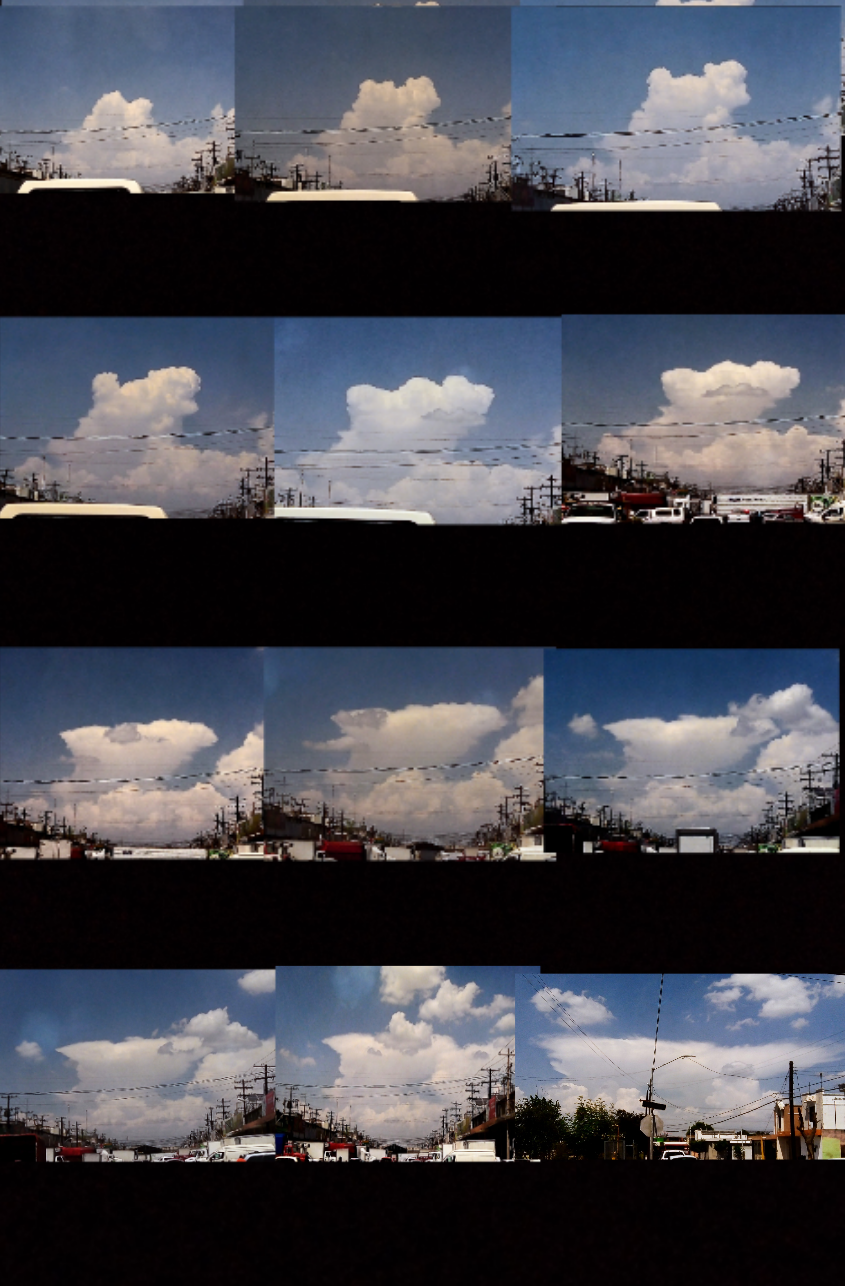
Transformation from a mature cumulus congestus cloud to a mature cumulonimbus incus

In general, cumulonimbus require moisture, an unstable air mass, and a lifting force in order to form. Cumulonimbus typically go through three stages: the developing stage, the mature stage (where the main cloud may reach supercell status in favorable conditions), and the dissipation stage. The average thunderstorm has a 24 km (15 mi) diameter and a height of approximately 12.2 km (40,000 ft). Depending on the conditions present in the atmosphere, these three stages take an average of 30 minutes to go through.

== See also ==
- Atmospheric convection
- Atmospheric thermodynamics
- Convective instability
- Hot tower
- Lifted condensation level (LCL), convective condensation level (CCL), level of free convection (LFC), and free convective layer (FCL)
- William Rankin
- Ewa Wiśnierska
