= Helm Wind =

English weather phenomenon

Helm
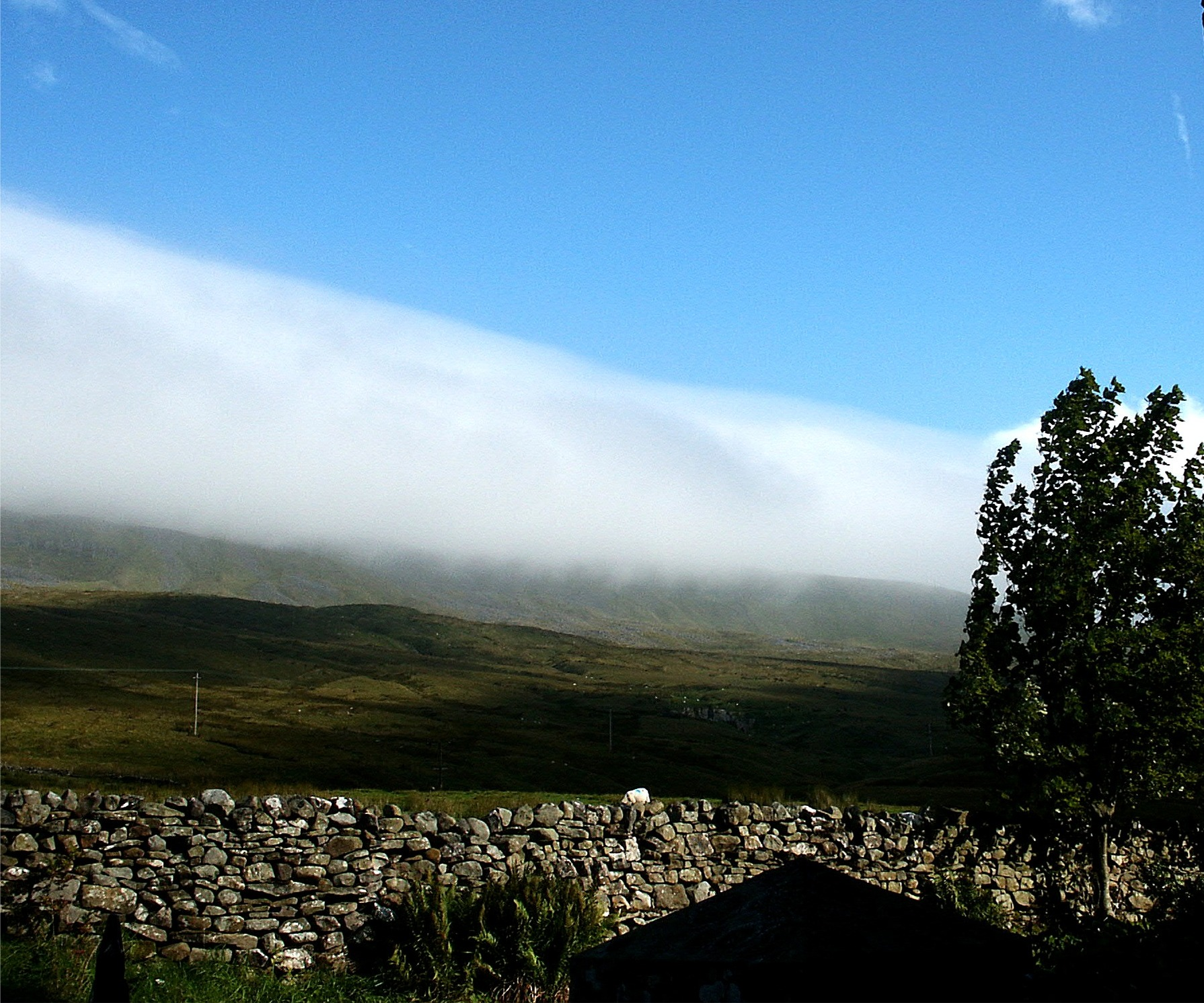
- Helm Bar over Mallerstang Edge

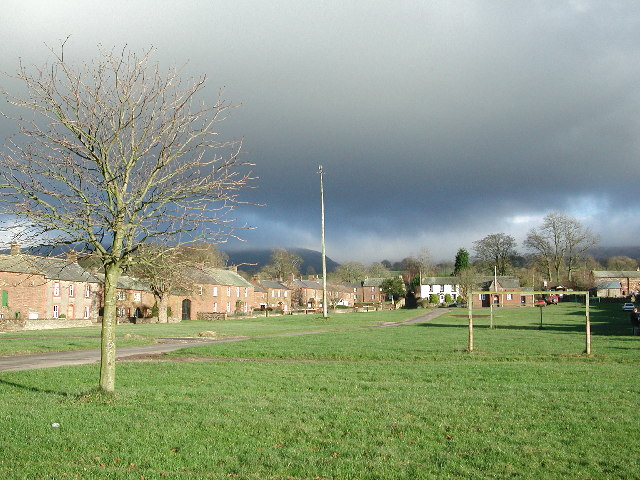
A Helm Wind coming down from the Pennine Fells.

The Helm Wind is a strong north-easterly Foehn wind in Cumbria, England, which blows down the south-west slope of the Cross Fell escarpment. It is the only named wind in the British Isles, although many other mountain regions in Britain exhibit the same phenomenon when the weather conditions are favourable. It may take its name from the helmet or cap of cloud which forms above Cross Fell, known as the Helm Bar, since a line of clouds over the fells can predict and accompany a Helm.

The Helm wind can be so forceful that it disrupts the community and generates tales of haystacks blown away and riders forced out of their saddles. Train conductors have genuine trouble operating locomotives during a Helm. In 1884, it was observed that the Helm usually did not bring rain, and it coincided with an anticyclone in the North Atlantic.

Research into the helm wind was carried out by Gordon Manley in 1937. He set up a camp 45 feet below the summit of Dun Fell to observe the phenomenon. He interpreted the phenomenon in hydrodynamic terms as a "standing wave" and "rotor", a model confirmed in 1939 by glider flights. Manley found that the crest of the mountain needed to be fairly level and the downward slope not too steep or uneven in order for a Helm to form.

The dale at the head of the Eden Valley has its own Helm Wind, which sweeps over Mallerstang Edge, particularly affecting the central part of the dale. This can be similarly fierce and can blow for two days or more, sometimes sounding like an express train. As with the wind at Cross Fell, its arrival is accompanied by the formation of a dense cap of cloud (a "Helm Bar") which, in this case, forms along the high ground on the eastern side of the dale.

In 2025, Sarah Hall titled a novel Helm. The wind is personified and plays a part in the lives of several generations of characters.
