= Virga =

Streak or shaft of precipitation that evaporates or sublimates before reaching the ground

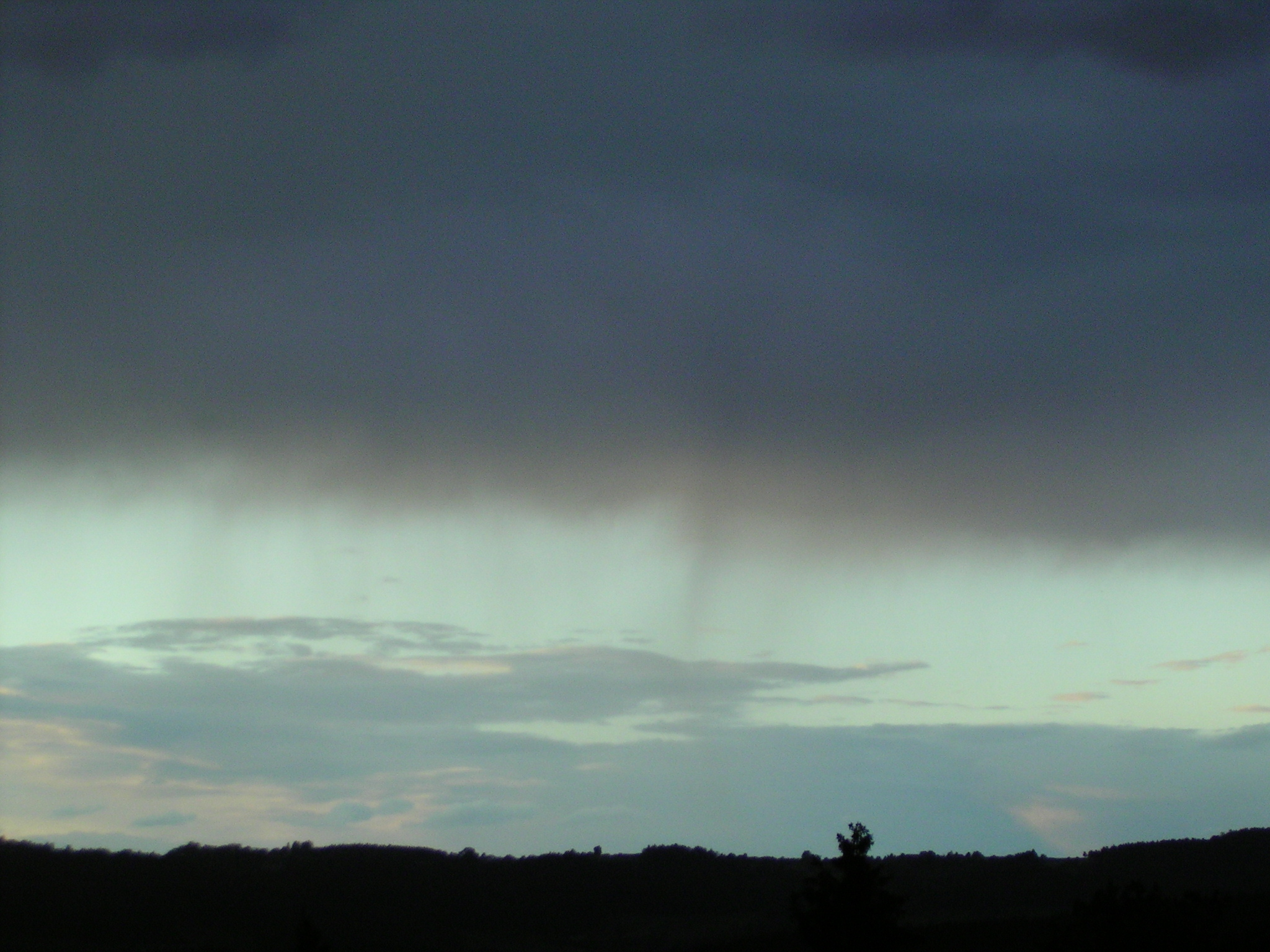
Nimbostratus virga

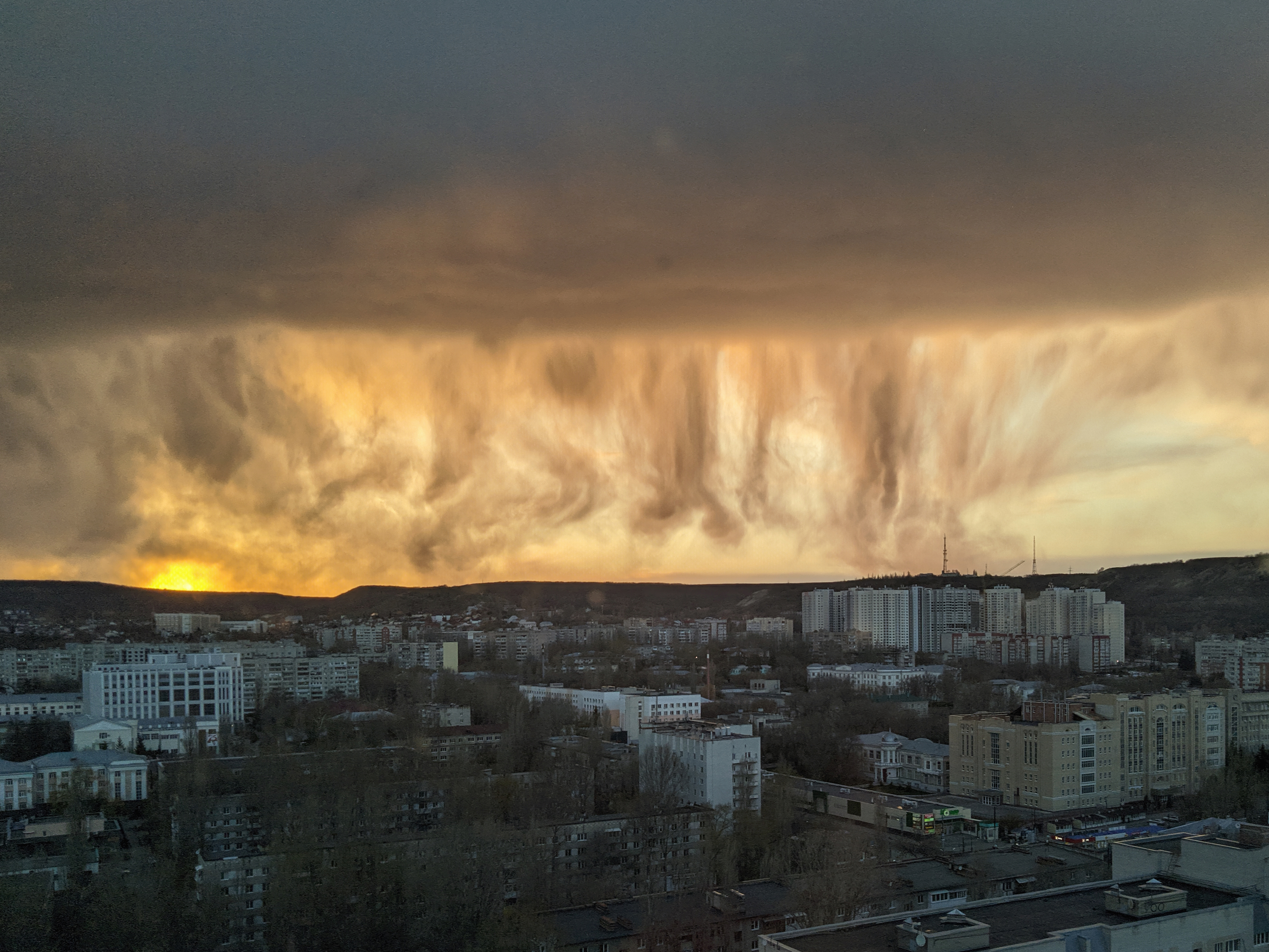
Virga during a sunset over Saratov in south-west Russia

A virga, also called a dry storm, is an observable streak or shaft of precipitation that evaporates or sublimates before reaching the ground. A shaft of precipitation that does not evaporate before reaching the ground is known in meteorology as a precipitation shaft. At high altitudes, precipitation falls mainly as ice crystals before melting and finally evaporating. This is often due to compressional heating, because air pressure increases closer to the ground. Virga is very common in deserts and temperate climates. In North America, it is commonly seen in the Western United States and the Canadian Prairies. It is also very common in the Middle East, Australia, and North Africa.

Virgae can cause varying weather effects because as rain is changed from liquid to vapor form it removes significant amounts of heat from the air due to water's high heat of vaporization. Precipitation falling into these cooling downdrafts may eventually reach the ground. In some instances these pockets of colder air can descend rapidly, creating a wet or dry microburst which can be extremely hazardous to aviation. Conversely, precipitation evaporating at high altitude can compressionally heat as it falls, and result in a gusty downburst which may substantially and rapidly warm the surface temperature. This fairly rare phenomenon, a heat burst, also tends to be of exceedingly dry air.

Ice virgae can be produced by a natural seeder-feeder mechanism in which ice crystals from upper mixed-phase clouds fall into lower-lying liquid clouds and then grow larger by riming or vapour deposition through the Wegener–Bergeron–Findeisen process.

== Etymology ==
The word is derived from the Latin virga, meaning rod, sprig, staff, branch, shoot, twig, spray, sprout, switch or graft.

== Elsewhere in the Solar System ==
Sulfuric acid rain in the atmosphere of Venus evaporates before reaching the ground due to the high heat near the surface. Similarly, virgae happen on gas giant planets such as Jupiter. In September 2008, NASA's Phoenix lander discovered a snow variety of virga falling from Martian clouds.

== See also ==
- Dry thunderstorm
- Fallstreak hole
- Precipitation shaft
- Sun pillar
