= Precipitation shaft =

Weather phenomenon viewed from distance

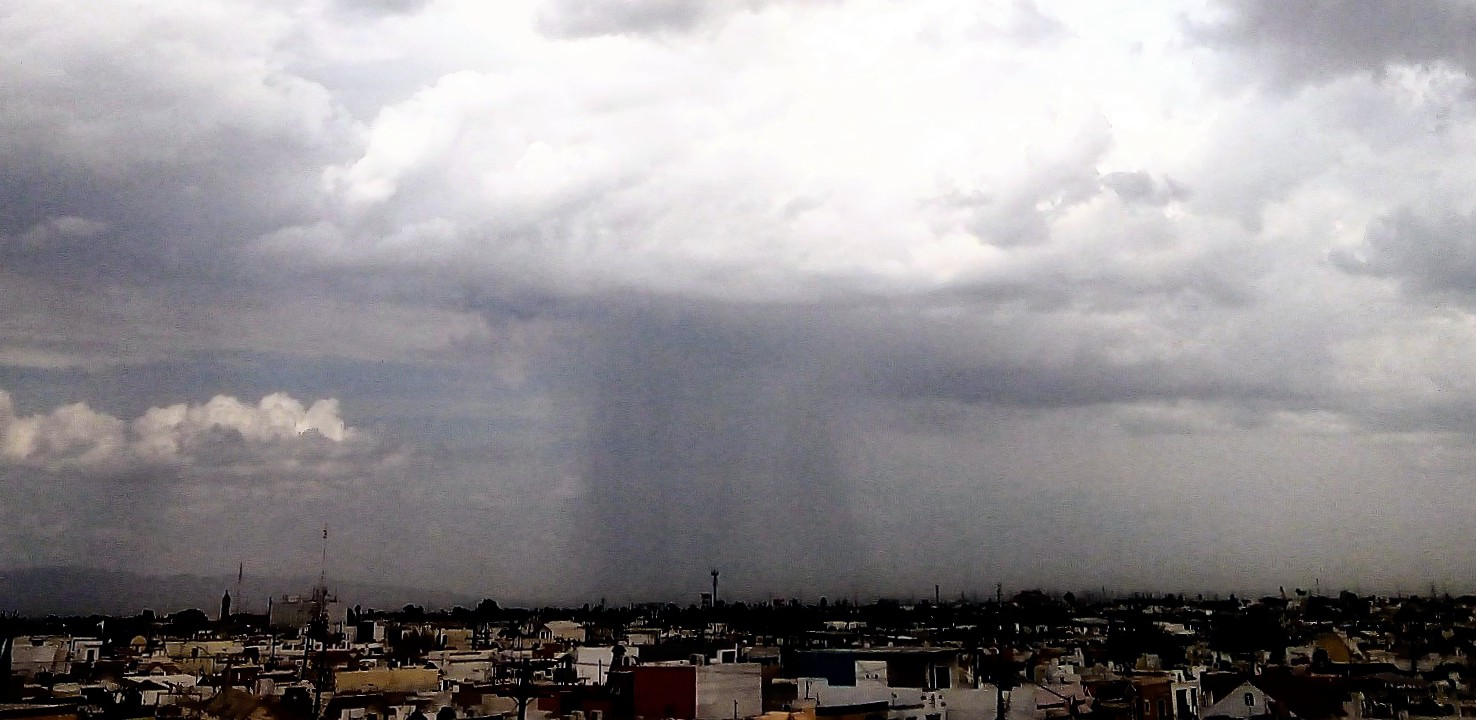
A rain shaft at the base of a thunderstorm

A precipitation shaft or, depending on the precipitation type, a rain shaft or hail shaft, is a weather phenomenon, often visible from the ground at large distances from the storm system, as a vertical shaft of heavy rain, hail, or snow, generally localized over a relatively small area. Depending on the type of precipitation and lighting, these shafts can vary greatly in color, appearing as very dark, nearly white, or even faintly glowing.

This is different from a virga, which is a shaft of precipitation that evaporates before reaching the ground.

== Formation ==
A precipitation shaft is mostly found underneath convective clouds, such as cumulonimbus cloud or cumulus congestus cloud during a downpour storm, as these have well defined vertical drafts (updrafts and downdrafts) needed for heavy precipitation. However, an advancing nimbostratus cloud could have a diffuse precipitation leading edge, so its shaft may be unclear.

Developing rain shafts often have a fuzzy, bulbous appearance as they descend. If a source of dry air is present at higher altitude and the air into which the rain is falling is sufficiently warm, then strong, possibly damaging microbursts are possible as sinking air forms. Wet microbursts, normally producing more than 25 mm (0.98 in) of rain at ground level, can strengthen downdraft, and cause more intense and widespread damage than dry microbursts.

== See also ==
- Downburst
- Shower
