= Cumulonimbus incus =

Type of cumulus cloud

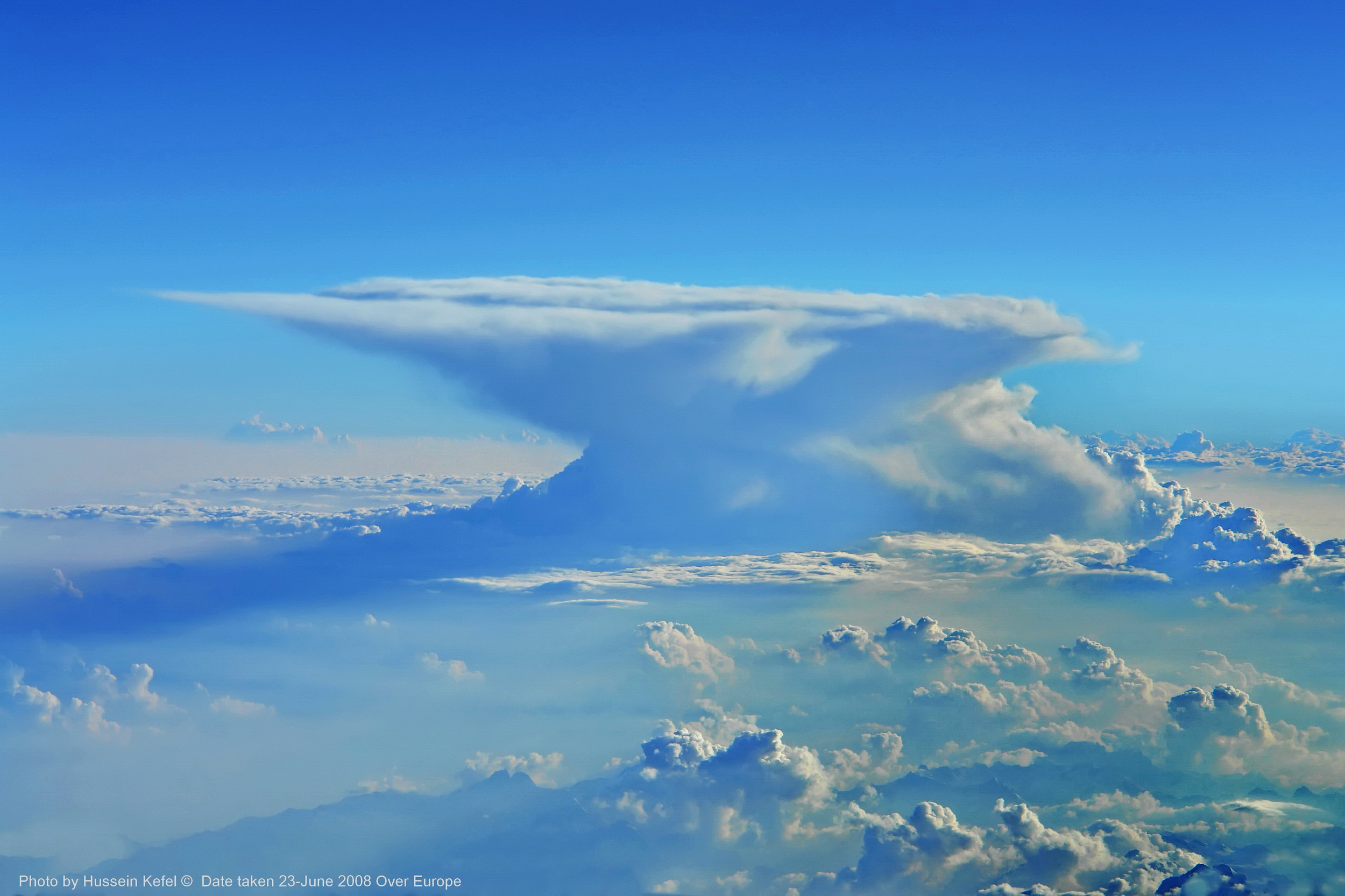
- A cumulonimbus incus cloud, showing the characteristic anvil-top shape the cloud type displays
- Abbreviation: Cb inc.
- Genus: Cumulonimbus (heap, cloud/severe rain)
- Species: Capillatus (Having hair)
- Variety: None
- Altitude: Ground to 23,000 m (75,000 ft)
- Classification: Family C (Low-level)
- Appearance: Large flat-top cloud
- Precipitation: Very common rain, snow, snow pellets or hail, heavy at times

A cumulonimbus incus cloud (from Latin incus 'anvil'), also called a thunderhead or anvil cloud, is a cumulonimbus cloud that has reached the level of stratospheric stability and has formed the characteristic flat, anvil-shaped top. It signifies a thunderstorm in its mature stage, succeeding the cumulonimbus calvus stage. Cumulonimbus incus is a subtype of cumulonimbus capillatus. These clouds are commonly associated with severe weather, including heavy rain, downbursts, and occasionally a tornado.

== Hazards ==
A cumulonimbus incus is a mature thunderstorm cloud generating many dangerous elements.

- Lightning: this storm cloud is capable of producing bursts of cloud-to-ground lightning, as well as the rarer, and far more powerful positive lightning.
- Hail: hailstones may fall from this cloud if it is a highly unstable environment (which favours a more vigorous storm updraft).
- Heavy rain: this cloud may drop several inches (or centimeters) of rain in a short amount of time. This can cause flash flooding.
- Strong wind: gale-force winds from a downburst may occur under this cloud.
- Tornadoes: in severe cases (most commonly with supercells), it can produce tornadoes.

== Classification ==
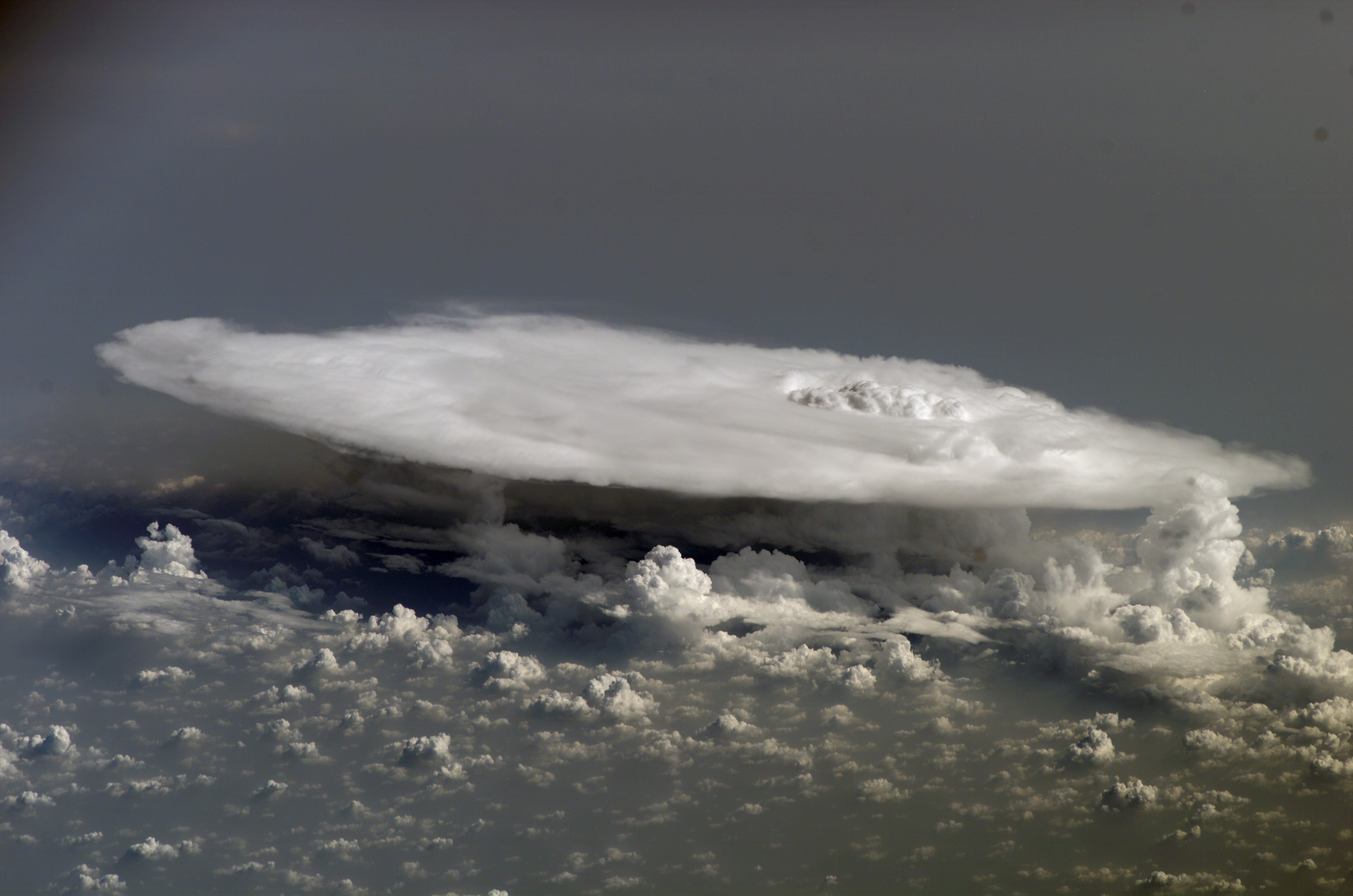
Cumulonimbus incus over Africa, seen from the International Space Station

Cumulonimbus clouds can be powerful. If the correct atmospheric conditions are met, they can grow into a supercell storm. This cloud may be a single-cell thunderstorm or one cell in a multicellular thunderstorm. They are capable of producing severe storm conditions for a short amount of time.
