= Index of meteorology articles =

This is a list of meteorology topics. The terms relate to meteorology, the interdisciplinary scientific study of the atmosphere that focuses on weather processes and forecasting. (see also: List of meteorological phenomena)

== A ==
- advection
- aeroacoustics
- aerobiology
- aerology
- air parcel (in meteorology)
- air quality index (AQI)
- airshed (in meteorology)
- American Geophysical Union (AGU)
- American Meteorological Society (AMS)
- anabatic wind
- anemometer
- annular hurricane
- anticyclone (in meteorology)
- apparent wind
- Atlantic Oceanographic and Meteorological Laboratory (AOML)
- Atlantic hurricane season
- atmometer
- atmosphere
- Atmospheric Model Intercomparison Project (AMIP)
- Atmospheric Radiation Measurement (ARM)
- (atmospheric boundary layer [ABL]) planetary boundary layer (PBL)
- atmospheric chemistry
- atmospheric circulation
- atmospheric convection
- atmospheric dispersion modeling
- atmospheric electricity
- atmospheric icing
- atmospheric physics
- atmospheric pressure
- atmospheric sciences
- atmospheric stratification
- atmospheric thermodynamics
- atmospheric window (see under Threats)

== B ==
- ball lightning
- balloon (aircraft)
- baroclinity
- barotropicity
- barometer ("to measure atmospheric pressure")
- berg wind
- biometeorology
- blizzard
- bomb (meteorology)
- buoyancy
- Bureau of Meteorology (in Australia)

== C ==
- Canada Weather Extremes
- Canadian Hurricane Centre (CHC)
- Cape Verde-type hurricane
- capping inversion (in meteorology) (see "severe thunderstorms" in paragraph 5)
- carbon cycle
- carbon fixation
- carbon flux
- carbon monoxide (see under Atmospheric presence)
- ceiling balloon ("to determine the height of the base of clouds above ground level")
- ceilometer ("to determine the height of a cloud base")
- celestial coordinate system
- celestial equator
- celestial horizon (rational horizon)
- celestial navigation (astronavigation)
- celestial pole
- Celsius
- Center for Analysis and Prediction of Storms (CAPS) (in Oklahoma in the US)
- Center for the Study of Carbon Dioxide and Global Change (based in Arizona in the US)
- (Central America Hurricane of 1857: see) SS Central America (Ship of Gold)
- Central Florida Tornado of February 2007
- Certified Consulting Meteorologist
- chaos theory (see "butterfly effect" under Chaotic dynamics)
- (Chapman cycle: see) ozone-oxygen cycle
- chemtrail theory
- Chicago Climate Exchange (CCX)
- chinook wind (see "inversion smog" under Chinooks and health)
- Henry Helm Clayton
- clear-air turbulence (CAT)
- climate
- climate change
- Climate Diagnostics Center (in the US)
- climate engineering
- (climate forcing: see) radiative forcing
- Climate Group
- climate house
- climate model
- climate modeller
- Climate Monitoring and Diagnostics Laboratory (CMDL) (in the US)
- Climate Outreach and Information Network (COIN) (British charity)
- (climate parameters, forcings and feedbacks: see) parametrization (climate)
- Climate Prediction Center (CPC)
- (climate science: see) climatology
- climate sensitivity
- (climate simulation: see) climate model
- climate surprise
- (climate techno-fix: see) climate engineering
- (climate theory: see) Charles de Secondat, Baron de Montesquieu (see "climate theory" in paragraph 3 under Political views)
- (climate variability: see) climate change
- (climate warming: see) global warming
- (climate weapon: see) Weather modification (see under In the military)
- climateprediction.net (CPDN) (distributed computing project)
- climatic determinism (equatorial paradox) (see also environmental determinism)
- Climatic Regions of India
- Climatic Research Unit (at the University of East Anglia in the UK)
- (climatic zone: see) clime
- climatology
- clime (climatic zone)
- Clinton Foundation (see under Clinton Climate Initiative (CCI))
- cloud
- cloud albedo ("a measure of the reflectivity of a cloud")
- cloud base ("the lowest altitude of the visible portion of a cloud")
- cloud chamber (Wilson chamber) ("for detecting ... ionizing radiation")
- cloud condensation nuclei (CCNs) (see under Phytoplankton role)
- cloud cover
- cloud feedback
- cloud forcing (see "greenhouse effect" in paragraph 2)
- cloud forest
- (cloud formation: see) nephology
- cloud physics
- cloud seeding
- cloud street
- cloud suck
- cloudburst (see "destruction" in paragraph 2 and see "Mumbai" in paragraph 3)
- CloudSat ("a NASA environmental satellite")
- coefficient of haze (in meteorology)
- cold-core low
- cold weather boot
- cold weather rule (cold weather law) (for public utility companies)
- (coldest place on earth: see) climate of Antarctica (see under Temperature)
- coldest temperature achieved on Earth
- Colorado low
- Community Climate System Model
- continental climate
- contrail
- controlled airspace
- controlled atmosphere (for agricultural storage)
- convection (see under Atmospheric convection)
- convective available potential energy (CAPE) (in meteorology)
- convective condensation level (CCL)
- convective inhibition (CIN)
- convective instability
- convective temperature (T_{c})
- Cooperative Institute for Atmospheric Sciences and Terrestrial Applications (CIASTA)
- Cooperative Institute for Arctic Research
- Cooperative Institute for Climate and Ocean Research (CICOR)
- Cooperative Institute for Climate Applications and Research (CICAR)
- Cooperative Institute for Climate Science (CICS)
- Cooperative Institute for Limnology and Ecosystems Research (CILER)
- Cooperative Institute for Marine and Atmospheric Studies (CIMAS)
- Cooperative Institute for Mesoscale Meteorological Studies (CIMMS)
- Cooperative Institute for Meteorological Satellite Studies (CIMSS)
- Cooperative Institute for Precipitation Systems (CIPS)
- Cooperative Institute for Research in Environmental Sciences (CIRES)
- Cooperative Institute for Research in the Atmosphere (CIRA)
- corona (meteorology)
- COSMIC (Constellation Observing System for Meteorology, Ionosphere, and Climate)
- Cosmic Anisotropy Telescope (CAT)
- Cosmic Background Explorer (COBE) ("to investigate the cosmic background radiation" etc.)
- cosmic microwave background experiments
- cosmic microwave background radiation (CMB) (CMBR) (CBR) (MBR)
- cosmic noise
- cosmic ray (see under Lightning)
- Cosmochemical Periodic Table of the Elements in the Solar System
- cosmochemistry
- cumulonimbus cloud (see under Effects)
- (cumulonimbus with mammatus: see) mammatus cloud
- (cumulonimbus with pileus: see) pileus (meteorology)
- cumulus castellanus cloud
- cumulus cloud
- cumulus congestus cloud
- cumulus humilis cloud
- cumulus mediocris cloud
- (cup anemometer: see) anemometer (see under Cup anemometers)
- current solar income
- cyclogenesis
- cyclone
- cyclone furnace (a type of coal combustor)
- (cyclone preparedness: see) hurricane preparedness
- cyclonic separation (method of removing particles from an air or gas stream)

== D ==
- D region (in the atmosphere)
- Darrieus wind turbine
- dawn
- dBZ (meteorology)
- degree (temperature)
- deicing
- dendroclimatology ("extracting past climate information from information in trees")
- density altitude
- Denver Convergence Vorticity Zone (DCVZ)
- deposition (physics)
- (depression [meteorology]: see) low pressure area
- derecho (see also List of derecho events)
- dew
- dew point (dewpoint, T_{d})
- dew point depression
- disdrometer
- downwelling
- drizzle
- drought
- dry-bulb temperature
- dry line (dew point line)
- dry punch
- dry season
- dusk

== E ==
- Earth's atmosphere
- Earth's magnetic field
- Earth System Research Laboratories (ESRL)
- economics of global warming
- Emagram
- effect of Hurricane Katrina on New Orleans (see also Hurricane Katrina effects by region)
- effect of sun angle on climate
- Energy meteorology
- Enhanced Fujita scale (EF scale)
- eolian processes
- equator (see under Equatorial seasons and climate)
- equilibrium level (EL)
- equivalent potential temperature
- equivalent temperature
- European Centre for Medium-Range Weather Forecasts (ECMWF)
- European Climate Change Programme (ECCP)
- European emission standards (for motor vehicles)
- European Severe Storms Laboratory (ESSL)
- European windstorm
- evaporation
- evaporative cooler
- evaporative cooling
- evaporite (a mineral sediment resulting from evaporation of saline water)
- evapotranspiration (ET) (sum of evaporation and plant transpiration)
- exhaust gas recirculation (EGR) (exhaust gas recycling)
- exosphere (layer of atmosphere)
- extratropical cyclone (mid-latitude cyclone)
- extreme weather
- extremes on Earth

== F ==
- fire whirl
- firestorm
- fog
- forensic meteorology
- free convective layer (FCL)
- freezing rain
- (front [meteorology]: see) surface weather analysis
- frontogenesis
- frontolysis
- frost
- frost creep (frost heave)
- frost flowers (frost castles) (ice castles) (ice ribbons) (ice blossoms)
- frost heaving (frost heave)
- frost law
- frost line
- (frost point: see) dew point (dewpoint)
- frostbite
- Fujita scale (F scale) (for measuring tornadoes)
- fulgurite
- (full lunar eclipse: see) lunar eclipse
- full-spectrum light
- funnel cloud (related to a tornado)

== G ==
- galactic cosmic ray (GCR)
- gale
- gale warning
- Galileo thermometer (Galilean thermometer)
- Galveston, Texas (see under Hurricane of 1900 and recovery)
- Galveston Hurricane of 1900 (in the US)
- gas balloon (see under History)
- gas flare (flare stack)
- (gas warfare: see) chemical warfare
- Geophysical Fluid Dynamics Laboratory (GFDL)
- glossary of climate change
- glossary of environmental science
- glossary of tornado terms
- glossary of tropical cyclone terms
- glossary of wildfire terms
- gustnado

== Ge-Gk ==
- geomagnetic storm
- (geomagnetism: see) Earth's magnetic field
- geospatial technology (Spatial Information Technology)
- Geostationary Operational Environmental Satellite (GOES) (a program of the US)
- geostatistics
- geostrophic wind
- Global Atmosphere Watch (GAW)
- Global Forecast System (GFS)
- global warming
- greenhouse effect
- greenhouse gas (GHG)
- growing degree day (GDD)
- growing season
- gust front

== H ==
- hail
- halo (optical phenomenon)
- haze
- heat
- (heat budget: see) radiation budget
- (heat equator: see) thermal equator
- (heat lightning: see) lightning
- heat wave
- heating degree day (HDD)
- (Heaviside layer) Kennelly–Heaviside layer (E region) (in the atmosphere)
- Heavy snow warning
- heliostat
- High Frequency Active Auroral Research Program (HAARP)
- high pressure area
- High Resolution Fly's Eye Cosmic Ray Detector
- high-altitude airship (HAA)
- hodograph
- humid continental climate
- humid subtropical climate
- (humidex) heat index (HI)
- humidity
- HurriQuake nail (for resisting hurricanes and earthquakes)
- (hydrologic cycle) water cycle
- hydrological phenomenon
- hydrology
- hydrosphere
- hygrometer (different from hydrometer)
- hypercane ("hypothetical class of hurricane")

== I ==
- ice
- Ice Accretion Indicator
- ice age
- ice storm
- Ice Storm Warning
- illuminance
- impact winter
- impluvium
- in situ (see under Earth and atmospheric sciences)
- incidental radiator
- India Meteorological Department
- Indian summer
- infrared (IR) radiation (see under Meteorology)
- insolation
- instrument meteorological conditions (IMG)
- instrumental temperature record
- intentional radiator
- International Meteorological Organization (IMO)
- International Temperature Scale of 1990 (ITS-90)
- International Terrestrial Reference System (ITRS)
- inversion
- Invest (meteorology)
- ion wind (ion wind) (coronal wind)
- ionosonde (chirpsounder)
- ionosphere
- ionospheric reflection
- ionospheric sounding
- iron cycle
- irradiance
- irradiation
- isobar
- isochore (in a thermodynamic diagram)
- isodrosotherm
- isogon (meteorology)
- (isogram) contour line (level set) (isarithm)
- isohel
- isohume
- isohyet
- isohypse (in topography)
- isotherm

== K ==
- katabatic wind

== L ==
- Laboratory for Atmospheric and Space Physics (LASP)
- lake effect snow (a snowsquall)
- (lake surge: see) storm surge
- land hemisphere
- land lighthouse
- landspout
- lapse rate
- Lemon technique
- lenticular cloud
- level of free convection (LFC)
- life zone
- lifted condensation level (LCL)
- lifted index (LI)
- lightning
- lightning detection
- lightning prediction system
- lightning rod (lightning protector) (lightning finial)
- lightning safety
- (lightning storm) thunderstorm (T-storm) (electrical storm)
- lightvessel (lightship)
- line echo wave pattern (LEWP)
- line source ("a source of air, noise, water contamination or electromagnetic radiation")
- (list of all-time high and low temperatures by state: see) U.S. state temperature extremes
- list of basic earth science topics
- list of Category 5 Atlantic hurricanes
- list of Category 5 Pacific hurricanes
- list of cloud types
- list of coastal weather stations of the United Kingdom
- list of countries by carbon dioxide emissions
- list of countries by carbon dioxide emissions per capita
- list of Earth observation satellites
- list of lighthouses and lightvessels
- list of meteorological phenomena
- list of most polluting power stations
- list of named tropical cyclones
- list of Northern Indian Ocean tropical cyclone seasons
- List of derecho events
- list of power outages
- list of scientific journals in earth and atmospheric sciences
- list of Solar Cycles (list of sunspot cycles)
- list of tornado-related deaths at schools
- list of weather instruments
- list of weather records
- Little Ice Age (LIA)
- Local storm report
- low pressure area (see same for "low-pressure cell")
- (lowest elevations: see) list of places on land with elevations below sea level
- (luminous pollution) light pollution (photopollution)
- lunar phase

== M ==
- Madden–Julian oscillation (MJO)
- magnetic storm (geomagnetic storm)
- magnetopause
- magnetosheath
- magnetosphere
- marine west coast climate (maritime climate) (oceanic climate)
- Mars Climate Orbiter
- Mars Radiation Environment Experiment (Martian Radiation Experiment) (MARIE)
- maximum parcel level (MPL)
- maximum sustained wind
- Max Planck Institute for Meteorology (MPI-M)
- mean radiant temperature (MRT)
- Mediterranean climate
- medium Earth orbit (MEO) (intermediate circular orbit) (ICO)
- megathermal (macrothermal)
- melting
- mercury (element) (see "Clean Air Act" under United States)
- mercury-in-glass thermometer
- mesopause
- mesoscale convective complex (MCC)
- mesoscale convective system (MCS)
- mesoscale convective vortex (MCV)
- mesoscale meteorology
- mesocyclone
- mesohigh
- mesolow
- mesonet
- mesosphere
- mesothermal (in climatology)
- mesovortex
- Met Office (previously Meteorological Office) (the UK's national weather service)
- meteorological history of Hurricane Katrina
- Meteorological Service of Canada (MSC)
- meteorology
- metrology
- Miami Tornado (of May 12, 1997)
- Miami tornadoes of 2003
- microclimate
- microscale meteorology
- Mid-Atlantic United States flood of 2006
- middle latitudes
- midnight
- millimeter cloud radar (millimeter wave cloud radar) (MMCR)
- misoscale meteorology
- mist
- mixed layer
- mixing ratio
- moisture
- molecular-scale temperature
- moonlight

== N ==
- NASA Clean Air Study
- NASA Earth Observatory
- NASA World Wind (virtual globe)
- National Ambient Air Quality Standards (NAAQS) (in the US)
- National Center for Atmospheric Research (NCAR) (in the US)
- National Centers for Environmental Prediction (NCEP) (in the US)
- National Climatic Data Center (NCDC) (in the US)
- National Emissions Standards for Hazardous Air Pollutants (NESHAPS) (in the US)
- (National Environmental Satellite, Data and Information Service: see) National Oceanic and Atmospheric Administration (NOAA) (in the US)
- National Geomagnetism Program (in the US)
- National Hurricane Center (NHC) (in the US)
- National Map (in the US)
- National Oceanic and Atmospheric Administration (NOAA) (in the US)
- (National Severe Storms Forecast Center [NSSFC]: renamed) Storm Prediction Center (SPC) (in the US)
- National Severe Storms Laboratory (NSSL) (in the US)
- National Snow and Ice Data Center (NSIDC) (in the US)
- National Solar Observatory (in the US)
- National Weather Association (NWA) (in the US)
- National Weather Center (NWC) (in the US)
- National Weather Service bulletin for New Orleans region (at 10:11 a.m., August 28, 2005)
- National Weather Service (NWS)
- nautical almanac
- nephology
- nephoscope
- night sky
- nimbus cloud
- nitrogen cycle
- (nitrogen pollution: see) eutrophication (see under Atmospheric deposition)
- NOAA Weather Radio All Hazards (NWR) (of the US)
- noctilucent cloud
- North Atlantic tropical cyclone
- North Pole
- numerical weather prediction

== O ==
- observational astronomy (see "light pollution" in places)
- observatory (see also list of observatories)
- ocean heat content (OHC)
- Ocean Prediction Center (OHC)
- occultation
- oceanic climate
- Office of Oceanic and Atmospheric Research (OAR)
- 1999 Oklahoma tornado outbreak
- orographic lift
- outflow boundary
- oxygen
- oxygen cycle
- ozone
- ozone depletion
- ozone depletion potential (ODP)
- ozone layer (ozonosphere layer)
- ozone-oxygen cycle

== P ==
- Pacific decadal oscillation
- paleoclimatology
- paleomagnetism
- paleotempestology
- parts-per notation
- photovore
- planetary boundary layer (PBL)
- pluvial lake
- pneumonia front
- polar circle
- polar climate
- polar easterlies
- polar high
- polar ice cap
- (polar light: see) aurora (astronomy)
- polar low
- (polar mesospheric cloud) noctilucent cloud
- polar mesospheric summer echoes (PMSE)
- polar night
- polar region
- (polar reversal) magnetic polarity reversal
- polar stratospheric cloud (PSC) (nacreous cloud)
- polar vortex
- Polarization (waves) (see under Polarization effects in everyday life)
- pole shift theory
- positive streamer
- post-glacial rebound
- potential evaporation
- potential temperature
- precipitation
- pressure gradient
- pressure gradient force (PGF)
- pyrocumulus

== Q ==
- Quantitative precipitation estimation
- Quantitative precipitation forecast
- Quasi-geostrophic equations

== R ==
- radiance
- radiant barrier
- radiant energy
- radiation
- radiation budget
- radiation hormesis
- radiation poisoning (radiation sickness)
- radiative cooling
- radiative forcing
- radiological weapon (radiological dispersion device [RDD])
- radiosonde
- radius of outermost closed isobar
- rain
- rain fade (fading of signal by rain or snow)
- rain gauge
- rain sensor
- rain shadow
- rainbow
- rainforest
- rarefaction
- RealClimate (commentary site on climate science)
- RealSky (digital photographic sky atlas)
- relative humidity
- relative pressure
- (relief precipitation: see) orographic lift
- research balloon
- resistance thermometer (resistance temperature detector) (RTD)
- rime (frost)

== S ==
- Saffir-Simpson Hurricane Scale
- satellite temperature measurements
- (Sea Islands Hurricane) 1893 Sea Islands Hurricane
- sea level
- (sea level pressure) atmospheric pressure
- sea surface temperature (SST)
- severe weather
- severe weather terminology (United States)
- Skew-T log-P diagram
- sky
- skyglow
- smoke
- snow
- Solar and Heliospheric Observatory
- solar azimuth angle
- solar cell
- solar collector
- solar constant
- solar cycle
- solar eclipse
- solar flare (see under Hazards)
- solar furnace
- solar greenhouse (technical)
- solar heating
- solar maximum
- Solar Maximum Mission
- solar minimum
- solar mirror
- solar proton event
- solar radiation (solar irradiance)
- (solar storm) geomagnetic storm
- solar thermal collector
- solar thermal energy
- solar updraft tower
- solar variation
- solar wind
- solarium
- space geostrategy (astrostrategy) (geostrategy in space)
- Space Science and Engineering Center (SSEC)
- space weather
- (specific humidity: see) humidity (see under Specific Humidity)
- squall
- squall line
- (standard atmospheric pressure) atmospheric pressure (standard atmosphere)
- standard conditions for temperature and pressure
- storm
- storm cellar
- storm chasing
- storm drain (storm sewer) (stormwater drain)
- storm-scale
- storm surge
- storm tide
- storm track
- storm warning (see same for "storm watch")
- storm scale
- stormwater
- stratopause
- stratosphere
- Stüve diagram
- subarctic
- subarctic climate
- subtropical cyclone (see same for "subtropical depression" and for "subtropical storm")
- subtropics (see same for "subtropical" and for "subtropical climate")
- sudden ionospheric disturbance (SID)
- sudden stratospheric warming
- sun
- sun dog (sundog) (parhelion)
- sunlight
- sunshower
- sunspot (see under "Significant events")
- supercell
- surface temperature inversion
- surface weather analysis
- surface weather observation
- synoptic scale meteorology

== T ==
- teleconnection
- temperature
- temperature extremes
- (temperature inversion) inversion (meteorology)
- temperature record
- temperature record of the past 1000 years
- tephigram
- The Weather Channel (TWC)
- The Weather Network
- thermal equator
- thermodynamic temperature
- thermometer
- thunder
- thundersnow
- thunderstorm (electrical storm)
- TIMED (Thermosphere Ionosphere Mesosphere Energetics and Dynamics)
- TOR
- tornado
- tornado climatology
- tornado intensity
- tornado warning
- tornado watch
- tornado emergency
- tornadogenesis
- torr (symbol: Torr) (millimetre of mercury) (mmHg)
- Total Ozone Mapping Spectrometer (TOMS)
- tropical climate
- tropical cyclogenesis
- tropical cyclone (tropical storm) (typhoon) (hurricane)
- Tropical Cyclone Formation Alert (TCFA)
- tropical cyclone observation
- tropical cyclone prediction model
- tropical cyclone rainfall climatology
- tropical cyclone scales
- Tropical Ocean-Global Atmosphere program (TOGA)
- tropical rain belt
- Tropical Rainfall Measuring Mission (TRMM)
- Tropical Rainforest Heritage of Sumatra (in Indonesia)
- (Tropical Research Institute) Smithsonian Tropical Research Institute (STRI) (in Panama)
- Tropical upper tropospheric trough (TUTT)
- tropical wave (African easterly wave)
- tropopause
- troposphere
- Tropospheric Emission Spectrometer (TES)
- tropospheric ozone
- tsunami
- Tsunami PTSD Center (Tsunami Post Traumatic Stress Disorder Center)
- tsunami warning system
- typical meteorological year

== U ==
- U.S. state temperature extremes
- ultraviolet
- United States temperature extremes
- urban heat island (UHI)
- UV index

== V ==
- vapor pressure
- virtual temperature
- visual meteorological conditions
- vorticity

== W ==
- waterspout
- water vapor
- weather
- weather forecasting
- weather front
- weather lore
- Weather Modification Operations and Research Board (US)
- Weather Prediction Center (WPC)
- weather radar
- weather satellite
- wet-bulb potential temperature
- wet-bulb temperature
- wind
- wind chill
- wind direction
- wind gradient
- wind profiler
- wind shear
- wind speed
- windcatcher
- Windscale fire
- winter storm
- Winter Storm Warning
- Winter Weather Advisory
- World Asthma Day
- World Climate Change Conference, Moscow
- World Climate Conference
- World Climate Programme
- World Climate Report
- World Climate Research Programme
- World Meteorological Organization (WMO)
- World Solar Challenge

== Z ==
- Zonal wavenumber
