= Hodograph =

Vector representation of the movement of a body or fluid

A hodograph is a diagram that gives a vectorial visual representation of the movement of a body or a fluid. It is the locus of one end of a variable vector, with the other end fixed. The position of any plotted data on such a diagram is proportional to the velocity of the moving particle. It is also called a velocity diagram. It appears to have been used by James Bradley, but its practical development is mainly from Sir William Rowan Hamilton, who published an account of it in the Proceedings of the Royal Irish Academy in 1846.

== Applications ==
It is used in physics, astronomy, solid and fluid mechanics to plot deformation of material, motion of planets or any other data that involves the velocities of different parts of a body.

=== Meteorology ===
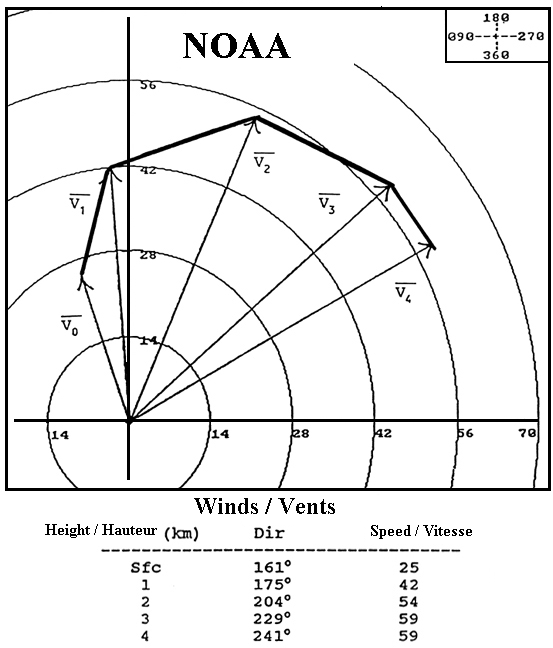
Hodograph plot of upper air winds from radiosonde

In meteorology, hodographs are used to plot winds from soundings of the Earth's atmosphere. It is a polar diagram where wind direction is indicated by the angle from the center axis and its strength by the distance from the center. In the figure, at the bottom one finds values of wind at 4 heights above ground. They are plotted by the vectors $\vec V_0$ to $\vec V_4$. One has to notice that direction are plotted as mentioned in the upper right corner.

With the hodograph and thermodynamic diagrams like the tephigram, meteorologists can calculate:

- Wind shear: The lines uniting the extremities of successive vectors represent the variation in direction and value of the wind in a layer of the atmosphere. Wind shear is important information in the development of thunderstorms and future evolution of wind at these levels.
- Turbulence: wind shear indicates possible turbulence that would cause a hazard to aviation.
- Temperature advection: change of temperature in a layer of air can be calculated by the direction of the wind at that level and the direction of the wind shear with the next level. In the northern hemisphere, warm air is to the right of the wind shear vector between levels in the atmosphere. The opposite is true in the southern hemisphere (see thermal wind). Using the example hodograph, the wind $\vec V_3$ from the southwest meets the right side of the wind shear vector which means warm advection is occurring and thus the air is warming at that level.

== Distributed hodograph ==
It is a method of presenting the velocity field of a point in planar motion. The velocity vector, drawn at scale, is shown perpendicular rather than tangent to the point path, usually oriented away from the center of curvature of the path.

== Hodograph transformation ==
Hodograph transformation is a technique used to transform nonlinear partial differential equations into linear version. It consists of interchanging the dependent and independent variables in the equation to achieve linearity.

== See also ==
- Visual calculus, a related approach useful in solving a variety of integral calculus problems.
- Laplace–Runge–Lenz vector, for an example in solving the Kepler problem
