= Lifting condensation level =

Height at which an air parcel becomes saturated

Schematic of the LCL in relation to the temperature (T) and dew point and their altitude (Z); the moist adiabatic temperature curve above the LCL is also sketched for reference

The lifting condensation level or lifted condensation level (LCL) is the height at which the relative humidity (RH) of an air parcel will reach 100% with respect to liquid water when it is cooled by dry adiabatic lifting. The RH of air increases when it is cooled, since the amount of water vapor in the air (i.e. its specific humidity) remains constant, while the saturation vapor pressure decreases almost exponentially with decreasing temperature. If the air parcel is lifting further beyond the LCL, water vapor in the air parcel will begin condensing, forming cloud droplets. (In the real atmosphere, it is usually necessary for air to be slightly supersaturated, normally by around 0.5%, before condensation occurs; this translates into about 10 meters or so of additional lifting above the LCL.) The LCL is a good approximation of the height of the cloud base which will be observed on days when air is lifted mechanically from the surface to the cloud base (e.g. due to convergence of airmasses).

== Determining the LCL ==
The LCL can be either computed or determined graphically using standard thermodynamic diagrams such as the skew-T log-P diagram or the tephigram. Nearly all of these formulations make use of the relationship between the LCL and the dew point, which is the temperature to which an air parcel needs to be cooled isobarically until its RH just reaches 100%. The LCL and dew point are similar, with one key difference: to find the LCL, an air parcel's pressure is decreased while it is lifted, causing it to expand, which in turn causes it to cool. To determine the dew point, in contrast, the pressure is kept constant, and the air parcel is cooled by bringing it into contact with a colder body (this is like the condensation you see on the outside of a glass full of a cold drink). Below the LCL, the dew point temperature is less than the actual ("dry bulb") temperature. As an air parcel is lifted, its pressure and temperature decrease. Its dew point temperature also decreases when the pressure is decreased, but not as quickly as its temperature decreases, so that if the pressure is decreased far enough, eventually the air parcel's temperature will be equal to the dew point temperature at that pressure. This point is the LCL; this is graphically depicted in the diagram.

Using this background, the LCL can be found on a standard thermodynamic diagram as follows:

1. Start at the initial temperature (T) and pressure of the air parcel and follow the dry adiabatic lapse rate line upward (provided that the RH in the air parcel is less than 100%, otherwise it is already at or above LCL).
2. From the initial dew point temperature (Td) of the parcel at its starting pressure, follow the line for the constant equilibrium mixing ratio (or "saturation mixing ratio") upward.
3. The intersection of these two lines is the LCL.

== Exact expression for the LCL ==
Until recently, it was thought that there was no exact, analytic formula for the LCL. In 2015, Yin et al. developed an analytical expression for LCL height using Lambert-W function under the assumption of constant latent heat of vaporization. Separately, in 2017, David Romps derived the explicit and analytic expression for the LCL and the analogous lifting deposition level (LDL) assuming only constant heat capacities:

$$\begin{alignat}{1}
T_{\text{LCL}} &\;\;=\; c \left[ W_{-1}\left( \text{RH}_l^{1/a} \, c \, e^c \right) \right]^{-1} T \\
p_{\text{LCL}} &\;\;=\; p \left(\frac{T_{\text{LCL}}}{T}\right)^{c_{pm}/R_m} \\
z_{\text{LCL}} &\;\;=\; z + \frac{c_{pm}}{g} \left( T - T_{\text{LCL}} \right) \\
a &\;\;=\; \frac{c_{pm}}{R_m} + \frac{c_{vl} - c_{pv}}{R_v} \\
b &\;\;=\; -\frac{E_{0v} - (c_{vv}-c_{vl}) T_{\text{trip}}}{R_vT} \\
c &\;\;=\; b/a \, ,
\end{alignat}$$

where $T$, $p$, $z$, and $\text{RH}_l$ are the parcel's initial temperature, pressure, height, and relative humidity with respect to liquid water, and $T_{\text{LCL}}$, $p_{\text{LCL}}$, and $z_{\text{LCL}}$ are the temperature, pressure, and height of the parcel at its LCL. The function $W_{-1}$ is the $-1$ branch of the Lambert W function. The best fit to empirical measurements of saturation vapor pressure is given by $R_a = 287.04 \text{ J/kg/K}$, $c_{va} = 719 \text{ J/kg/K}$, $c_{vv} = 1418 \text{ J/kg/K}$, $p_{\text{trip}} = 611.65 \text{ Pa}$, $T_{\text{trip}} = 273.16$ $\text{K}$, $E_{0v} = 2.3740 \times 10^6 \text{ J/kg}$, $R_v = 461 \text{ J/kg/K}$, and $c_{vl} = 4119 \text{ J/kg/K}$. Defining $q_v$ to be the mass fraction of water vapor in the air parcel, the parcel's specific gas constant and the specific heat capacity at constant volume are $R_m = (1-q_v) R_a + q_v R_v$ and $c_{pm} = (1-q_v) c_{pa} + q_v c_{pv}$, respectively.

Defining the lifting deposition level (LDL) as the height at which the air parcel becomes saturated with respect to ice, the analogous expression for the LDL is:

$$\begin{alignat}{1}
T_{\text{LDL}} &\;\;=\; c \left[ W_{-1}\left( \text{RH}_s^{1/a} \, c \, e^c \right) \right]^{-1} T \\
p_{\text{LDL}} &\;\;=\; p \left(\frac{T_{\text{LDL}}}{T}\right)^{c_{pm}/R_m} \\
z_{\text{LDL}} &\;\;=\; z + \frac{c_{pm}}{g} \left( T - T_{\text{LDL}} \right) \\
a &\;\;=\; \frac{c_{pm}}{R_m} + \frac{c_{vs} - c_{pv}}{R_v} \\
b &\;\;=\; -\frac{E_{0v} + E_{0s} - (c_{vv}-c_{vs})T_{\text{trip}}}{R_vT} \\
c &\;\;=\; b/a \, ,
\end{alignat}$$

where the best-fit constants are as defined above plus also $E_{0s} = 0.3337 \times 10^6 \text{ J/kg}$ and $c_{vs} = 1861 \text{ J/kg/K}$. Here, $\text{RH}_s$ is the initial relative humidity of the air parcel with respect to solid water (i.e., ice).

== Approximate expressions for the LCL ==
There are also many different ways to approximate the LCL, to various degrees of accuracy. The most well known and widely used among these is Espy's equation, which James Espy formulated already in the early 19th century. His equation makes use of the relationship between the LCL and dew point temperature discussed above. In the Earth's atmosphere near the surface, the lapse rate for dry adiabatic lifting is about 9.8 K/km, and the lapse rate of the dew point is about 1.8 K/km (it varies from about 1.6-1.9 K/km). This gives the slopes of the curves shown in the diagram. The altitude where they intersect can be computed as the ratio between the difference in the initial temperature and initial dew point temperature $T-T_d$ to the difference in the slopes of the two curves. Since the slopes are the two lapse rates, their difference is about 8 K/km. Inverting this gives 0.125 km/K, or 125 m/K. Recognizing this, Espy pointed out that the LCL can be approximated as:

$$h_{LCL} = \frac{T - T_d}{\Gamma_d - \Gamma_{dew}} = 125 (T - T_d)$$

where $h$ is height of the LCL (in meters), $T$ is temperature in degrees Celsius (or kelvins), and $T_d$ is dew-point temperature (likewise in degrees Celsius or kelvins, whichever is used for T). This formula is accurate to within about 1% for the LCL height under normal atmospheric conditions, but requires knowing the dew-point temperature.

== See also ==
- Atmospheric convection
- Atmospheric thermodynamics

== Related reading ==
- Bohren, C.F., and B. Albrecht, Atmospheric Thermodynamics, Oxford University Press, 1998. ISBN 0-19-509904-4
- M K Yau and R.R. Rogers, Short Course in Cloud Physics, Third Edition, published by Butterworth-Heinemann, January 1, 1989, 304 pages. ISBN 9780750632157 ISBN 0-7506-3215-1
