= Forensic meteorology =

Forensic meteorology is meteorology, the scientific study of weather, applied to the process of reconstructing weather events for a certain time and location. This is done by acquiring and analyzing local weather reports such as surface observations, radar and satellite images, other data, and eyewitness accounts. Forensic meteorology is most often used in court cases, including insurance disputes, personal injury cases, and murder investigations. This is most often the case when weather conditions were a possible factor, as in falldowns after snow and ice, wind, flooding, after aviation and nautical accidents, etc. With increasing losses from severe weather in recent years, the demand for forensic meteorological services has also grown. In the US, many forensic meteorologists are certified by the American Meteorological Society (AMS)'s rigorous Certified Consulting Meteorologist (CCM) program.

== Origin of the term ==
Conrad B. Gosset, MS (Meteor), a consulting meteorologist who worked to settle legal claims before trial and who often testified in courtrooms as an expert witness, felt that meteorologists who were providing these services should have a professional name. He introduced the phrase “Forensic Meteorologist” in the mid-1960s, as he discussed in his unpublished keynote speech at the first Conference on Forensic Meteorology, November 5–6, 1976. The conference was held in New Orleans in conjunction with the annual conference of the American Meteorological Society. The first use of the term by The New York Times was in reference to Mr. Gosset's work in a 1982 article.

== See also ==
- Forensic astronomy
- Forensic engineering
- Forensic geology and forensic geophysics
- Forensic palynology
- Forensic science
