= Near-surface geophysics =

Geophysics of first tens of meters below surface

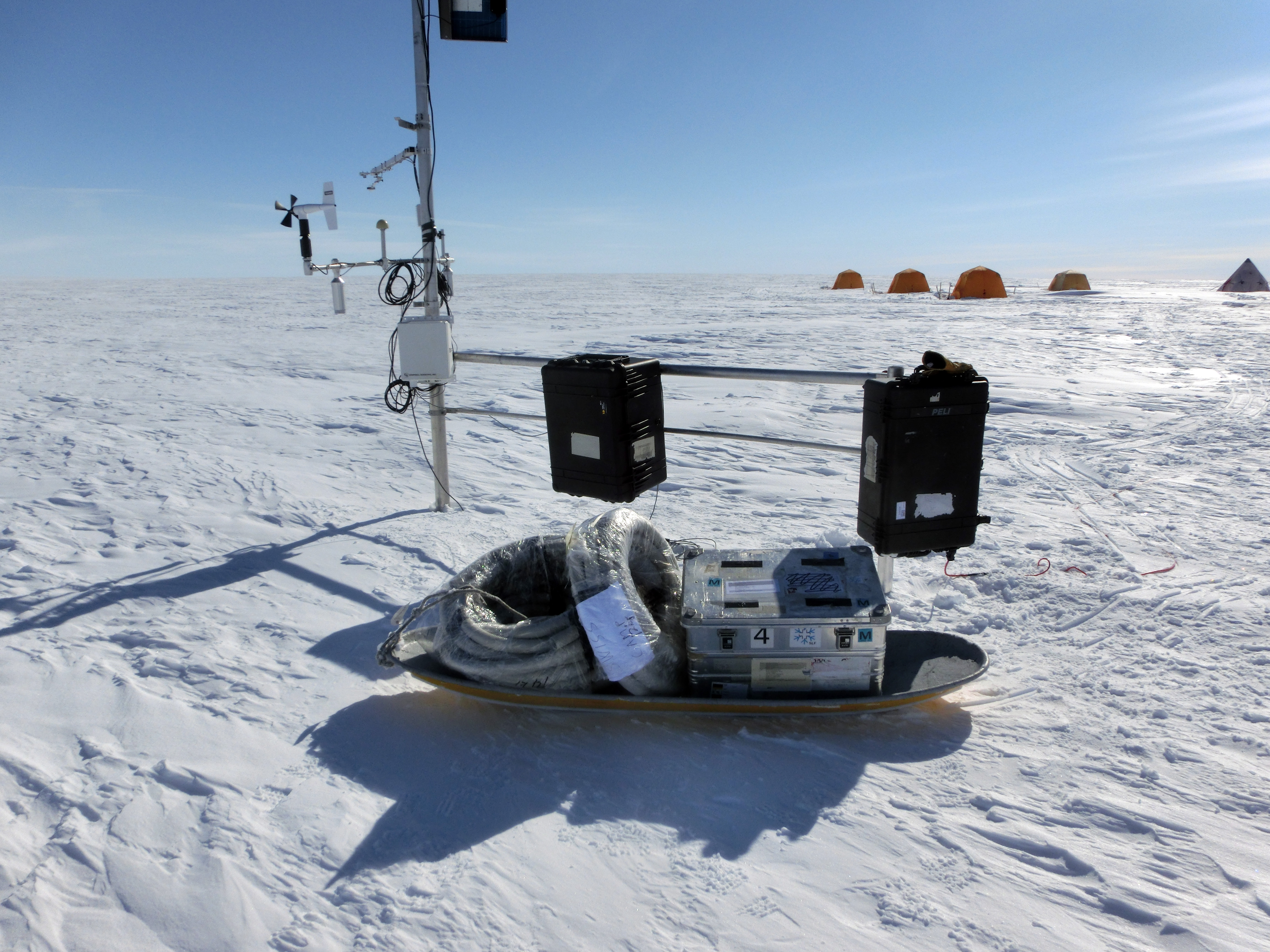
Automatic ground penetrating Radar (upGPR) near Swiss Camp (Greenland)

Near-surface geophysics is the use of geophysical methods to investigate small-scale features in the shallow (tens of meters) subsurface. It is closely related to applied geophysics or exploration geophysics. Methods used include seismic refraction and reflection, gravity, magnetic, electric, and electromagnetic methods. Many of these methods were developed for oil and mineral exploration but are now used for a great variety of applications, including archaeology, environmental science, forensic science, military intelligence, geotechnical investigation, treasure hunting, and hydrogeology. In addition to the practical applications, near-surface geophysics includes the study of biogeochemical cycles.

== Overview ==
In studies of the solid Earth, the main feature that distinguishes geophysics from geology is that it involves remote sensing. Various physical phenomena are used to probe below the surface where scientists cannot directly access the rock. Applied geophysics projects typically have the following elements: data acquisition, data reduction, data processing, modeling, and geological interpretation.

This all requires various types of geophysical surveys. These may include surveys of gravity, magnetism, seismicity, or magnetotellurics.

=== Data acquisition ===
A geophysical survey is a set of measurements made with a geophysical instrument. Often a set of measurements are along a line, or traverse. Many surveys have a set of parallel traverses and another set perpendicular to it to get good spatial coverage. Technologies used for geophysical surveys include:

- Seismic methods, such as reflection seismology, seismic refraction, and seismic tomography.
- Seismoelectrical method
- Geodesy and gravity techniques, including gravimetry and gravity gradiometry.
- Magnetic techniques, including aeromagnetic surveys and magnetometers.
- Electrical techniques, including electrical resistivity tomography, induced polarization and spontaneous potential.
- Electromagnetic methods, such as magnetotellurics, ground penetrating radar and transient/time-domain electromagnetics.
- Borehole geophysics, also called well logging.
- Remote sensing techniques, including hyperspectral imaging.

=== Data reduction ===
The raw data from a geophysical survey must often be converted to a more useful form. This may involve correcting the data for unwanted variations; for example, a gravity survey would be corrected for surface topography. Seismic travel times would be converted to depths. Often a target of the survey will be revealed as an anomaly, a region that has data values above or below the surrounding region.

=== Data processing ===
The reduced data may not provide a good enough image because of background noise. The signal-to-noise ratio may be improved by repeated measurements of the same quantity followed by some sort of averaging such as stacking or signal processing.

=== Modeling ===
Once a good profile is obtained of the physical property that is directly measured, it must be converted to a model of the property that is being investigated. For example, gravity measurements are used to obtain a model of the density profile under the surface. This is called an inverse problem. Given a model of the density, the gravity measurements at the surface can be predicted; but in an inverse problem the gravity measurements are known and the density must be inferred. This problem has uncertainties due to the noise and limited coverage of the surface, but even with perfect coverage many possible models of the interior could fit the data. Thus, additional assumptions must be made to constrain the model.

Depending on the data coverage, the model may only be a 2D model of a profile. Or a set of parallel transects may be interpreted using a 2½D model, which assumes that relevant features are elongated. For more complex features, a 3D model may be obtained using tomography.

=== Geological interpretation ===
The final step in a project is the geological interpretation. A positive gravity anomaly may be an igneous intrusion, a negative anomaly a salt dome or void. A region of higher electrical conductivity may have water or galena. For a good interpretation the geophysics model must be combined with geological knowledge of the area.

== Seismology ==
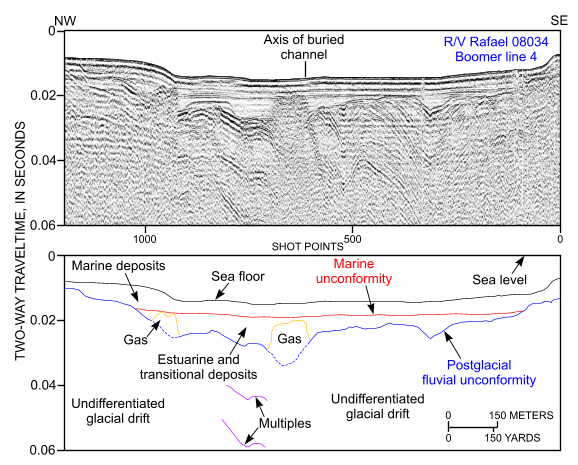
Upper figure: a seismic profile showing intensity vs round-trip travel time. Lower figure: an interpretation of the results.

Seismology makes use of the ability of vibrations to travel through rock as seismic waves. These waves come in two types: pressure waves (P-waves) and shear waves (S-waves). P-waves travel faster than S-waves, and both have trajectories that bend as the wave speeds change with depth. Refraction seismology makes use of these curved trajectories. In addition, if there are discontinuities between layers in the rock or sediment, seismic waves are reflected. Reflection seismology identifies these layer boundaries by the reflections.

=== Reflection seismology ===
Seismic reflection is used for imaging of nearly horizontal layers in the Earth. The method is much like echo sounding. It can be used to identify folding and faulting, and to search for oil and gas fields. On a regional scale, profiles can be combined to get sequence stratigraphy, making it possible to date sedimentary layers and identify eustatic sea level rise.

=== Refraction seismology ===
Seismic refraction can be used not only to identify layers in rocks by the trajectories of the seismic waves, but also to infer the wave speeds in each layer, thereby providing some information on the material in each layer.

== Magnetic surveying ==
Magnetic surveying can be done on a planetary scale (for example, the survey of Mars by the Mars Global Surveyor) or on a scale of meters. In the near-surface, it is used to map geological boundaries and faults, find certain ores, buried igneous dykes, locating buried pipes and old mine workings, and detecting some kinds of land mines. It is also used to look for human artifacts. Magnetometers are used to search for anomalies produced by targets with a lot of magnetically hard material such as ferrites.

== Microgravity surveying ==
High precision gravity measurements can be used to detect near surface density anomalies, such as those associated with sinkholes and old mine workings, with repeat monitoring allowing near-surface changes over these to be quantified.

== Ground-penetrating radar ==
Ground-penetrating radar is one of the most popularly used near-surface geophysics in forensic archaeology, forensic geophysics, geotechnical investigation, treasure hunting, and hydrogeology, with typical penetration depths down to 10 m (33 ft) below ground level, depending upon local soil and rock conditions, although this depends upon the central frequency transmitter/receiver antennae utilised.

== Bulk ground conductivity ==
Bulk ground conductivity typically uses transmitter/receiver pairs to obtain primary/secondary EM signals from the surrounding environment (note potential difficulty in urban areas with above-ground EM sources of interference), with collection areas depending upon the antennae spacing and equipment used. There are airborne, land- and water-based systems currently available. They are particularly useful for initial ground reconnaissance work in geotechnical, archaeology and forensic geophysics investigations.

== Electrical resistivity ==
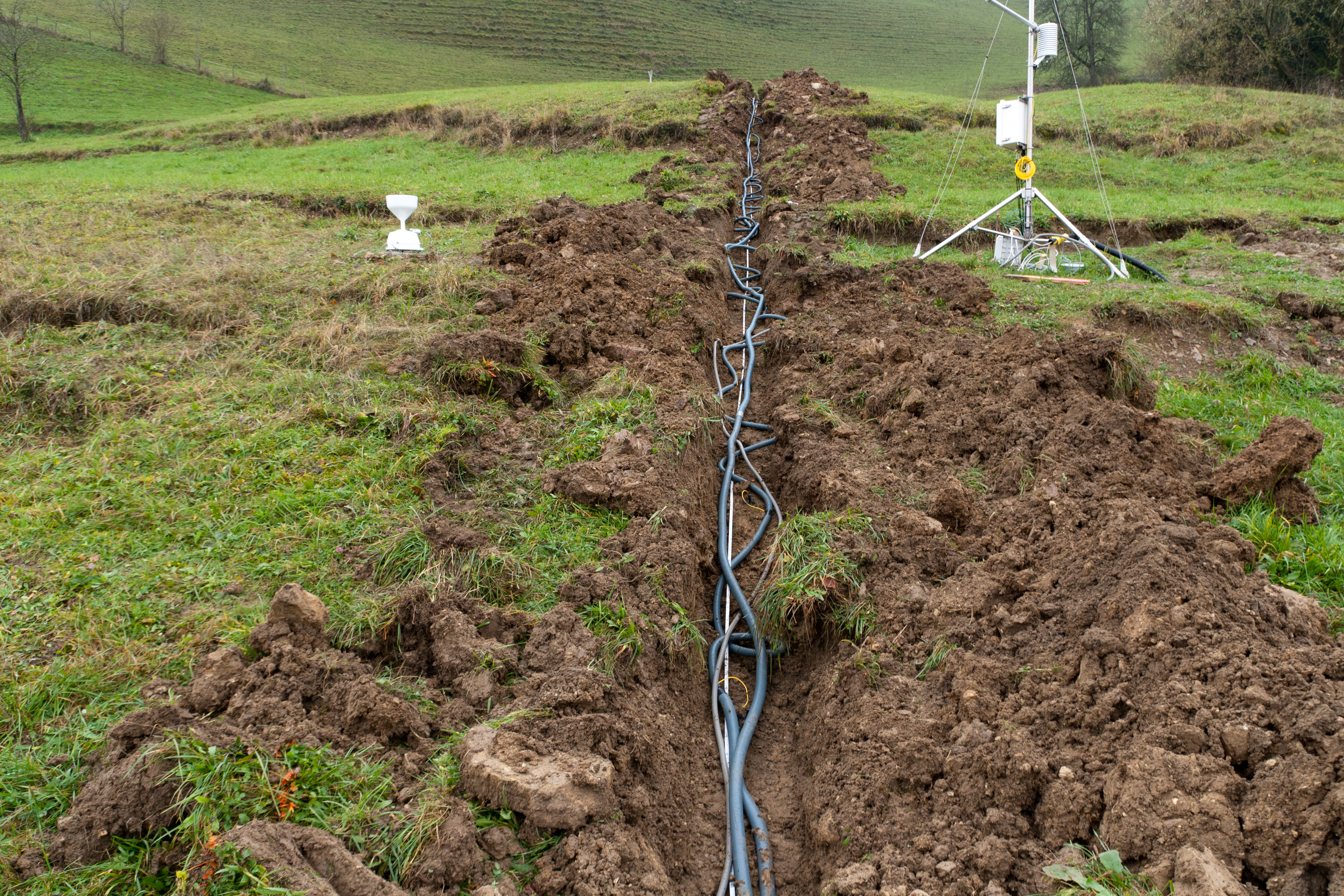
Electrical resistivity tomography profile

The reciprocal of conductivity, electrical resistivity surveys measure the resistance of material (usually soil) between electrical probes, with typical penetration depths one to two times the electrode separations. There are various electrode configurations of equipment, the most typical using two current and two potential electrodes in a dipole-dipole array. They are used for geotechnical, archaeology and forensic geophysics investigations and have better resolution than most conductivity surveys. They do experience significant changes with soil moisture content, a difficulty in most site investigations with heterogeneous ground and differing vegetation distributions.

== Applications ==
Milsom & Eriksen (2011) provide a useful field book for field geophysics.

=== Archaeology ===
Geophysical methods can be used to find or map an archaeological site remotely, avoiding unnecessary digging. They can also be used to date artifacts.

In surveys of a potential archaeological site, features cut into the ground (such as ditches, pits and postholes) may be detected, even after filled in, by electrical resistivity and magnetic methods. The infill may also be detectable using ground-penetrating radar. Foundations and walls may also have a magnetic or electrical signature. Furnaces, fireplaces and kilns may have a strong magnetic anomaly because a thermoremanent magnetization has been baked into magnetic minerals.

Geophysical methods were extensively used in recent work on the submerged remains of ancient Alexandria as well as three nearby submerged cities (Herakleion, Canopus and Menouthis). Methods that included side-scan sonar, magnetic surveys and seismic profiles uncovered a story of bad site location and a failure to protect buildings against geohazards. In addition, they helped to locate structures that may be the lost Great Lighthouse and palace of Cleopatra, although these claims are contested.

=== Forensics ===
Forensic geophysics is increasingly being used to detect near-surface objects/materials related to either a criminal or civil investigation. The most high-profile objects in criminal investigations are clandestine burials of murder victims, but forensic geophysics can also include locating unmarked burials in graveyards and cemeteries, a weapon used in a crime, or buried drugs or money stashes. Civil investigations are more often trying to determine the location, amount and (more tricky) the timing of illegally dumped waste, which include physical (e.g. fly-tipping) and liquid contaminants (e.g. hydrocarbons). There are many geophysical methods that could be employed, depending upon the target and background host materials. Most commonly ground-penetrating radar is used but this may not always be an optimal search detection technique.

=== Geotechnical investigations ===
Geotechnical investigations use near-surface geophysics as a standard tool, both for initial site characterisation and to gauge where to subsequently undertake intrusive site investigation (S.I.) which involves boreholes and trial pits. In rural areas conventional SI methods may be employed but in urban areas or in difficult sites, targeted geophysical techniques can rapidly characterise a site for follow-up, intensive surface or near-surface investigative methods. Most common is searching for buried utilities and still-active cables, cleared building foundations, determining soil type(s) and bedrock depth below ground level, solid/liquid waste contamination, mineshafts and relict mines below ground locations and even differing ground conditions. Indoor geophysical investigations have even been undertaken. Techniques vary depending upon the target and host materials as mentioned.

== Bibliography ==
- Butler, Dwain K. (2005). Near-surface geophysics. Investigations in geophysics series no. 13. Society of Exploration Geophysicists. ISBN 978-1-56080-130-6.
- Lawler, Andrew (2005). "Ancient Alexandria Emerges, By Land and By Sea" (PDF). Science. 307 (5713): 1192–1194. doi:10.1126/science.307.5713.1192a. PMID 15731421. S2CID 178178452.
- Mussett, Alan E.; Khan, M. Aftab (2000). Looking into the Earth: An introduction to Geological Geophysics. Cambridge University Press. ISBN 978-0-521-78085-8.
- Parasnis, D. S. (1997). Principles of Applied Geophysics. Chapman & Hall. ISBN 978-0-412-64080-3.
- Parker, Robert L. (1994). Geophysical Inverse Theory. Princeton University Press. ISBN 978-0-691-03634-2.
- Slater, L.; Knight, R.; Singha, K.; Binley, A.; Atekwana, E. (2006). "Near-surface geophysics: A new focus group". Eos, Transactions, American Geophysical Union. 87 (25): 249. Bibcode:2006EOSTr..87..249S. doi:10.1029/2006EO250008.
- Stanley, Jean-Daniel; Goddio, Franck; Jorstad, Thomas F.; Schnepp, Gerard (2004). "Submergence of Ancient Greek Cities Off Egypt's Nile Delta—A Cautionary Tale". GSA Today. 14 (1): 4–10. doi:10.1130/1052-5173(2004)014<4:SOAGCO>2.0.CO;2.
- Telford, William Murray; Geldart, L. P.; Sheriff, Robert E. (1990). Applied Geophysics. Cambridge University Press. ISBN 978-0-521-33938-4.
