= Inversion (meteorology) =

Deviation from the normal change of an atmospheric property with altitude

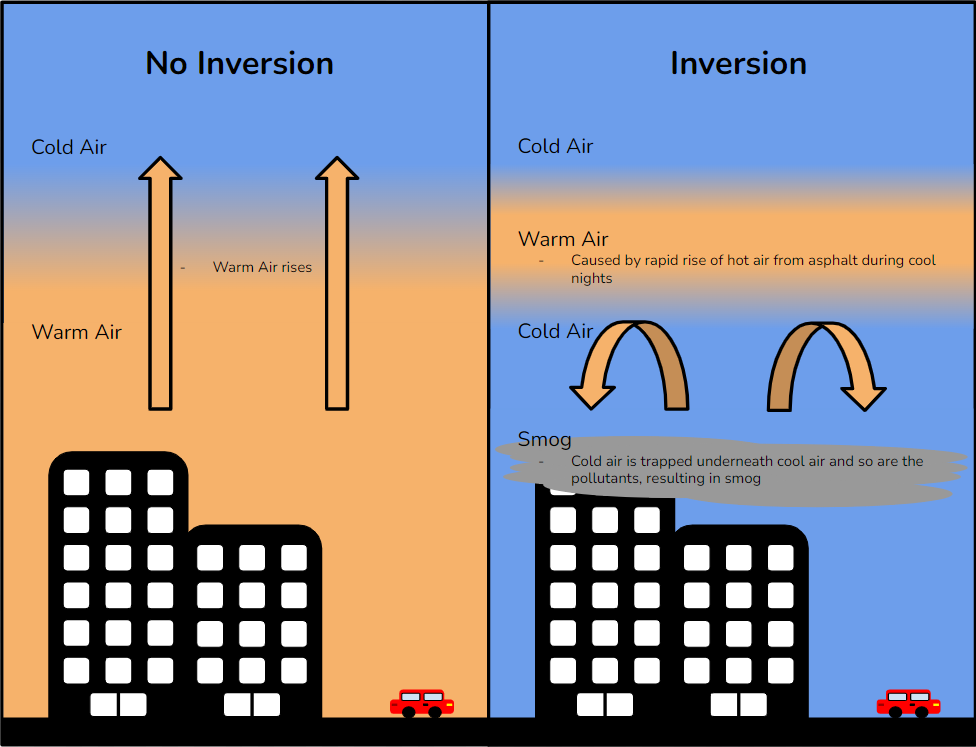
Temperature inversion in an urban environment

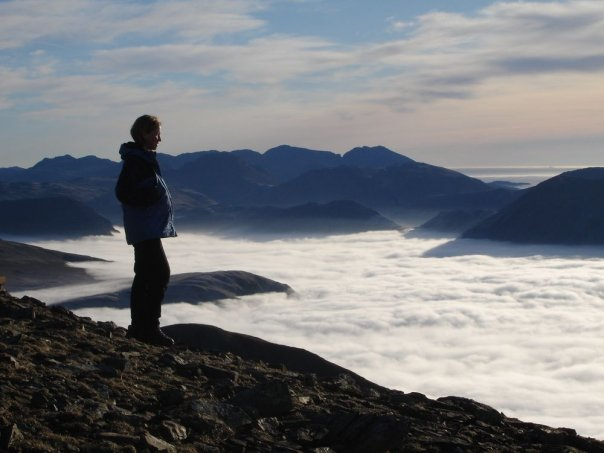
Temperature inversion in the Lake District, England, forms clouds at a low level under clearer air.

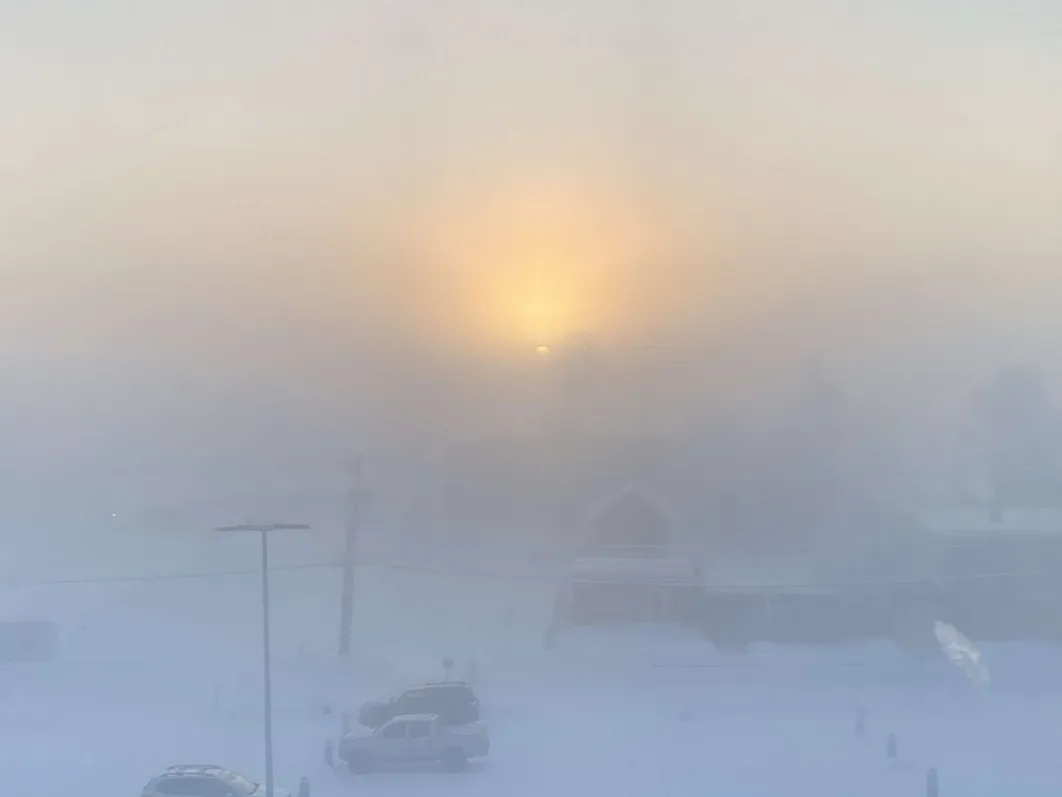
Ice fog caused by a temperature inversion in downtown Fairbanks, Alaska in January 2025.

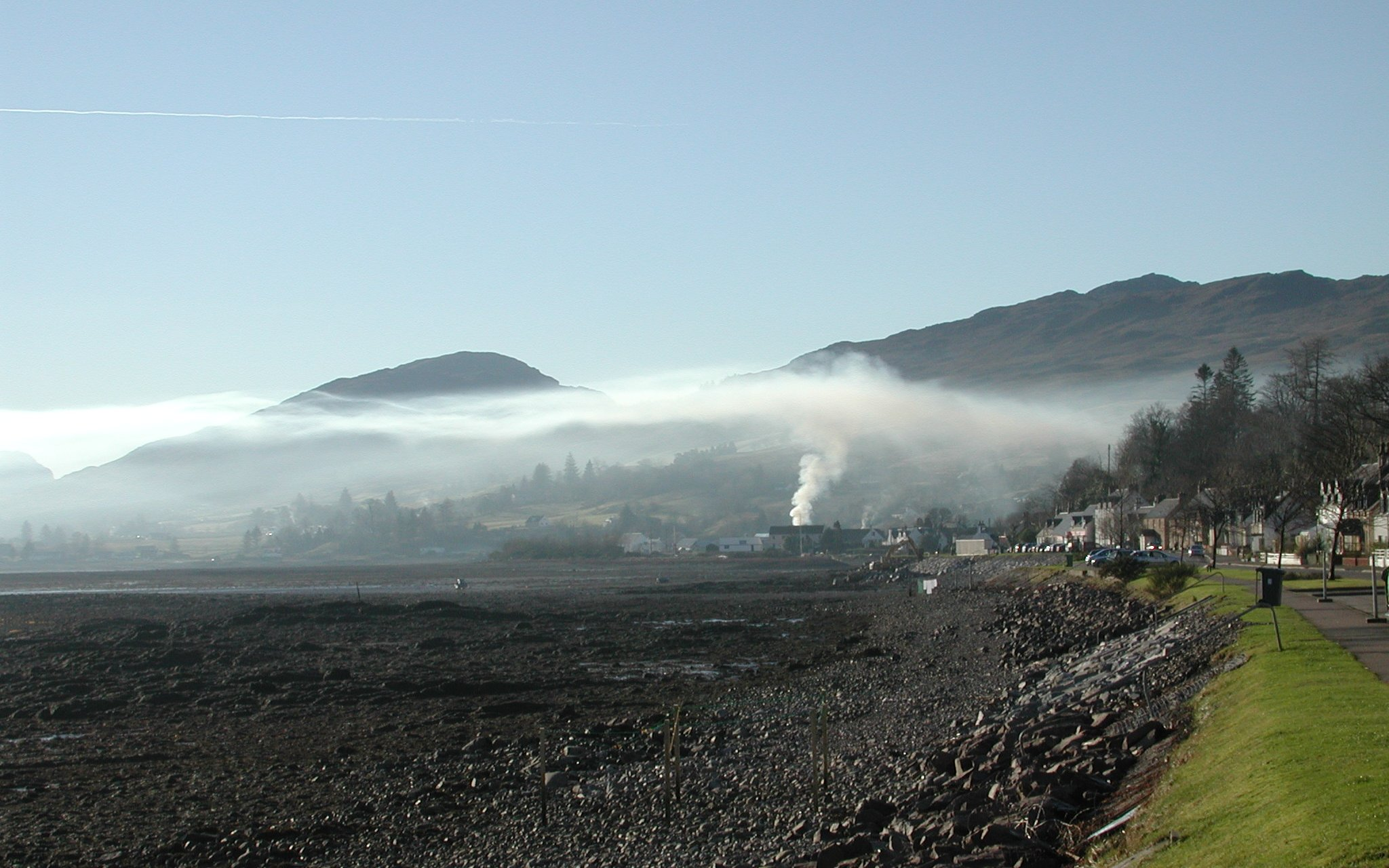
Smoke rising in Lochcarron, Scotland, is stopped by an overlying layer of warmer air (2006).

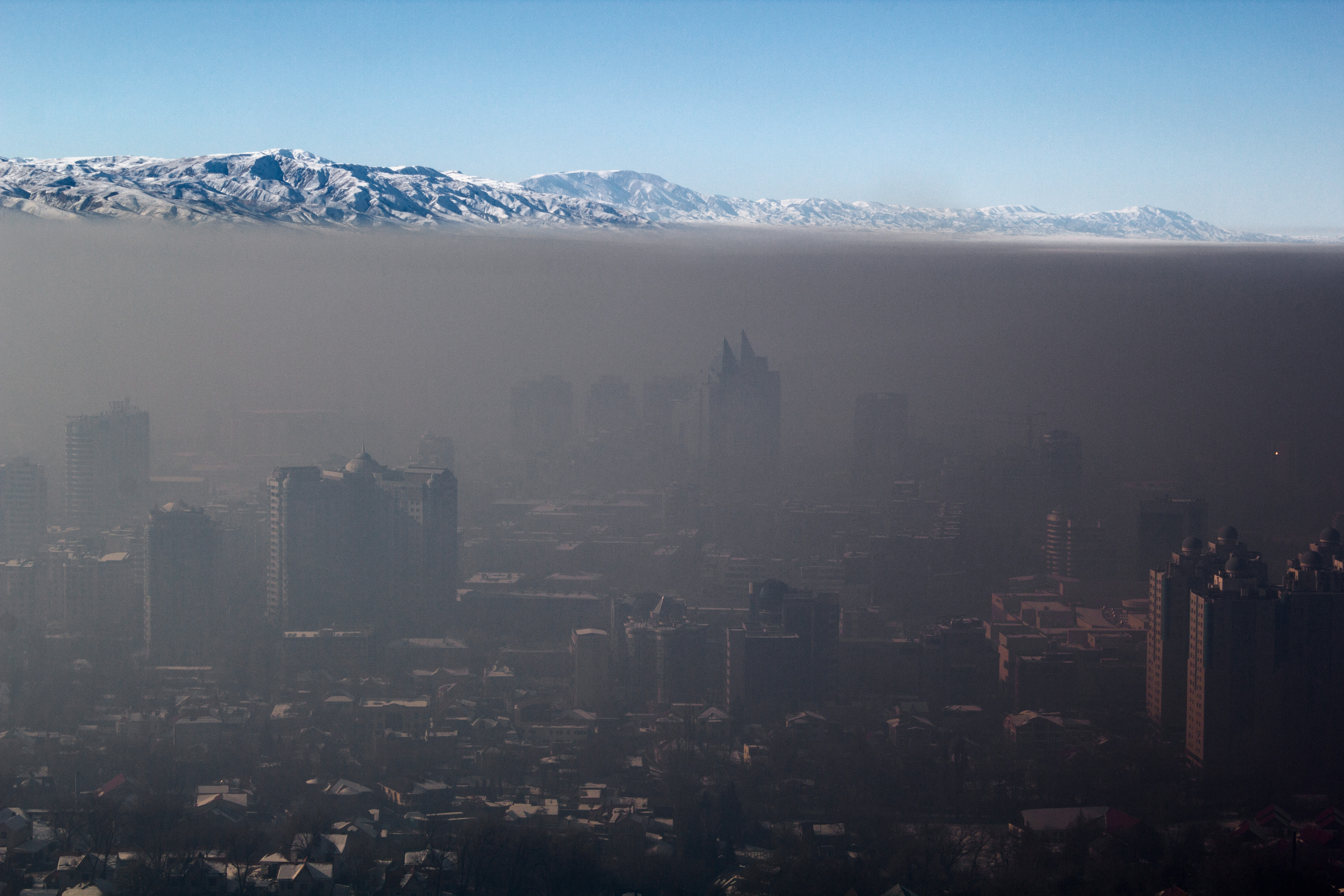
Smog trapped over the city of Almaty, Kazakhstan during a temperature inversion.

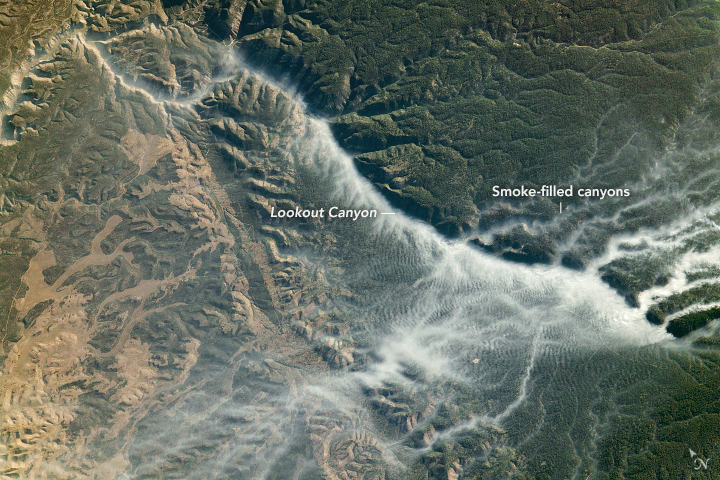
Smoke-filled canyons in northern Arizona, 2019. During morning and evening hours, dense smoke often settles in low-lying areas and becomes trapped due to temperature inversions—when a layer within the lower atmosphere acts as a lid and prevents vertical mixing of the air. Steep canyon walls act as a horizontal barrier, concentrating the smoke within the deepest parts of the canyon and increasing the strength of the inversion.

In meteorology, an inversion (or temperature inversion) is a phenomenon in which a layer of warmer air overlies cooler air. Normally, in the troposphere, Earth's lowest atmospheric layer, with which meteorology is chiefly concerned, air temperature gradually decreases as altitude increases, but this relationship is reversed in an inversion.

An inversion traps air pollution, such as smog, near the ground. An inversion can also suppress convection by acting as a "cap". If this cap is broken for any of several reasons, convection of any humidity can then erupt into violent thunderstorms. Temperature inversion can cause freezing rain in cold climates.

== Normal atmospheric conditions ==
Usually, within the lower atmosphere (the troposphere) the air near the surface of the Earth is warmer than the air above it, largely because the atmosphere is heated from below as solar radiation warms the Earth's surface, which in turn then warms the layer of the atmosphere directly above it, e.g., by thermals (convective heat transfer). Air temperature also decreases with an increase in altitude because higher air is at lower pressure, and lower pressure results in a lower temperature, following the ideal gas law and adiabatic lapse rate.

== Description ==
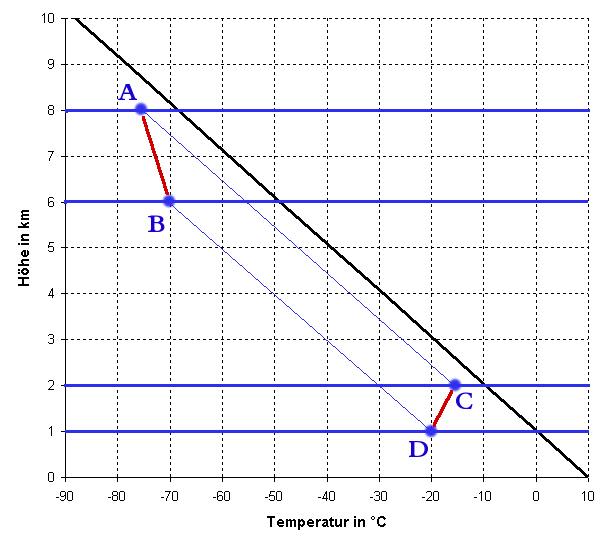
Height (y-axis) versus temperature (x-axis) under normal atmospheric conditions (black line). When the layer from 6–8 kilometres (4–5 miles) (designated A-B) descends dry adiabatically, the result is the inversion seen near the ground at 1–2 kilometres (1–1 mile) (C-D).

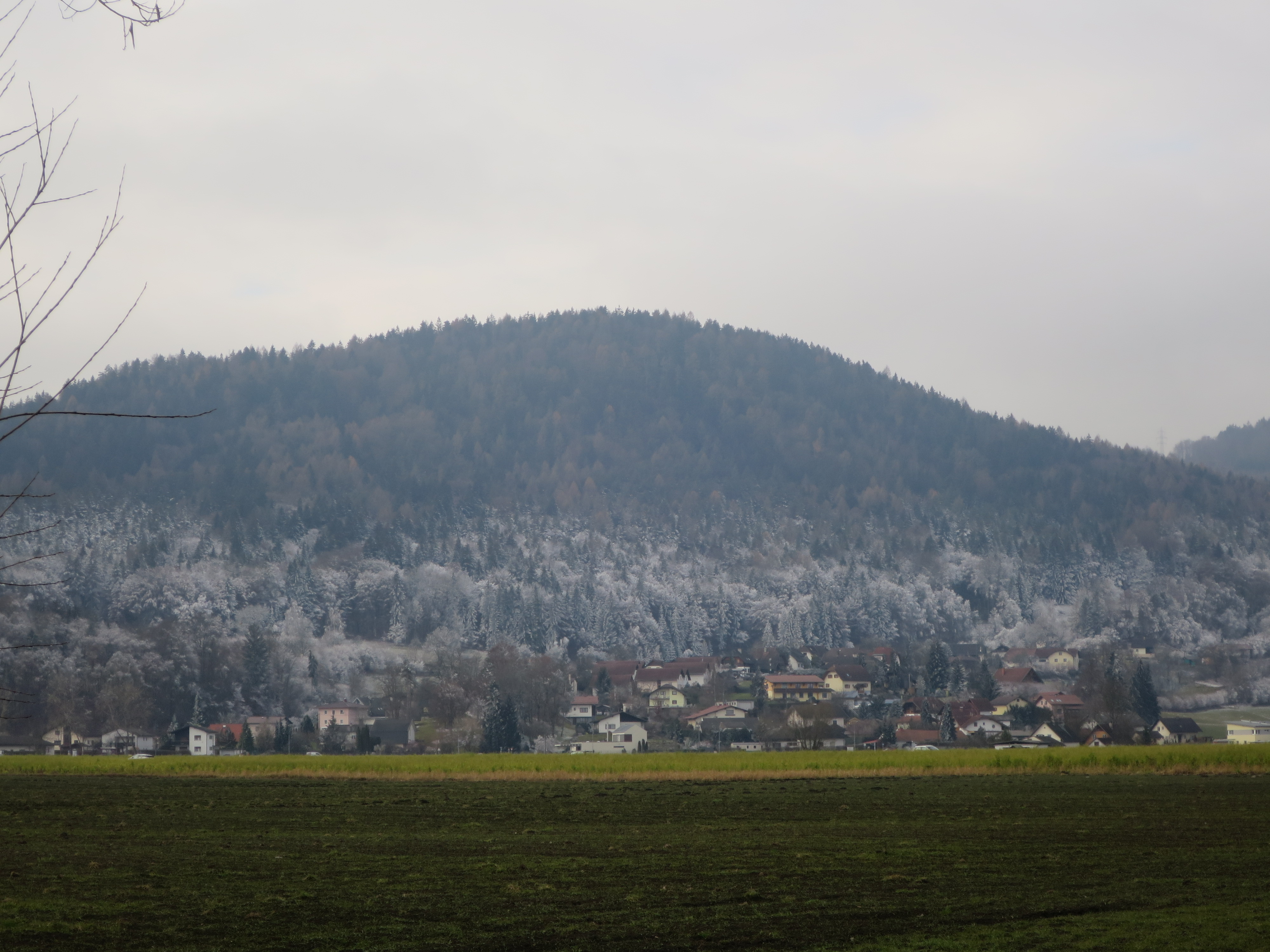
Klagenfurter Becken (Austria) in December 2015: on Mount Goritschnigkogel there is a distinct inverse hoarfrost margin.

Under the right conditions, the normal vertical temperature gradient is inverted so that the air is colder near the surface of the Earth. This can occur when, for example, a warmer, less-dense air mass moves over a cooler, denser air mass. This type of inversion occurs in the vicinity of warm fronts, and also in areas of oceanic upwelling such as along the California coast in the United States. With sufficient humidity in the cooler layer, fog is typically present below the inversion cap. An inversion is also produced whenever radiation from the surface of the earth exceeds the amount of radiation received from the sun, which commonly occurs at night, or during the winter when the sun is very low in the sky. This effect is virtually confined to land regions as the ocean retains heat far longer. In the polar regions during winter, inversions are nearly always present over land. An example of this is the town of Fairbanks, Alaska, which in December 2025 experienced a prolonged inversion that led to the town's eighth coldest December on record. Temperatures in Fairbanks remained over 20 degrees below normal for nearly the entire month.

A warmer air mass moving over a cooler one can "shut off" any convection which may be present in the cooler air mass: this is known as a capping inversion. However, if this cap is broken, either by extreme convection overcoming the cap or by the lifting effect of a front or a mountain range, the sudden release of bottled-up convective energy—like the bursting of a balloon—can result in severe thunderstorms. Such capping inversions typically precede the development of tornadoes in the Midwestern United States. In this instance, the "cooler" layer is quite warm but is still denser and usually cooler than the lower part of the inversion layer capping it.

== Subsidence inversion ==
An inversion can develop aloft as a result of air gradually sinking over a wide area and being warmed by adiabatic compression, usually associated with subtropical high-pressure areas. A stable marine layer may then develop over the ocean as a result. As this layer moves over progressively warmer waters, however, turbulence within the marine layer can gradually lift the inversion layer to higher altitudes, and eventually even pierce it, producing thunderstorms, and under the right circumstances, tropical cyclones. The accumulated smog and dust under the inversion quickly taints the sky reddish, easily seen on sunny days.

== Atmospheric consequences ==
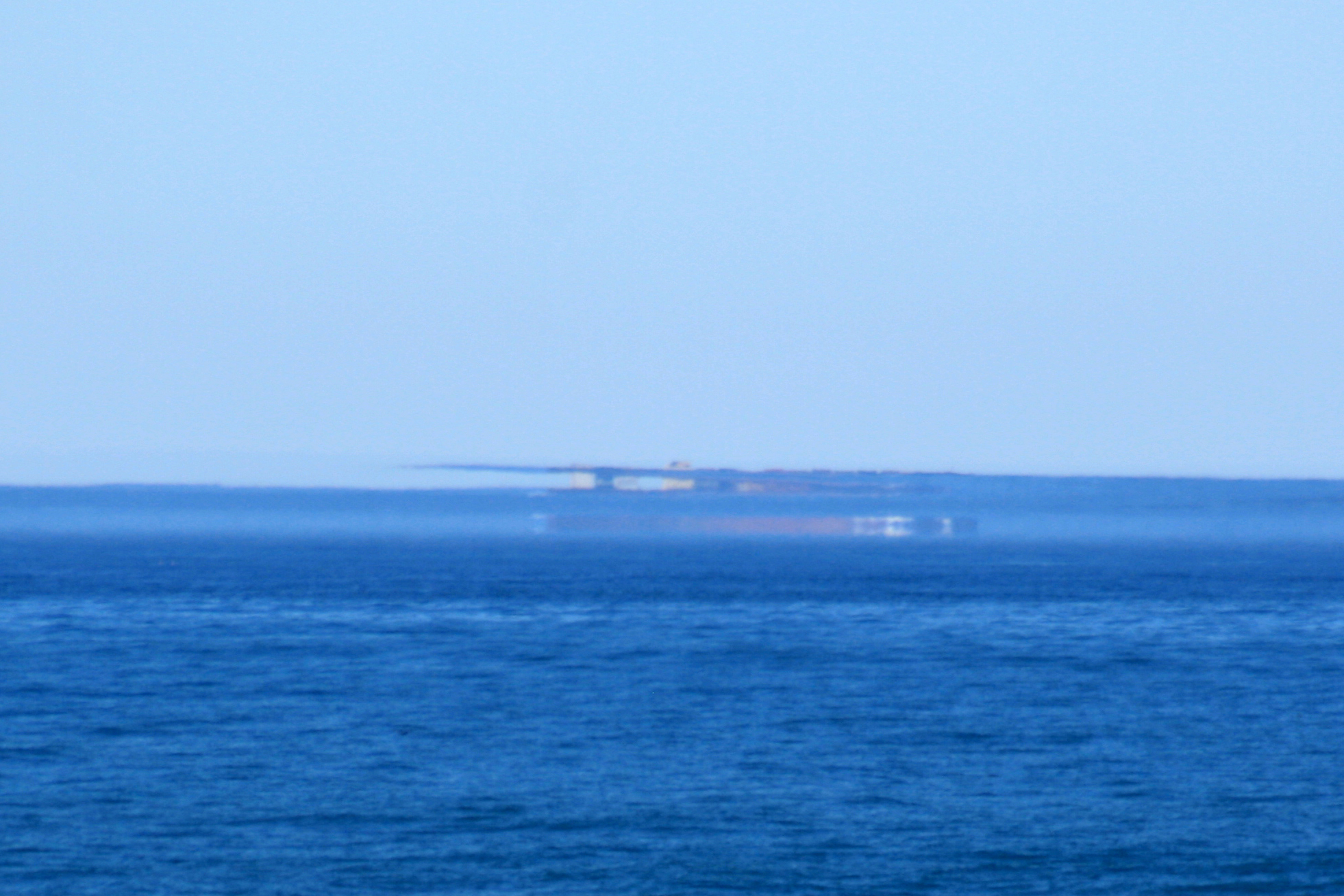
A Fata Morgana (or mirage) of a ship is due to an inversion (2008).

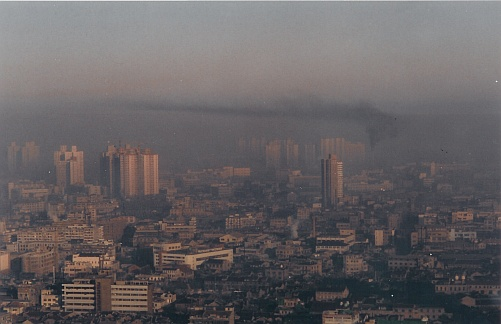
Winter smoke in Shanghai, China, with a clear border-layer for the vertical air-spread (1993).

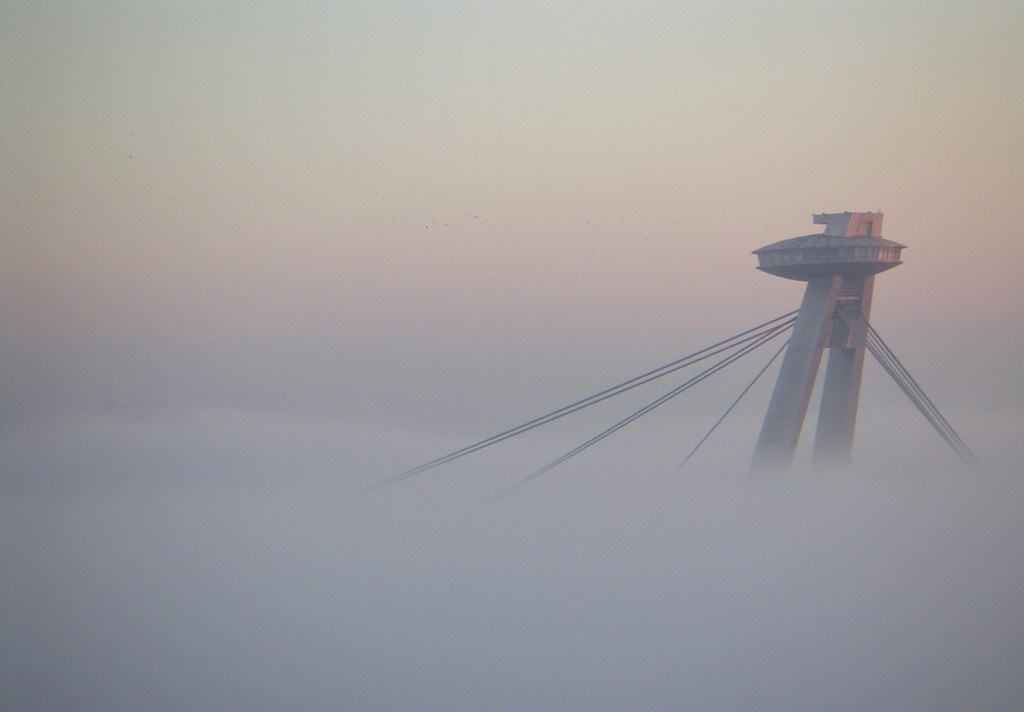
A temperature inversion in Bratislava, Slovakia, viewing the top of Nový Most (2005).

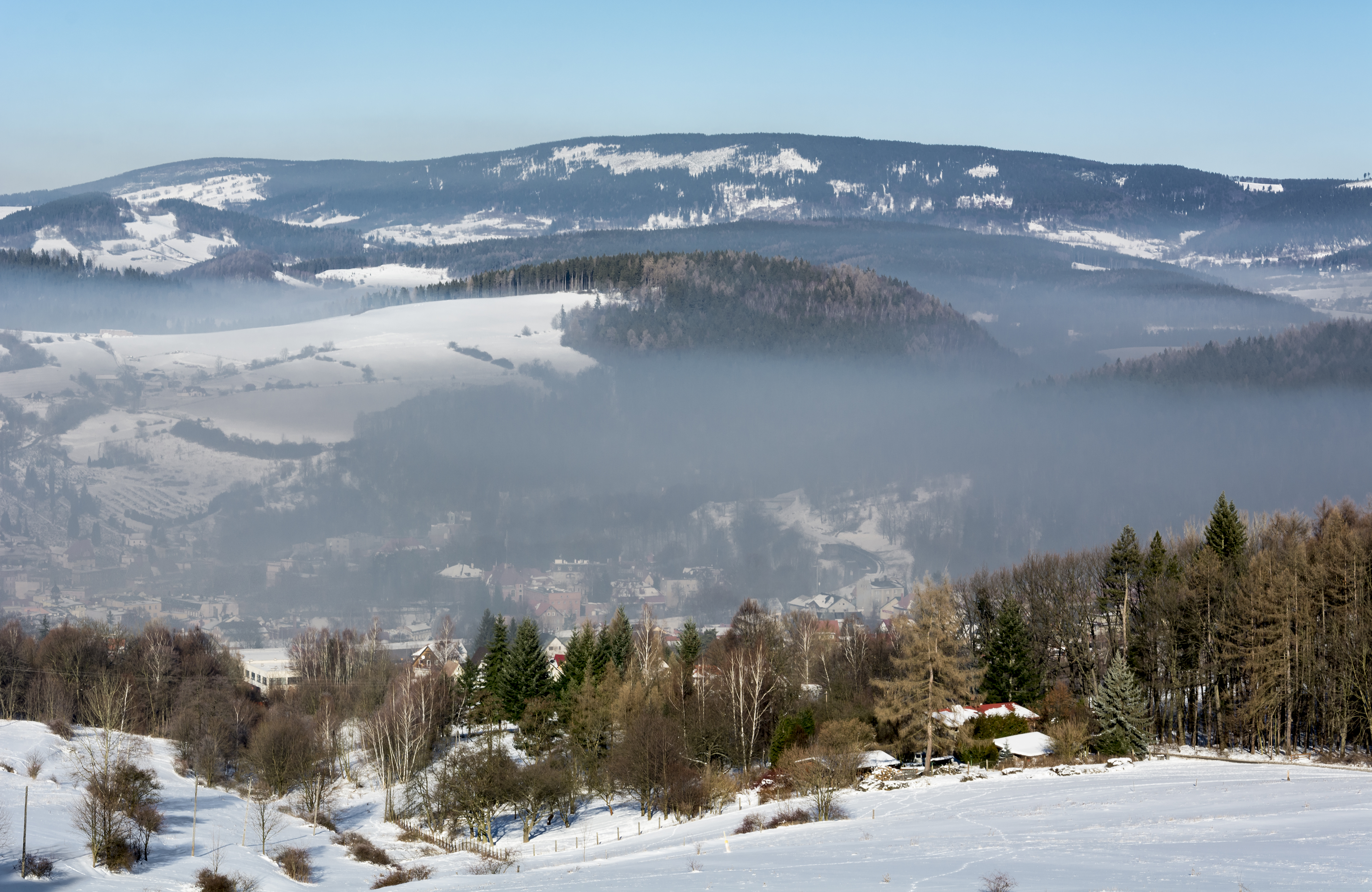
Inversion-created smog in Nowa Ruda, Poland, 2017

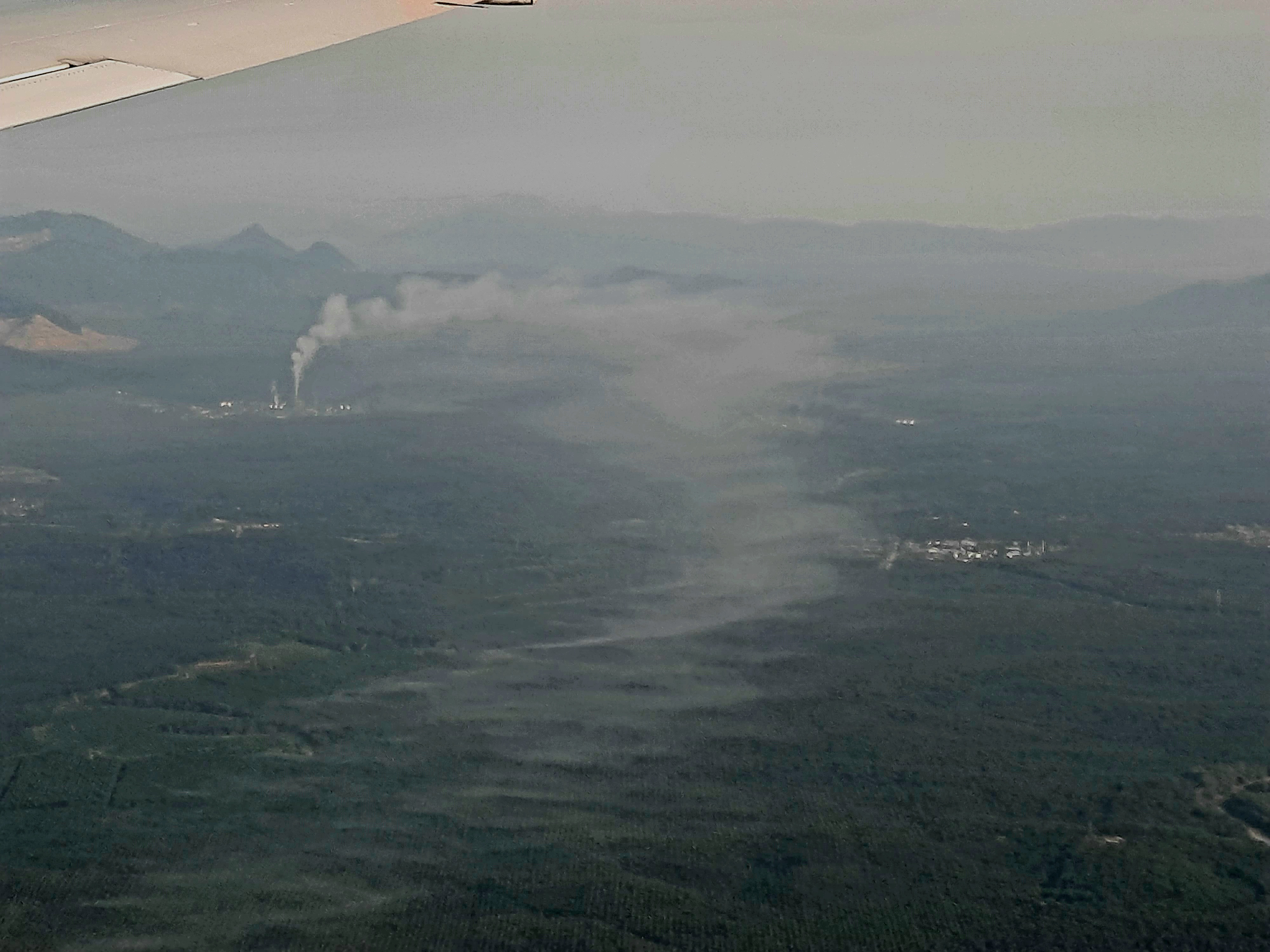
Temperature inversion phenomenon in the early morning near Tawau, Sabah, Malaysia where smoke that was emitted from an oil palm mill stayed close to the ground. The wind carried the smoke in the direction of the nearby settlement to the middle-right of the photo (August 2023).

Temperature inversions stop atmospheric convection (which is normally present) from happening in the affected area and can lead to high concentrations of atmospheric pollutants. Cities especially suffer from the effects of temperature inversions because they both produce more atmospheric pollutants and have higher thermal masses than rural areas, resulting in more frequent inversions with higher concentrations of pollutants. The effects are even more pronounced when a city is surrounded by hills or mountains since they form an additional barrier to air circulation. During a severe inversion, trapped air pollutants form a brownish haze that can cause respiratory problems. Temperature inversions create stable atmospheric stratification that inhibits vertical mixing between air near the surface and the air above it, allowing pollutants to accumulate near the ground; this effect is often more pronounced in valleys, basins, or areas surrounded by mountains, where terrain further restricts airflow and promotes the retention of cold air and pollutants near the surface. The Great Smog of 1952 in London, England, is one of the most serious examples of such an inversion. It was blamed for an estimated 10,000 to 12,000 deaths.

Sometimes the inversion layer is at a high enough altitude that cumulus clouds can condense but can only spread out under the inversion layer. This decreases the amount of sunlight reaching the ground and prevents new thermals from forming. As the clouds disperse, sunny weather replaces cloudiness in a cycle that can occur more than once a day.

In winter, an inversion can lead to the development of ice pellets and freezing rain. Both these phenomena occur when snow melts in a warm layer aloft and falls into a colder layer near the surface. If the layer of cold air near the surface is thick enough, it will lead to the development of ice pellets as the raindrops re-freeze. A shallow layer does not give the raindrops enough time to freeze as they quickly fall through it, leading to the development of freezing rain.

== Wave propagation ==
Mirages due to differing air refractive indices, n

=== Light ===
As the temperature of air increases, the index of refraction of air decreases, a side effect of hotter air being less dense. Normally this results in distant objects being shortened vertically, an effect that is easy to see at sunset when the sun is visible as an oval. In an inversion, the normal pattern is reversed, and distant objects are instead stretched out or appear to be above the horizon, leading to the phenomenon known as a Fata Morgana or mirage.

Inversions can magnify the so-called "green flash"—a phenomenon occurring at sunrise or sunset, usually visible for a few seconds, in which the sun's green light is isolated due to dispersion. The shorter wavelength is refracted most, with the blue component of sunlight "completely scattered out by Rayleigh scattering", making green the first or last light from the upper rim of the solar disc to be seen.

=== Radio waves ===
Very high frequency radio waves can be refracted by inversions, making it possible to hear FM radio or watch VHF low-band television broadcasts from long distances on foggy nights. The signal, which would normally be refracted up and away into space, is instead refracted down towards the earth by the temperature-inversion boundary layer. This phenomenon is called tropospheric ducting. Along coastlines during Autumn and Spring, due to multiple stations being simultaneously present because of reduced propagation losses, many FM radio stations are plagued by severe signal degradation disrupting reception. In higher frequencies such as microwaves, such refraction causes multipath propagation and fading.

=== Sound ===
When an inversion layer is present, if a sound or explosion occurs at ground level, the sound wave is refracted by the temperature gradient (which affects sound speed) and returns to the ground. The sound, therefore, travels much better than normal. This is noticeable in areas around airports, where the sound of aircraft taking off and landing often can be heard at greater distances around dawn than at other times of day, and inversion thunder which is significantly louder and travels further than when it is produced by lightning strikes under normal conditions.

==== Shock waves ====
The shock wave from an explosion can be reflected by an inversion layer in much the same way as it bounces off the ground in an air-burst and can cause additional damage as a result. This phenomenon killed two people in the Soviet RDS-37 nuclear test when a building collapsed.

== See also ==
- Aerosol
- Particulates
- Index of meteorology articles
