= Tsunami PTSD Center =

Nonprofit institution in Bangkok, Thailand

The Tsunami Post Traumatic Stress Disorder (PTSD) Center is a nonprofit institution located in Bangkok, Thailand, committed to the study, treatment and education of PTSD and related mental health issues, many of which are specific to Asia.

The tsunami of December 26, 2004 devastated lives in many ways. In addition to the loss of lives and homes, many people in damaged areas continue to experience the effects of the disaster in the form of widespread psychological trauma.

The Tsunami PTSD Center proposes specifically to address the mental health needs of tsunami-affected areas through clinical research, treatment programs and educational initiatives. These initiatives will be created for health professionals and policy makers, researchers, and the general public.

The objectives of the Tsunami PTSD Center are threefold:

1. Conduct clinical research to determine the best treatment paths and options for patients with PTSD in tsunami-affected areas, and in other areas of Asia affected with mental health issues. A DNA database will continue to be compiled as a mission-critical tool in this effort.
2. Create programs and processes that systematically look at mental health issues such as PTSD from a public health perspective, and that incorporate research results into public health systems in a horizontal and coordinated manner.
3. Educate the general public and healthcare professionals about PTSD and stress-related mental health issues. This initiative involves educating medical professionals and policy makers, educating the public through awareness campaigns and targeted messaging, as well as coordinating information for clinical studies among research professionals.

The Tsunami PTSD Center proposes to accomplish this by working collaboratively with international health organizations, public health ministries, private businesses and academia within Asia and around the world.

The initial partnership platform of the Office of the Prime Minister Thaksin Shinawatra, Thailand Ministry of Public Health, Thailand Department of Mental Health, Chulalongkorn University and the Thailand Center for Excellence in Life Sciences (TCELS) has provided a foundation and seed funding for this project. The Tsunami PTSD Center will actively raise funds from the public and private sectors in order to execute its mission.
