= Certified Consulting Meteorologist =

America professional designation in meteorology

Certified Consulting Meteorologist (CCM) is the title of a person designated by the American Meteorological Society (AMS) and CCM Board to possess the attributes of Knowledge, Experience, and Character as these pertain to the field of meteorology. Announced in 1957, the CCM program is a service for the general public by the AMS to establish high standards for those who provide advice in meteorology to the public. Forensic meteorologists are covered by this title and seal, similar to how broadcasters are recognized by the AMS as Certified Broadcast Meteorologists (CBMs).

The AMS maintains a directory of CCMs.
