= Forensic geology =

Branch of Forensic science

Forensic geology is the study of evidence relating to materials found in the Earth used to answer questions raised by the legal system.

In 1975, Ray Murray and fellow Rutgers University professor John Tedrow published Forensic Geology.

The main use of forensic geology as it is applied today is regarding trace evidence. By examining the soil and sediment particles forensic geologists can potentially link a suspect to a particular crime or a particular crime scene.

Forensic geologists work with many other disciplines of science such as medicine, biology, geography, and engineering amongst others.

In 2008, Alastair Ruffell and Jennifer McKinley, both of Queen's University Belfast, published Geoforensics a book that focuses more on the use of geomorphology and geophysics for searches. In 2010, forensic soil scientist Lorna Dawson of the James Hutton Institute co-edited and contributed chapters to the textbook Criminal and Environmental Soil Forensics. In 2012, Elisa Bergslien, at SUNY Buffalo State, published a general textbook on the topic, An Introduction to Forensic Geoscience.

== Origin of forensic geology ==
According to Murray, forensic geology began with Sherlock Holmes writer, Sir Arthur Conan Doyle. The character Sherlock Holmes claimed to be able to identify where an individual had been by various methods, including his having memorized the exposed geology of London to such a degree that detecting certain clays on a person's shoe would give away a locale. Georg Popp, of Frankfurt, Germany, may have been the first to use soil analysis for linking suspects to a crime scene. In 1891, Hans Gross used microscopic analysis of soils and other materials from a suspect's shoes to link him to the crime scene.

== Physical description ==
=== Colour ===
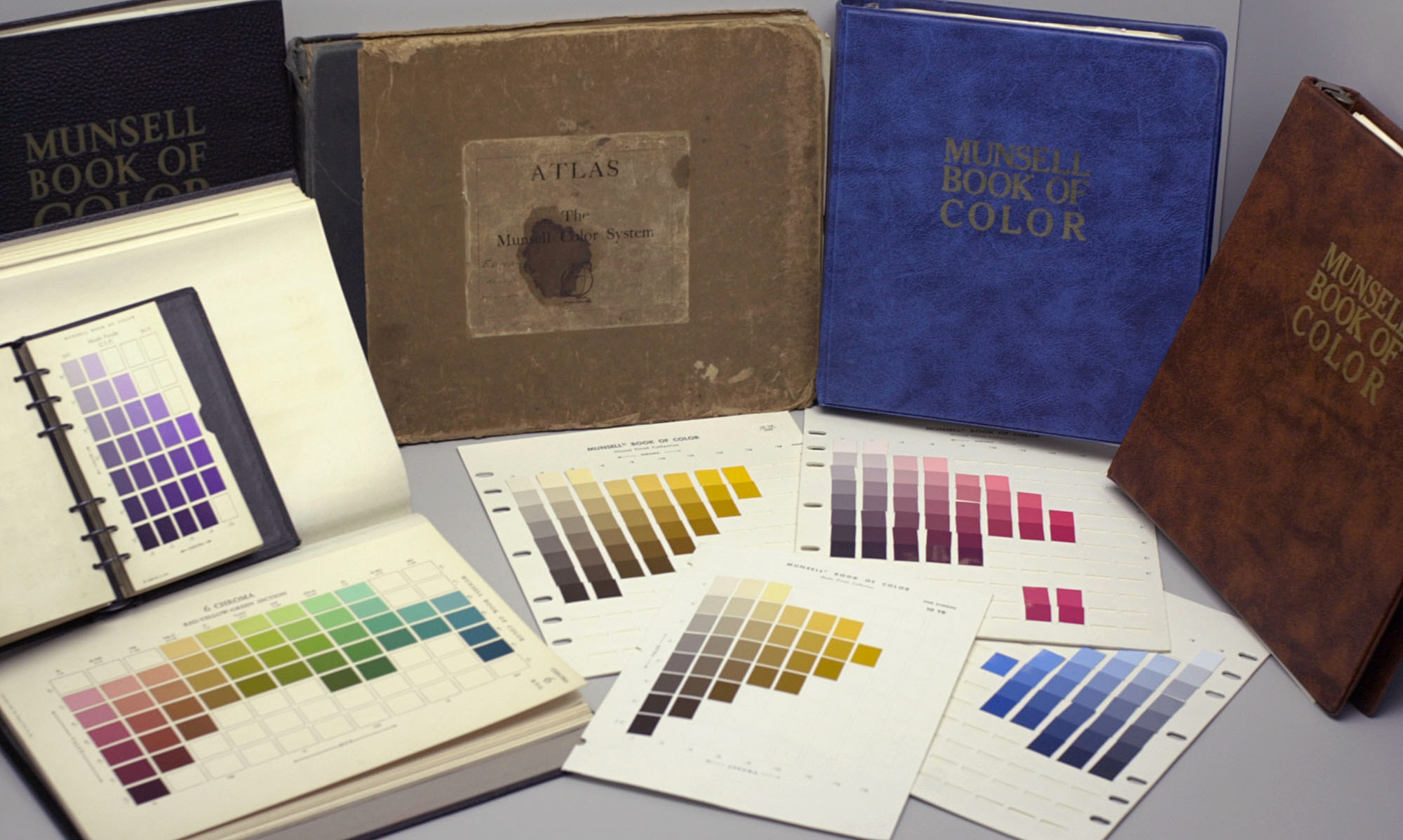
Displaying Munsell Book of colour.

Colour is one of the most important physical characteristics associated with soil samples. One technique used is comparing the soil to the Munsell soil chart. In a majority parts of the world during a forensic investigation determining the soil colour is required. This analysis can be achieved in the field itself with the Munsell soil chart using human perspective. Although colour is a very subjective topic, two people can have a complete different perception of colour and could then associate it differently with the Munsell soil chart thus effecting the accuracy of this method.

To avoid the errors of simply using human perception, to obtain objective results computer controlled spectrophotometry can be used. One computerized method is using CIELAB which consists of using an electronic spectrophotometer and calorimeter to create 3D plotting of colour. Using three coordinates L* relates to a reflection of lightness, a* refers to red/ green colours and b* yellow/ blue colours. This method uses a derivative mathematical system to achieve a uniform colour space for analysis. This technique provides numerical values to be associated with colour to then be using with accordance of the Munsell soil chart.

The most commonly used technique to determine colour of a soil sample has been measuring the colour once the sample has been dried. Although to obtain a more thorough analysis different case studies have taken colour measurements when the soil sample is moist, allowing organic materials to decompose, removing iron oxides, crushing and heating the sample.

=== Density ===
Another physical characteristic used is measuring the density in units of $g/cm^3$or $kg/m^3$. This can be achieved in regards to the particle density or material density, this measurement will vary depending on the specific type of material measured. To determine the weight of the sample in question a simple scale is used. To determine the volume of the sample, if it is a rock being measured, it can be placed in water and be measured by the displacement. In regards to soil sample the same technique is used although the soil sample is placed in a cling film to avoid disintegration. The main use of density of the sample in forensic geology is to obtain the best description of the sample in question.

=== Particle size distributions ===
One of the most discriminating physical characteristics consist of particle size where it is characterized as particle size frequency distributions. This consists of the materials weight, weight %, number of particles present, or the volume. Depending on the sample, different methods can be used such as examination use a microscope, laser diffraction, dry/ wet sieving, computer program analysis and many more.

== Chemical description ==
=== pH ===
pH is the measure of hydrogen activity present and to determine the pH they calculate the level of dissociation of the hydrogen ions. Within the realm of pH it can be associated with acidic, basic or neutral. Although more can be determined with pH such as the elemental composition and the level of essential nutrients and toxicity. It can indicate the presence of many elements such as P, Zn, B, Cu, Fe etc., as well as estimating lime requirement.

In recent years that has been much improvement to portable pH meters that are used in the field. Decades ago the portable devices has numerous malfunctions regarding the electrodes. Nowadays pH meters due to microcircuitry and plastic not only reduces the cost of these devices but also allows for an overall better protection of the unit. Further studies are attempting a technique to produce a device to obtain microsite pH in various soil systems by using plant cells via microprocedures. This would also be able to decipher the different pH present in the soil matrix.

== Evidence collection ==
In the application of forensic geology there are two distinct types of soil samples. The first being the questioned sample, samples of unknown origin. These types of sample can be taken from someones shoe for example. The other type of sample consists of the control sample which the forensic geologist can choose. The most common control sample would be soil taken from the crime scene. The questioned and control sample would then be compared to find similarities or distinction from the two.

Regarding the evidence collection from a questioned sample, these are most likely samples acquired by accident. Such as a suspect obtained soil or rocks in their shoes or pants. The forensic geologist therefor does not chose the size of the questioned sample and most likely will not be comparable in size to the control sample. Depending on the question sample the forensic geologist will have to use professional judgement on the optimal technique to compare it to the control sample. In some situations only loose particles are available for comparison. If the questioned sample is found to be a lump of soil, this lump needs to obtained in its entirety to essentially preserve the different layers of soil in the lump itself as well as the keeping intact the particles. Methods such as using adhesive tape, vacuuming, shaking items over a tarp are also used in the field.

Controlled samples consist of two sub categories samples from the scene itself or an alibi location. Soil samples can differ from a very small distance and is why the questioned sample should be examined first two establish particle size/ colour or any other distinguishable factors to then carefully choose a location at the scene to sample in comparison. Samples obtained from these scenes can also be submitted to the forensic lab with other physical evidence. Depending on the lab, they would have distinct instructions for the collector on how the sample is collected/ submitted. When samples are being taken from the ground it is recommended to take samples from different layers of the soil such as the horizon or the bed layer. It is important to obtain samples that vary on colour, mineral composition and textures.

The tools used to collect evidence depend on type of sample either questioned or control as well as its structure and size. Smaller quantities of soil can be retrieved using forceps, tweezers, palette knives etc. When attempting to remove soil that is stuck to a surface an ice pick, razor blade or anything with a flat surface is sufficient. Control samples are normally larger thus requiring the implementation of a larger tool such as a garden shovel. When taking a soil sample from the ground normally just the surface is being sampled. Need to assure the samples are allowed to dry before collection, moist samples will still allow further biological material will be modified changing the overall composition of the sample. Dry samples can be placed in plastic cartons/ vials and leak proof containers. To avoid continuous microbial activity related to sample taken from damp area, they are refrigerated prior.

== Geophysical instruments ==
=== Ground penetrating radar ===
The principle use of a ground-penetrating radar device in regards to forensic geology is to find buried bodies. This instrument has been most useful in resolving missing person cases. As well improving the recovery of the body by giving a general area to which the body is buried this also decreases excavation time. Studies conducted using this device show data of its capability to discover hallow and forensic relevant locations as well as specific geometries. This method includes reflective signalling off of objects in the ground that undergo different electronic properties via a transmittance signal. The actual device contains a radio transmitter and receiver that attaches to antennas that are attached to the ground.

=== Seismograph ===
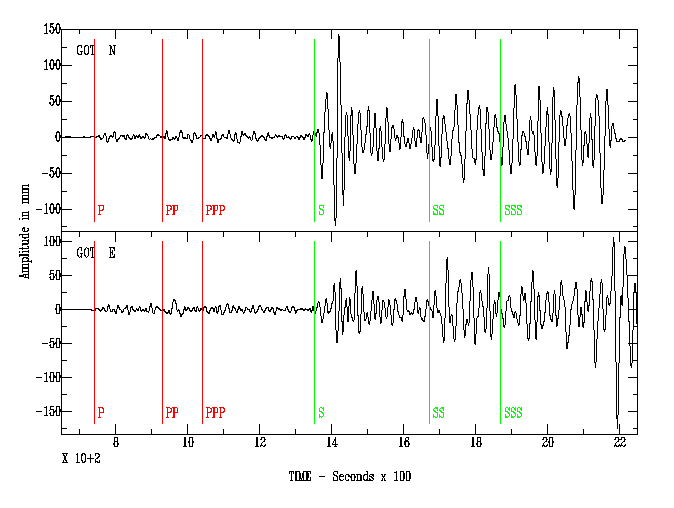
Seismograph produced from the 1906 San Francisco earthquake

The seismograph devices functions under the principle of waves that travel differently through rocks and are recorded as vibrations. For it to function properly there must be shocks produced and a manor on detecting these waves. Depending on the rocks under the earth, the waves will travel at different velocities. This is measured through the time it takes for waves to reach the area of shock along with the time it takes to reach the detector. In forensic applications, the device is used to understand explosives and differentiating them from natural occurrences such as earthquakes. Because of the varying surface wave magnitude varies significantly between both occurrences. Natural disasters emit longer and higher intensity energy then man mad events such as chemical explosions, nuclear explosion, plane or train crashes.

== See also ==
- Forensic geophysics
- Forensic science
- Chemistry
- Soil science
- Mineralogy

== Notes ==
- Healy, Rachel . “Botanist Tells How Nettles Helped Solve Soham Murders.” The Guardian, June2024. https://www.theguardian.com/uk-news/article/2024/jun/30/botanist-tells-how-nettles-helped-solve-soham-murders.
- Donnelly, Laurance, Duncan Pirrie, Mark Harrison, Alistair Ruffell, and Lorna Dawson. A Guide to Forensic Geology. London: The Geological Society of London2021. https://pubs.geoscienceworld.org/gsl/books/edited-volume/2327/A-Guide-to-Forensic-Geology.
- This book, published by the Geological Society of London, goes into extensive detail, with each chapter written by a different author. This book covers topics from the field to the courtroom.
- Tiedge, Tessa M., Kim R. Love, and Kelly A. Meiklejohn. “Utilizing eDNA from Bacteria, Fungi, Plants, and Arthropods Associated with Mock Geologic Evidence for Sample-to-Sample Comparisons and Study Site Separation: A Feasibility Study.” Forensic Science International: Genetics, 4. https://nij.ojp.gov/library/publications/utilizing-edna-bacteria-fungi-plants-and-arthropods-associated-mock-geologic.
- This is an article from a scholarly journal from the International Institute of Justice. This article provides an in-depth case study on the feasibility of using our environment to explain crimes.
- Milstein, Randall L. “Forensic Geoscience.” EBSCO. 2020. https://www.ebsco.com/research-starters/geology/forensic-geoscience/.
