= National Geomagnetism Program =

Program directed by the United States Geological Survey

The U.S. National Geomagnetism Program is a program directed by the USGS that monitors the Earth's magnetic field.

== History ==
- 1840–1845 Magnetic observatories at Harvard and Girard College
- 1860 Coast Survey begins regular magnetic observations at Maine's Fort Sullivan, Tift's Observatory in Florida and others
- 1882–1883 First International Polar Year
- 1901–1956 United States Coast and Geodetic Survey operates Cheltenham Magnetic Observatory in Maryland
- 1905–1918 USC&GS Explorer performs magnetic surveys
- 1909 Carnegie wooden survey ship built for Carnegie Institution for Science begins seven cruises to measure the Earth's magnetic field
- 1932–1933 Second International Polar Year
- 1956 Fredericksburg Magnetic Observatory in Virginia replaces Cheltenham
- 1957–1958 International Geophysical Year
- 1961 Boulder Geomagnetic Observatory, Colorado
- 1973 NOAA/USC&GS geomagnetism program transferred to the USGS
- 1979–1980 Magsat satellite survey from orbit
- 1994 U.S. National Space Weather Program (NSWP), an interagency collaboration

== See also ==
History of geomagnetism
