= Energy meteorology =

Energy meteorology is a branch of meteorology. It deals with the meteorological and climatological services for applications in the renewable energy sector or other weather-dependent elements in the energy system.

== Background ==
The renewable energy sources wind and solar (especially photovoltaics) have made an increasing contribution to electricity generation in recent years. Both energy sources are weather-dependent and therefore reliable meteorological information is of increasing importance for the planning and operation of the energy system. Similarly, energy consumption (e.g. for heating and cooling) or the production of biomass are dependent on the prevailing weather conditions. Energy meteorology is dedicated to such requirements and is thus an application-oriented subfield of meteorology.

== Methods ==
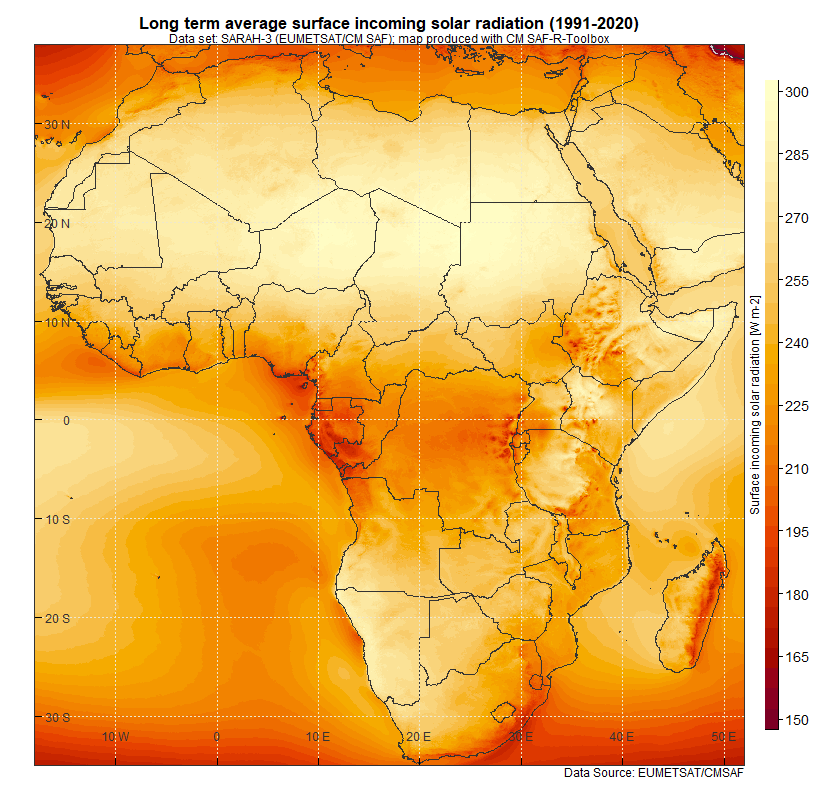
Long term average of incoming surface solar radiation in Africa for the period 1991 to 2020, derived from satellite data. Dataset: SARAH-3 of EUMETSAT CM SAF

In the renewable energy context, the energy sector requires meteorological information on various time scales, for example, long-term observation data for evaluating locations or weather forecasts for estimating the energy feed-in for the coming days.

Energy meteorological tasks are therefore addressed using observational data as well as numerical weather predictions. For the evaluation of long-term weather conditions, various models, such as reanalyses, are used in addition to direct observations.

To estimate the impacts of climate change on the energy sector, climate projections based on climate models can be used.

== Further reading on energy meteorology ==
- Lars E. Olsson (1994), "ENERGY-METEOROLOGY: A new discipline", Renewable Energy, vol. 5–8, no. 5, pp. 1243–1246, Bibcode:1994REne....5.1243O, doi:10.1016/0960-1481(94)90157-0
- World Meteorological Organization (2011), "Meteorology and the energy sector – a WMO perspective", WMO Bulletin, vol. 60, no. 2, pp. 73–79
