= Stüve diagram =

Thermodynamic diagram

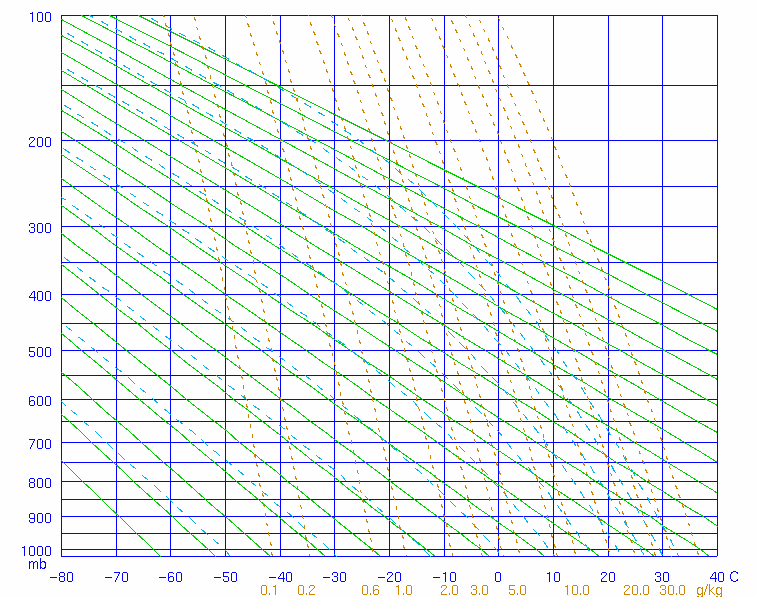
Example of a Stüve diagram.

A Stüve diagram is one type of thermodynamic diagram commonly used in weather analysis and forecasting.

This diagram has a simplicity in that it uses straight lines for the three primary variables: pressure, temperature and potential temperature. The isotherms are straight and vertical (acting as the x-axis) while isobars are straight and horizontal (acting as the y-axis). Dry adiabats are straight and solid green but are tilted while moist adiabats do not have the same slope throughout and are dashed and cyan. Wind barbs, symbols used to show wind speed and direction, are often plotted at the side of the diagram to indicate the winds at different heights.

However, using this configuration sacrifices the equal-area property of the original Clausius–Clapeyron relation requirements between the temperature of the environment and the temperature of a parcel of air lifted/lowered. Although it permits analysis of the cloud cover and the stability of the airmass, it thus does not permit calculation of the Convective Available Potential Energy (CAPE). This is why the three other thermodynamic diagrams (emagrams, tephigrams, and skew-T log-P diagrams) are most often preferred, the latter in the USA nowadays.

== See also ==
- Thermodynamic diagrams
- Skew-T log-P diagram
- Emagram
- Tephigram
