= Emagram =

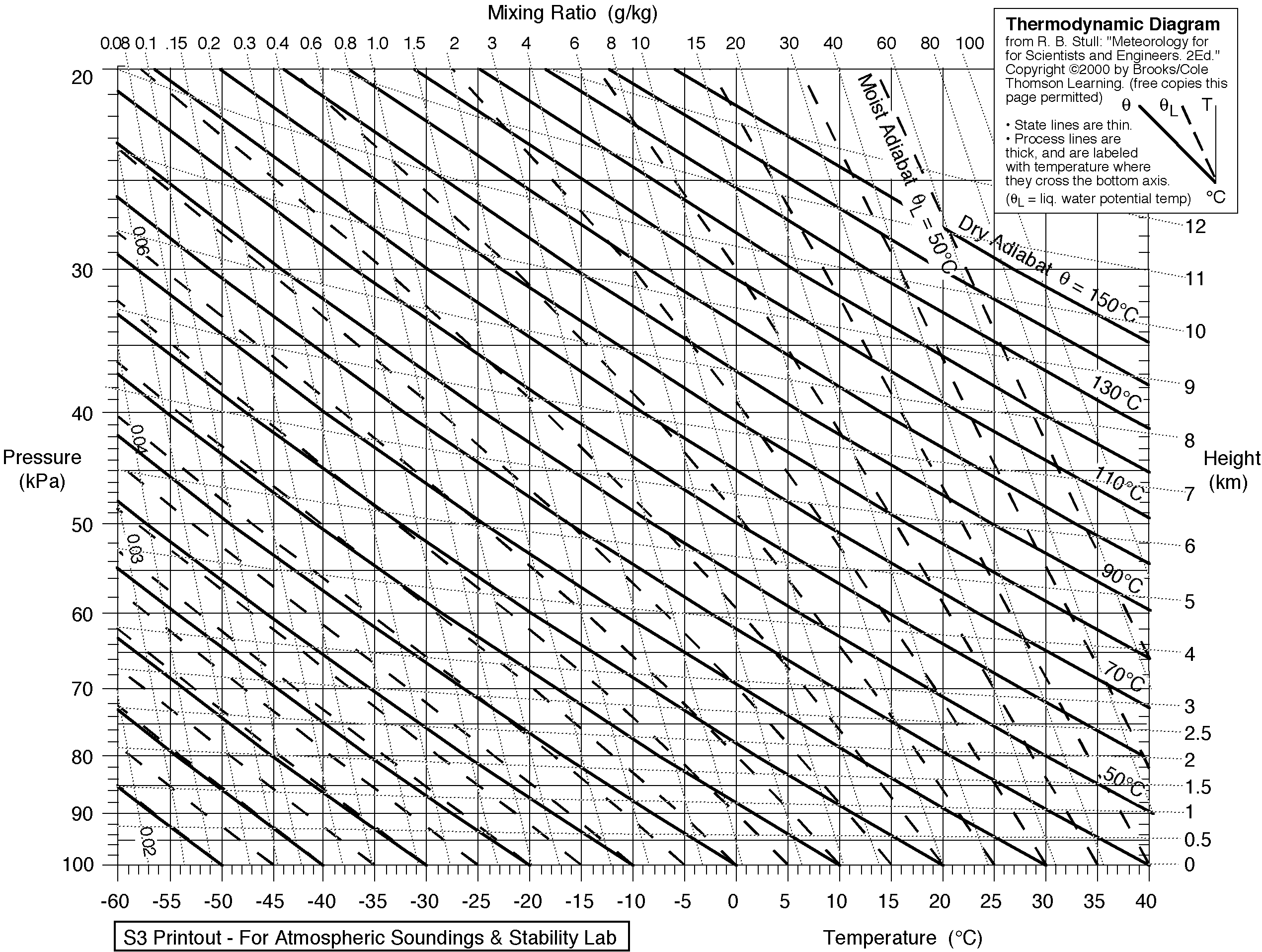
Sample emagram

An emagram is one of four thermodynamic diagrams used to display temperature lapse rate and moisture content profiles in the atmosphere. The emagram has axes of temperature (T) and pressure (p). In the emagram, the dry adiabats make an angle of about 45 degrees with the isobars, isotherms are vertical and isopleths of saturation mixing ratio are almost straight and vertical.

Usually, temperature and dew point data from radiosondes are plotted on these diagrams to allow calculations of convective stability or Convective Available Potential Energy (CAPE). Wind barbs are often plotted at the side of a tephigram to indicate the winds at different heights.

First devised in 1884 by Heinrich Hertz, the emagram is used primarily in European countries. Other countries use similar thermodynamic diagrams for the same purpose. However, the details of their construction vary. Emagram is the first atmospheric thermodynamic diagram.

== See also ==
- Thermodynamic diagrams
- Skew-T log-P diagram
- Tephigram
- Stüve diagram

== Bibliography ==
- Iribarne, J. V.; Godson, W. L. (1981). Atmospheric Thermodynamics (2nd ed.). Dordrecht, the Netherlands: D. Reidel Publishing Company. ISBN 978-90-277-1297-4.
- Rogers, R. R.; Yau, M. K. (1989). Short Course in Cloud Physics (3rd ed.). Butterworth-Heinemann. ISBN 978-0750632157.
