= Skew-T log-P diagram =

Thermodynamic diagram used in weather analysis

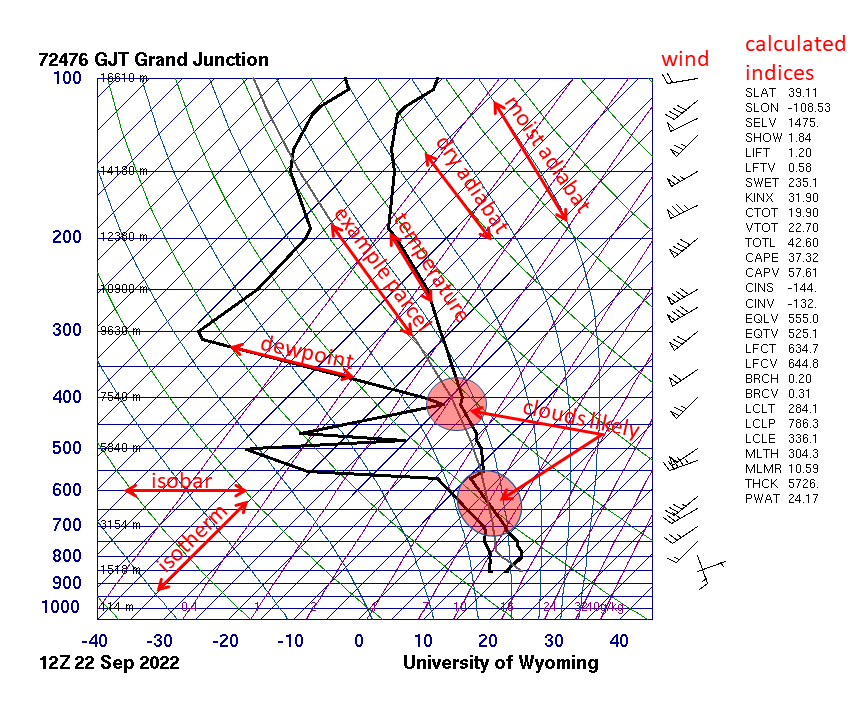
Annotated skew-T log-P diagram. The X-axis number labels are for the diagonal temperature lines in blue, and the Y-axis has pressure in millibars.

A skew-T log-P diagram is one of four thermodynamic diagrams commonly used in weather analysis and forecasting. In 1947, Nicolai Herlofson proposed a modification to the emagram that allows straight, horizontal isobars and provides for a large angle between isotherms and dry adiabats, similar to that in the tephigram. This made the diagram useful for analysis techniques that were then being adopted by the United States Air Force.

Such a diagram has pressure plotted on the vertical axis, with a logarithmic scale (thus the "log-P" part of the name), and the temperature plotted skewed, with isothermal lines at 45° to the plot (thus the "skew-T" part of the name). Plotting a hypothetical set of measurements with constant temperature for all altitudes would result in a line angled 45° to the right. In practice, since temperature usually drops with altitude, the graphs are usually mostly vertical (see examples linked to below).

The major use for skew-T log-P diagrams is the plotting of radiosonde soundings, which give a vertical profile of the temperature and dew point temperature throughout the troposphere and lower stratosphere. The isopleths on the diagram can then be used to simplify many tedious calculations involved, which were previously performed by hand or not at all. Many skew-T log-P diagrams also include a vertical representation of the wind speed and direction using wind barbs. Important atmospheric characteristics such as saturation, atmospheric instability, and wind shear are critical in severe weather forecasting, by which skew-T log-P diagrams allow quick visual analysis. The diagrams are widely used by glider pilots to forecast the strength of thermals and the height of the base of the associated cumulus clouds.

== Bibliography ==
- Iribarne, J. V.; Godson, W. L. (1981). Atmospheric Thermodynamics (2nd ed.). Dordrecht, the Netherlands: D. Reidel Publishing Company. ISBN 978-90-277-1297-4.
- Petty, G. W. (2008). A First Course in Atmospheric Thermodynamics. Sundog Publishing. ISBN 978-0-9729033-2-5.
- Rogers, R. R.; Yau, M. K. (1989). Short Course in Cloud Physics (3rd ed.). Butterworth-Heinemann. ISBN 978-0750632157.

== See also ==
- Thermodynamic diagrams
- Tephigram
- Emagram
- Stüve diagram
- Meteogram
