= Forensic geophysics =

Use of geophysics tools in forensic science

Forensic geophysics is a branch of forensic science and is the study, the search, the localization and the mapping of buried objects or elements beneath the soil or the water, using geophysics tools for legal purposes. There are various geophysical techniques for forensic investigations in which the targets are buried and have different dimensions (from weapons or metallic barrels to human burials and bunkers). Geophysical methods have the potential to aid the search and the recovery of these targets because they can non-destructively and rapidly investigate large areas where a suspect, illegal burial or, in general, a forensic target is hidden in the subsoil. When in the subsurface there is a contrast of physical properties between a target and the material in which it is buried, it is possible to individuate and define precisely the concealing place of the searched target. It is also possible to recognize evidences of human soil occupation or excavation, both recent and older. Forensic geophysics is an evolving technique that is gaining popularity and prestige in law enforcement.

Searched for objects obviously include clandestine graves of murder victims, but also include unmarked burials in graveyards and cemeteries, weapons used in criminal activities and environmental crime illegally dumping material.

There are various near-surface geophysical techniques that can be utilised to detect a near-surface buried object, which should be site and case-specific. A thorough desk study (including historical maps), utility survey, site reconnaissance and control studies should be undertaken before trial geophysical surveys and then full geophysical surveys are undertaken in phased investigations. Note also other search techniques should be used to first to prioritise suspect areas, for example cadaver dogs or forensic geomorphologists.

== Techniques ==
For large-scale buried objects, seismic surveys may be appropriate but these have, at best, 2m vertical resolution so may not be ideal for certain targets, more typically they are used to detect bedrock below the surface.

For relatively quick site surveys, bulk ground electrical conductivity surveys can be collected which identifies areas of disturbance of different ground but these can suffer from a lack of resolution. This recent Black Death investigation in central London shows an example. shows a successful woodland search for a cold case in woodland in New Zealand.

Ground-penetrating radar (or GPR) has a typical maximum depth below ground level (bgl) of 10 m, depending upon the antennae frequencies used, typically 50 MHz to 1.2 Gz. The higher the frequency the smaller the object that can be resolved but also penetration depths decrease, so operators need to think carefully when choosing antennae frequencies and, ideally, undertake trial surveys using different antennae over a target at a known depth onsite. GPR is the most popularly used technique in forensic search, but is not suitable in certain soil types and environments, e.g. coastal (i.e. salt-rich) and clay-rich soils (lack of penetration). 2D profiles can be relatively quickly collected and, if time permits, successive profiles can be used to generate 3D datasets which may resolve more subtle targets. Recent studies have used GPR to locate mass graves from the Spanish Civil War in mountainous and urban environments.

Electrical resistivity methods can also detect objects, especially in clay-rich soil which would preclude the use of GPR. There are different equipment configurations, the dipole-dipole (fixed-offset) method is the most common which can traverse across an area, measuring resistivity variations at a set depth (typically 1-2x probe separations) which have been used in forensic searches. More slower methods are putting out many probes and collecting both spatially horizontally and vertically, called Electrical resistivity imaging (ERI). Multiple 2D profiles is termed electrical resistivity tomography (ERT).

Magnetometry can detect buried metal (or indeed fired objects such as bricks or even where surface fires were) using simple total field magnetometers, through to fluxgate gradiometers and high-end alkali vapour gradiometers, depending upon accuracy (and cost) required. Surface magnetic susceptibility has also shown recent promise for forensic search.

Water-based searches are also becoming more common, with specialist marine magnetometers, side-scan sonar and other acoustic methods and even water-penetrating radar methods used to rapidly scan bottoms of ponds, lakes, rivers and near-shore depositional environments.

== Controlled research ==
There has been recent efforts to undertake research over known buried and below-water surface simulated forensic targets in order to gain an insight into optimum search technique(s) and/or equipment configuration(s). Most commonly, this involved the burial porcine cadavers and long-term monitoring for soilwater, seasonal effects on electrical resistivity surveys, burial in walls and beneath concrete, and Long-Term monitoring in the UK, the US and Latin America. Finally there has been surveys in graveyards over graves of known ages to determine the geophysical responses of multi-geophysical techniques with increasing burial ages

== See also ==
- Forensic geology
