= Tephigram =

Thermodynamic diagram used in weather analysis

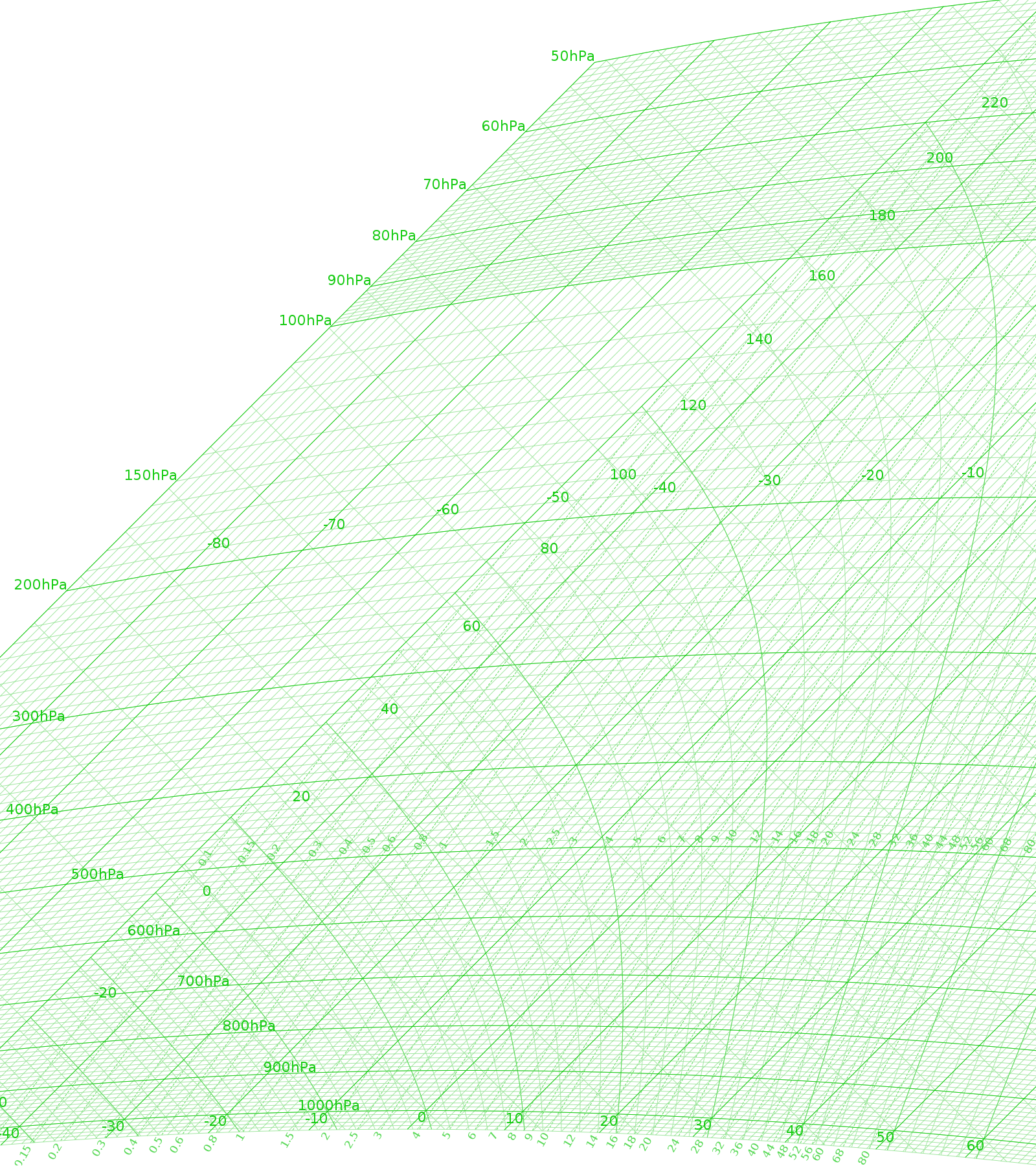
Tephigram

Annotated tephigram

A tephigram is one of several (Note: Other thermodynamic diagrams commonly used in weather analysis include: Skew-T log-P diagram, a variation of the Emagram; Emagram) thermodynamic diagrams commonly used in weather analysis and forecasting. The name evolved from the original name "T-$\phi$-gram" to describe the axes of temperature (T) and entropy ($\phi$) used to create the plot. Usually, temperature and dew point data from radiosondes are plotted on these diagrams to allow calculations of convective stability or convective available potential energy (CAPE). Wind barbs are often plotted alongside a tephigram to indicate the winds at different heights.

== Description ==
The tephigram was invented by Napier Shaw in 1915 and is primarily used in the United Kingdom and Canada. Other countries use similar thermodynamic diagrams for the same purpose; however, the details of their construction vary. In a tephigram, isotherms are straight and have a 45-degree inclination to the right, while isobars are horizontal and slightly curved. Dry adiabats are also straight and have a 45-degree inclination to the left, while moist adiabats are curved.

The main reason the British Met Office, the Meteorological Service of Canada, and Met Éireann (Irish Meteorological Service) use tephigram is that the areas contained by the curves have equal energies for equal areas. This property enables better comparisons of CAPE and, hence, better assessments of convective systems.

== See also ==
- Thermodynamic diagrams
- Stüve diagram

== Bibliography ==
- M.H.P. Ambaum, Thermal Physics of the Atmosphere, published by Wiley-Blackwell, April 16, 2010, 240 pages. ISBN 978-0-470-74515-1
- R.R. Rogers and M.K. Yau, Short Course in Cloud Physics, Third Edition, published by Butterworth-Heinemann, January 1, 1989, 304 pages. ISBN 9780750632157 ISBN 0-7506-3215-1
- J.V. Iribarne and W.L. Godson, Atmospheric Thermodynamics, 2nd Edition, published by D. Reidel Publishing Company, Dordrecht, Netherlands, 1981, 278 pages, ISBN 90-277-1297-2, ISBN 978-90-277-1296-7
