= Climate envoy =

Government representative for international climate policy

Climate envoys are individuals that oversee and direct climate change diplomacy efforts. They are often appointed to their positions by regional organizations, national governments, blocs, or international entities. For instance, the Caribbean Community (CARICOM) appointed James Fletcher to the role of climate envoy in 2025. During the Biden Administration, the United States (US) established a US Special Presidential Envoy for Climate position, to which former US Secretary of State John Kerry was appointed. The European Union (EU) appointed Anthony Agotha as their Special Envoy for Climate and Environment. Both the United Nations (UN) and the World Health Organization (WHO) have elected climate envoys as well.

Climate envoys promote action and awareness through the implementation of legislation, programs, and policies as well as through collaboration on the local, state, national, and international levels. By facilitating diplomatic communication, coordinating joint efforts among different parties, and representing specific interests in international negotiations, climate envoys serve as liaisons in multilevel climate governance, guiding and enacting global climate initiatives.

== History of Climate Envoys and International Climate Action ==
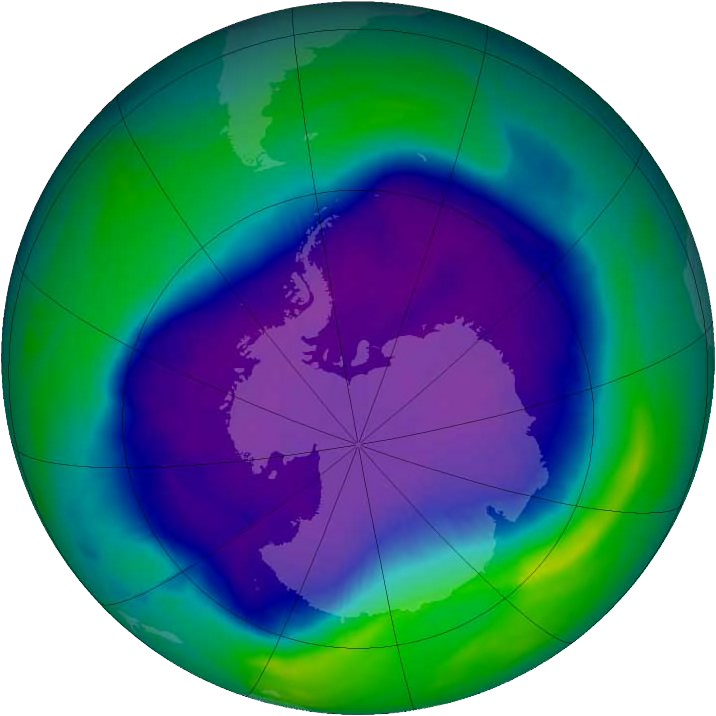
The discovery of an ozone hole above Antarctica led to the Montreal Protocol of 1987, which enforced strict international regulations over the production and consumption of ozone-depleting substances (ODSs). This treaty resulted in significant ozone recovery and is deemed as one of the most successful global climate mitigation efforts, highlighting the importance of climate diplomacy.

The climate change movement began to gain momentum during the 1970s and 1980s, coinciding with the rise in global environmentalism during this time. The publication of prominent works, including Rachel Carson’s Silent Spring (1962), the Club of Rome’s Limits to Growth (1972), and the World Commission on Environment and Development’s Our Common Future (1987), helped raise public awareness of humanity’s global and destructive environmental impact. Furthermore, the discovery of the Antarctic ozone hole in 1985 by British scientists sparked widespread concern and highlighted the critical need for international policies that address the growing threat of climate change. From this revelation emerged the 1985 Vienna Convention for the Protection of the Ozone Layer — a framework for coordinated international efforts to prevent ozone depletion — followed by the landmark Montreal Protocol of 1987, which limited the global production and consumption of nearly 100 ozone-depleting substances (ODSs) and has therefore played a crucial role in ozone restoration. ODS levels have since declined by 97%, with a full recovery of the stratospheric layer expected by mid-century.

Because ODSs are potent greenhouse gases (GHGs), these imposed restrictions have also led to a significant reduction in global GHG emissions, in turn combating a major driving force behind climate change. The Montreal Protocol is still widely considered as one of the most monumental international climate change mitigation achievements in history. Its profound impact and success was an early lesson of the importance of international scientific cooperation and diplomacy as well as environmental leadership. The numerous diplomats, delegates, and ambassadors that participated in the creation and implementation of the treaty — of which included U.S. Department of State negotiator Richard Elliot Benedick — laid the foundation for the future official role of climate envoys.

The Conference of the Parties (COP) are annual meetings in which the 198 parties that have ratified the United Nations Framework Convention on Climate Change (UNFCCC) convene to negotiate global climate objectives and coordinate actions that address climate change.

With the Montreal Protocol serving as a quintessential example of successful climate action, a greater emphasis has been placed on global collaboration in the climate change movement. Over the past 35 years, various international conferences and negotiations have been held to orchestrate effective climate change mitigation and adaptation protocols. These forums set the stage for pivotal milestones and led to the establishment of key programs and organizations. The 1979 First World Climate Conference (WCC-1) in Geneva, organized by the World Meteorological Organization (WMO) and attended by scientists from 53 countries and 24 international organizations, was one of the first major international climate change-focused summits. It resulted in the establishment of the World Climate Programme (WCP), which encompasses the World Climate Research Programme (WCRP) that oversees predictive and analytical research on global climate patterns, trends, and variability.

The Intergovernmental Panel on Climate Change (IPCC), jointly founded in 1988 by WMO and the United Nations Environment Programme (UNEP), consists of members from 195 countries that meet annually or biannually to compile and provide governments with updated scientific data that guides climate action and policymaking. That same year, over 300 scientists and policymakers participated in the Toronto Conference to address the role of atmospheric pollution in perpetuating climate change. In 1990, the Second World Climate Conference (WCC-2) prompted the establishment of the Global Climate Observing System (GCOS), which routinely monitors and assesses the state of global climate. Additionally, it paved the way for the United Nations Framework Convention on Climate Change (UNFCCC) — a foundational global agreement that laid the groundwork for coordinated international responses to and negotiations surrounding the climate crisis, with its primary aim being the reduction of GHG emissions and prevention of anthropogenic disturbances within natural climatic processes. The UNFCCC was introduced and opened for signature at the 1992 Rio Earth Summit, formally known as the United Nations Conference on Environment and Development (UNCED). 155 countries signed the UNFCCC at the time, though as of 2022, it has been ratified by all 198 countries. Other significant outcomes of the UNCED included the Rio Declaration on Environment and Development, Agenda 21, and the Statement of Forest Principles — all three of which were signed and adopted by the 178 countries in attendance. The Intergovernmental Meeting on the World Climate Programme took place about a year later, in which 360 delegates from 134 nations and 83 specialists from 37 international organizations convened to discuss the objectives of The Climate Agenda and establishment of national climate programs, subsequently leading to the appointment of the Interagency Committee for the Climate Agenda (IACCA), which served as a liaison for various international climate entities during the rest of the 1990s.

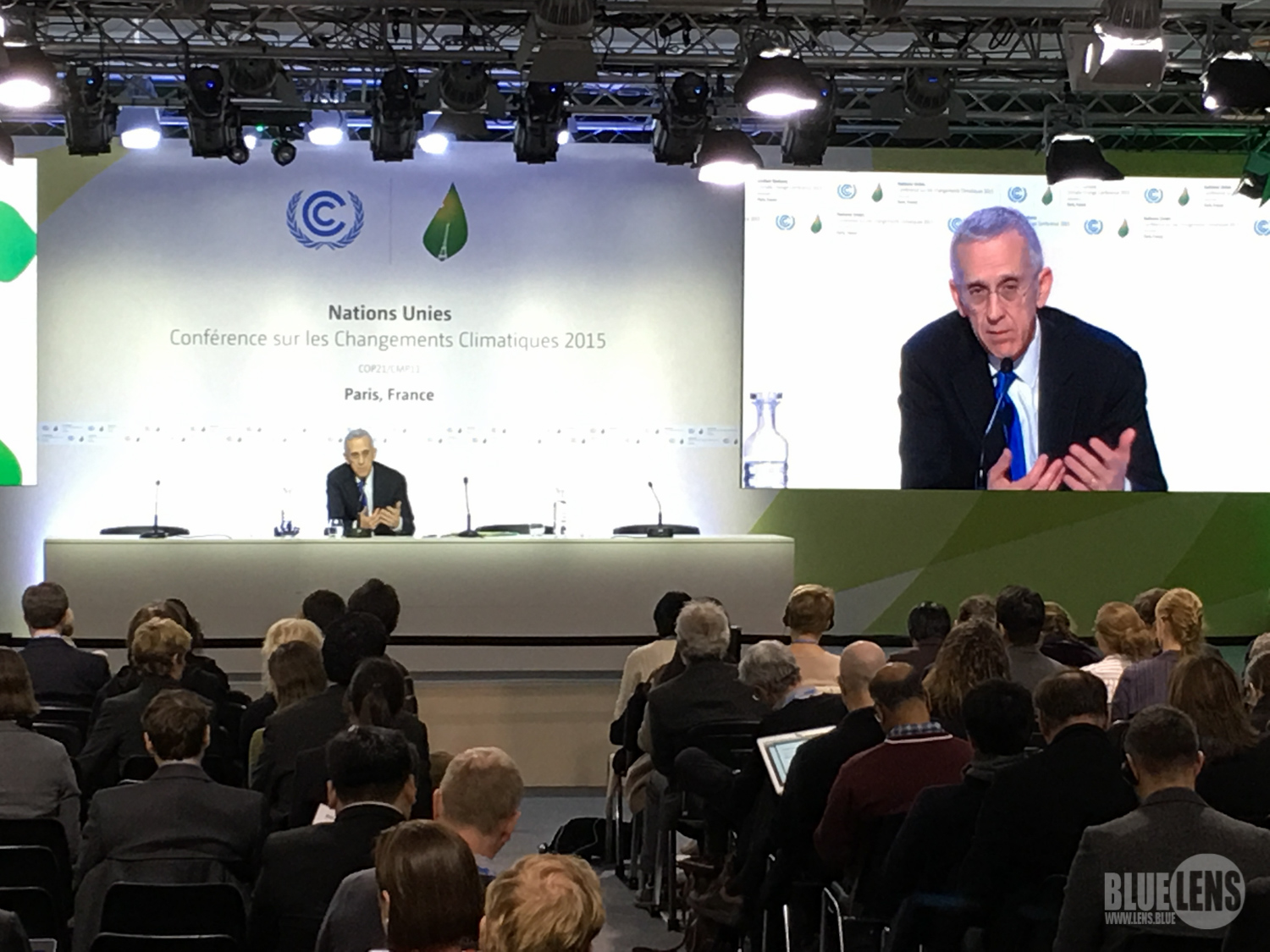
The Paris Agreement was established as a result of the COP21 that was held in Paris, France in 2015.

Following the UNFCCC’s official entry into force in 1994, the first Conference of the Parties (COP1) was held in Berlin in 1995. These annual forums eventually gave rise to central components or extensions of the UNFCCC, including the Kyoto Protocol of 1997 (via COP3), which mandated all 37 industrialized nations and the European Union to cut down their GHG emissions, and Paris Agreement of 2015 (via COP21), which was a consensus among the 195 parties of the UN to take action against climate change.

In addition to the emergence of notable climate reforms as a result of international alliances, the global mobilization of forces against climate change was led by several influential climate change activists and political figures. Former United Kingdom (UK) Prime Minister Margaret Thatcher, former US Vice President Al Gore, former US Under Secretary of State for Global Affairs Frank E. Loy, former US President George H.W. Bush, former Iraqi Ambassador to the US Fareed Mustafa Kamil Yasseen, and former Head of China's State Environmental Protection Administration (SEPA) Xie Zhenhua were among those known for their work and leadership on the frontlines of the global climate change movement during the late twentieth century.

With GHG emissions and temperatures reaching unprecedented extremes, the need for an official position revolving around climate diplomacy became evident. The official title of climate envoy was first coined in 2007 by the UN. On May 1, 2007, Ban Ki-moon, who was the Secretary-General at the time, appointed three individuals to serve as UN Special Envoys on Climate Change: former Norwegian Prime Minister and World Commission on Environment and Development chair Gro Harlem Brundtland, former UN General Assembly president and Minister of Foreign Affairs and Trade of the Republic of Korea Han Seung Soo, and former Chilean president Ricardo Lagos.

Since then, the title and role of climate envoy has become well-established. Examples of past and current climate envoys include:

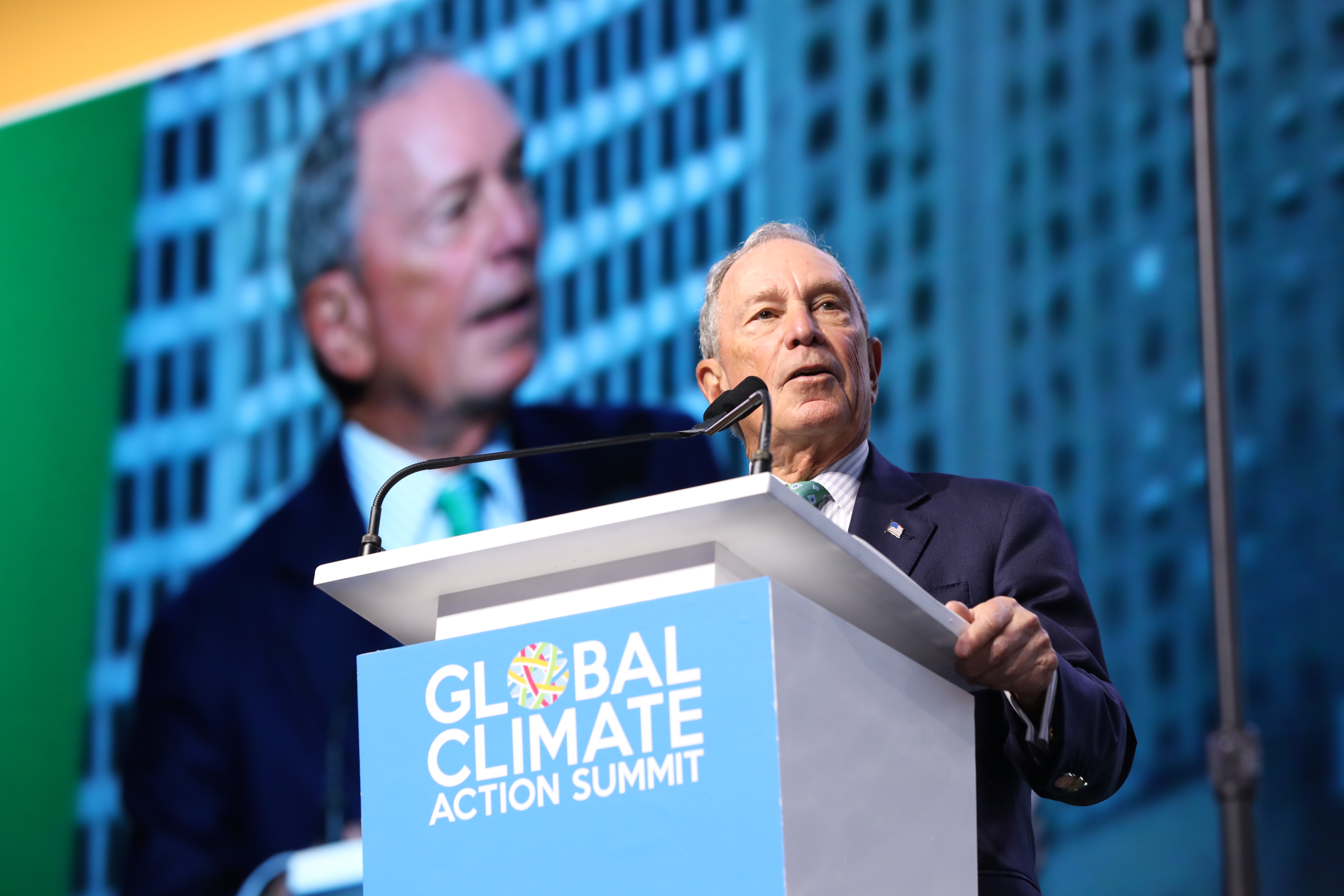
Michael Bloomberg currently serves as the UN Special Envoy for Climate Ambition and Solutions.

- Adao Soares Barbosa, who is Timor-Leste's current Special Envoy and Ambassador at large for Climate Affairs.
- Ali Daud Mohamed, who is the current Climate Change Envoy of the Republic of Kenya.
- Anthony Agotha, who is the current Ambassador at large and the Special Envoy for Climate and Environment at the European External Action Service (EEAS).
- Avinash Persaud, who is the current Special Envoy on Climate Finance to Barbadian Prime Minister Mia Mottley.
- Bader Omar Al-Dafa, who is Qatar's current Special Envoy for Climate Change and Sustainability.
- Benedikt Höskuldsson, who formerly served as Iceland's Special Envoy for Climate from 2022 to 2024.
- Caroline Dumas, who is the current International Organization for Migration (IOM) Director General's Special Envoy for Migration and Climate Change.
- Fareed Mustafa Kamil Yasseen, who formerly served as the Climate Envoy of the Republic of Iraq.
- James Fletcher, who is the current Caribbean Community (CARICOM) Climate Envoy.
- Jennifer Lee Morgan, who has served as the Special Envoy for International Climate Action at the German Federal Foreign Office since 2022.
- John Kerry, who was appointed by the Biden Administration as the first-ever official US Special Presidential Envoy for Climate from 2021 to 2024.
- Kamal Amakrane, who is the current Climate Envoy of the President of the UN General Assembly.
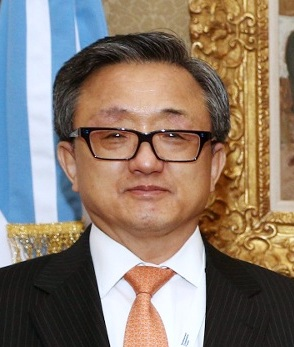
- Liu Zhenmin was appointed to the role of China's Special Envoy for Climate Change in 2024, following the retirement of his predecessor Xie Zhenhua.
  Kathy Jetn̄il-Kijiner, who is a prominent Marshallese climate change activist and currently serves as the nation's Climate Envoy.
- Liu Zhenmin, who is China's current Special Envoy for Climate Change, a position he was appointed to following Xie Zhenhua's retirement in 2024.
- Mark Carney, who was appointed to the role of UN Special Envoy on Climate Change in 2019 and subsequently the UN Secretary-General's Special Envoy on Climate Action and Finance in 2020.
- Michael Bloomberg, who was appointed to the position of UN Special Envoy for Cities and Climate Change in 2014 by former Secretary-General Ban Ki-moon and then to the position of UN Special Envoy for Climate Action in 2018 by Secretary-General António Guterres. Since 2021, he has served as the UN Special Envoy for Climate Ambition and Solutions.
- Rachel Kyte, who has served as the UK Climate Envoy or Special Representative on Climate since 2024 and was previously the World Bank Group's Special Envoy for Climate Change until 2015.
- Rachmat Witoelar, who has served as the Indonesian President’s Special Envoy for Climate Change since 2010.
- Ravi Menon, who became Singapore's first-ever Ambassador for Climate Action and Senior Adviser to the National Climate Change Secretariat at the Prime Minister's Office in 2024.
- Ruel Yamuna, who is Papua New Guinea's current Special Envoy for Climate and Environment.
- Sabra Ibrahim Noordeen, who was appointed by former Maldivian President Ibrahim Mohamed Solih to become the nation's first-ever Special Envoy for Climate Change.
- Sadiq Khan, who has served as the Mayor of London since 2016 and was appointed to the role of Special Envoy of the Fossil Free Cities for the Fossil Fuel Non-Proliferation Treaty Initiative on June 23, 2025.
- Spencer Linus Thomas, who is the Ambassador and Special Envoy for Multilateral Environmental Agreements in Grenada, serving as the nation's chief negotiator for climate change and biodiversity.
- Sultan Al Jaber, who is the United Arab Emirates (UAE)'s current Special Envoy for Climate Change.
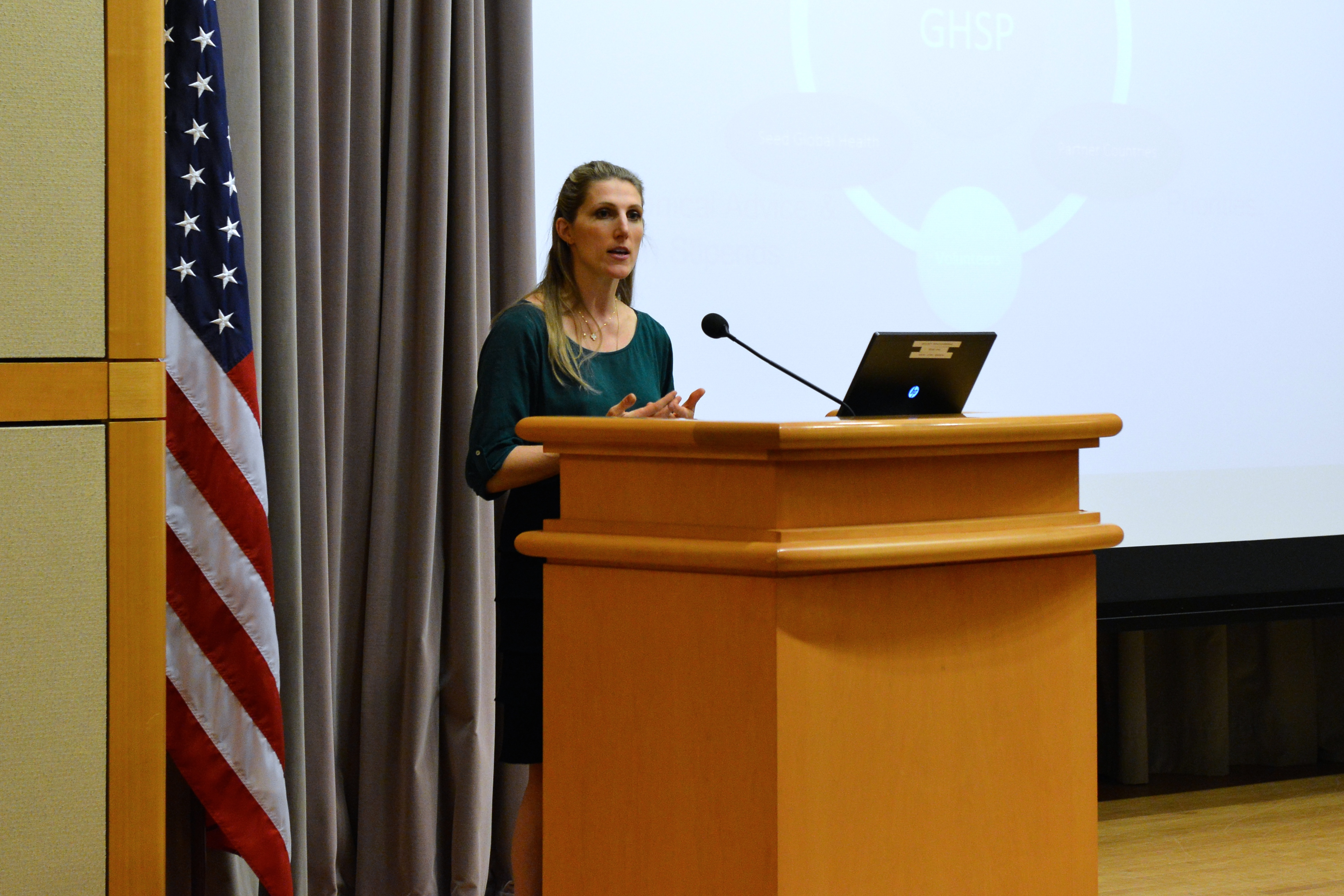
- Vanessa Kerry, MD, MSc, became the World Health Organization (WHO)’s first-ever Director-General Special Envoy for Climate Change and Health in 2023.
  Susan Biniaz, who was the US State Department's Principal Deputy Special Envoy for Climate under John Kerry from 2021 to 2024.
- Todd Stern, who served as the US Special Envoy for Climate Change from 2009 to 2016 and was the country’s chief negotiator at the 2015 Paris Climate Agreement.
- Vanessa Kerry, who was appointed as the WHO’s first-ever Director-General Special Envoy for Climate Change and Health in 2023.
- Walter Kälin, who has served as the Envoy of the Chair of the Platform on Disaster Displacement, a state-led initiative dedicated to protecting those displaced from disasters and climate change, since 2017.
- Xie Zhenhua, who was China’s Special Envoy on Climate Change from 2021 to 2024.

== US Special Presidential Envoy for Climate Change ==
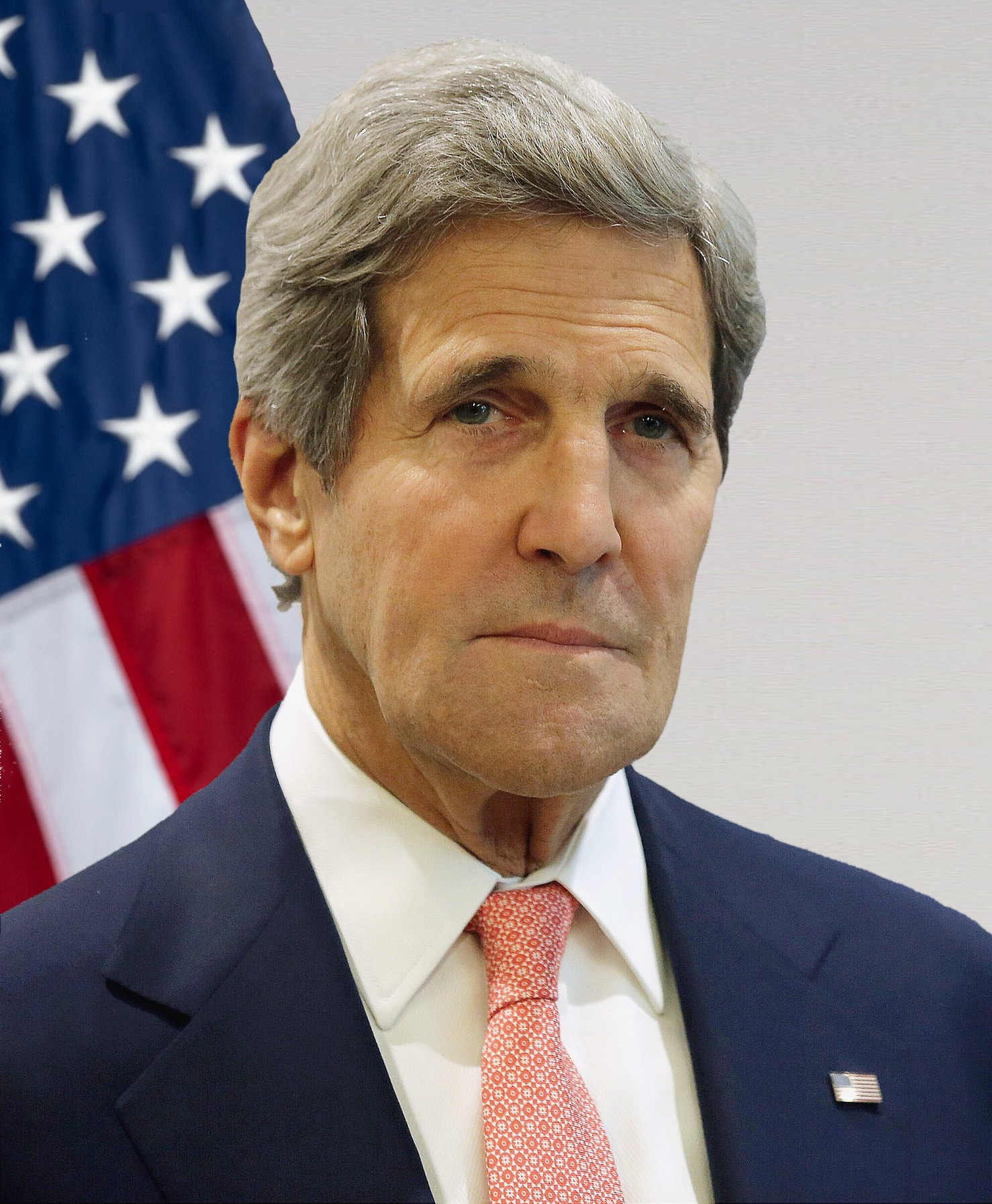
John Kerry, former US Secretary of State, was appointed by the Biden Administration in 2021 to become the first-ever US Special Presidential Envoy for Climate Change.

In November 2020, Joe Biden, who was the President-elect at the time, announced his appointment of former US Secretary of State John Kerry to the newly established Cabinet-level position of Special Presidential Envoy for Climate Change. Kerry, who had previously served under the 2013-2017 Obama Administration, was notable for his persistent, outspoken activism against climate change as well as his pivotal role in revolutionary climate action milestones. His prioritization of climate change was evident throughout his tenure as the Senate Foreign Relations Committee Chairman from 2009 to 2013, having even selected climate change to be the focal topic of his very first hearing. As Secretary of State, Kerry was the chief US negotiator for both the 2015 Paris Agreement and the 2016 Kigali Amendment to the Montreal Protocol, which concentrated on reducing the production and consumption of potent GHGs called hydrofluorocarbons (HFCs). In addition, during his chairmanship of the Arctic Council from 2015 to 2017, Kerry proposed and implemented initiatives that revolved around addressing the climate crisis, one example being the 2015 Iqaluit Declaration that recognized the importance of GHG emission reductions to mitigating climate change and improving climatic and health conditions in the Arctic.

Ultimately, Kerry’s extensive background and experience in climate change leadership were key factors that contributed to his appointment as the US’s first Special Presidential Envoy for Climate Change. Through this position, Kerry not only held Cabinet-level status but was also reserved a seat on the National Security Council (NSC), making him the first-ever climate-oriented NSC member. Given that it was unprecedented for a climate envoy to participate in the NSC, Kerry’s inauguration on January 20, 2021 ushered in a new era of climate action in the US. By considering and placing climate change in the context of national security-related discussions and decision-making, the Biden Administration demonstrated their recognition of the climate crisis as a dire threat to national security alongside their unwavering commitment to effective mobilization against climate change.

In his role as the US Special Presidential Envoy for Climate Change, Kerry was responsible for guiding US diplomacy, mobilization, and international negotiations in regard to the climate crisis as well as ensuring that the US is actively participating and contributing to the global climate change movement. This was accomplished through measures to reduce GHG emissions, spearhead clean energy initiatives, align finance flows to climate objectives, and build the resilience and adaptability of communities to climate change impacts. With a seat in the NSC, Kerry’s influence as a climate envoy exceeded that of his predecessors, providing him with the opportunity to offer a climate-oriented perspective on presidential decisions concerning foreign affairs and national security as well as ensure that the climate crisis is taken into account in these decisions. His input helped shape the Administration’s plan of action in terms of national and global climate mitigation and adaptation strategies, reinforcing the country’s capacity to deal with the detrimental, long-term consequences of climate change. However, due to the Trump Administration’s opposing stance on climate change, Kerry also faced the unique challenge of having to navigate political tensions and division surrounding this topic.

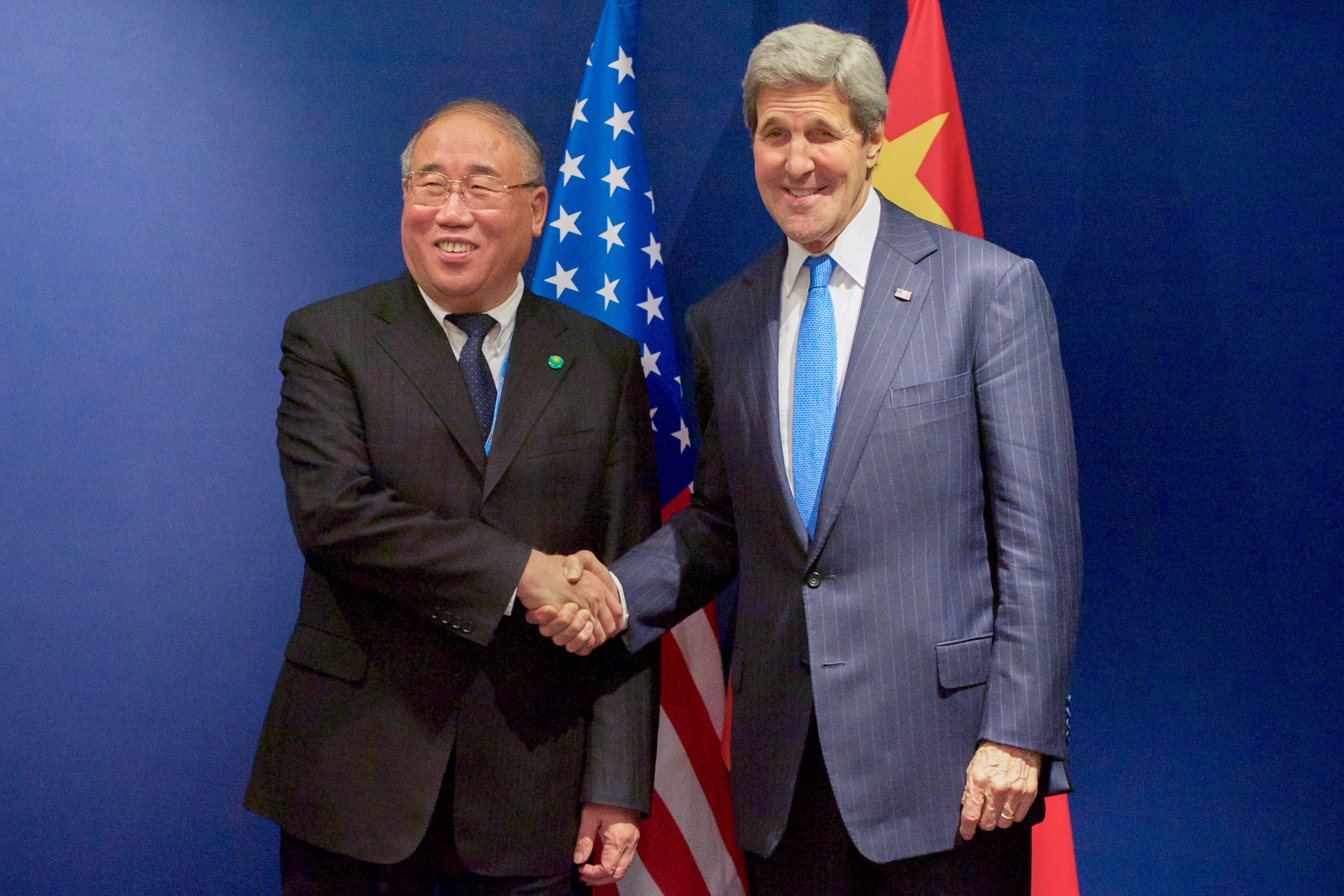
One of John Kerry's most noteworthy accomplishments during his tenure as the on Climate Change under the Biden Administration was the establishment of a US-China climate agreement to combat climate change, specifically through initiatives that reduce carbon emissions and adopt cleaner energy sources. In the photo above, Kerry and China's former Special Envoy for Climate Change Xie Zhenhua shook hands at the 2015 COP21 conference that led to the historic Paris Agreement.

During his tenure, Kerry was most known for his successful endeavors in securing a partnership with China to address and tackle this global issue. Given that China and the US rank first and second, respectively, in national carbon emissions, one of the primary objectives of Kerry’s agenda was to establish an alliance with China to achieve shared climate goals, including the transition towards cleaner energy practices and reduction of GHG emissions. Despite geopolitical tensions between the two countries complicating these efforts, US-China cooperation on the climate change front have generated fruitful outcomes, including the launching and operationalization of the Working Group on Enhancing Climate Action. This Working Group, which was co-led by Kerry and China's former Special Envoy for Climate Change Xie Zhenhua, was formed to strengthen relations between the two nations and facilitate dialogue and collaboration in regards to global climate change mitigation. It identified key domains and areas of focus to include energy transition, methane, circular economy and resource efficiency, low-carbon and sustainable provinces/states and cities, and deforestation. The group additionally agreed to stay in close communication; share respective experiences; exchange information regarding GHG emission-reducing policies, measures, and technologies; and organize collaborative projects in order to learn from one another and advance cooperation. These objectives were outlined in the Sunnylands Statement on Enhancing Cooperation to Address the Climate Crisis, which was a joint statement released by China and the US following a meeting between Kerry and Xie Zhenhua in Sunnylands, California. In this statement, the two nations, as the world's largest carbon emitters, acknowledge the threat of climate change, reaffirm their commitment to working alongside each other as well as other countries to address the crisis, and declare their continued adherence with the climate action guidelines and responsibilities imposed by the UNFCCC and the Paris Agreement.
