= NVZ =

NVZ may refer to

- Nitrate vulnerable zone, a conservation designation in the United Kingdom
- Non-volley zone in the game of Pickleball
- Northern Volcanic Zone, a zone of the Andes extending from Colombia to Ecuador
- North Volcanic Zone, one of the volcanic zones of Iceland
