= NOI Techpark =

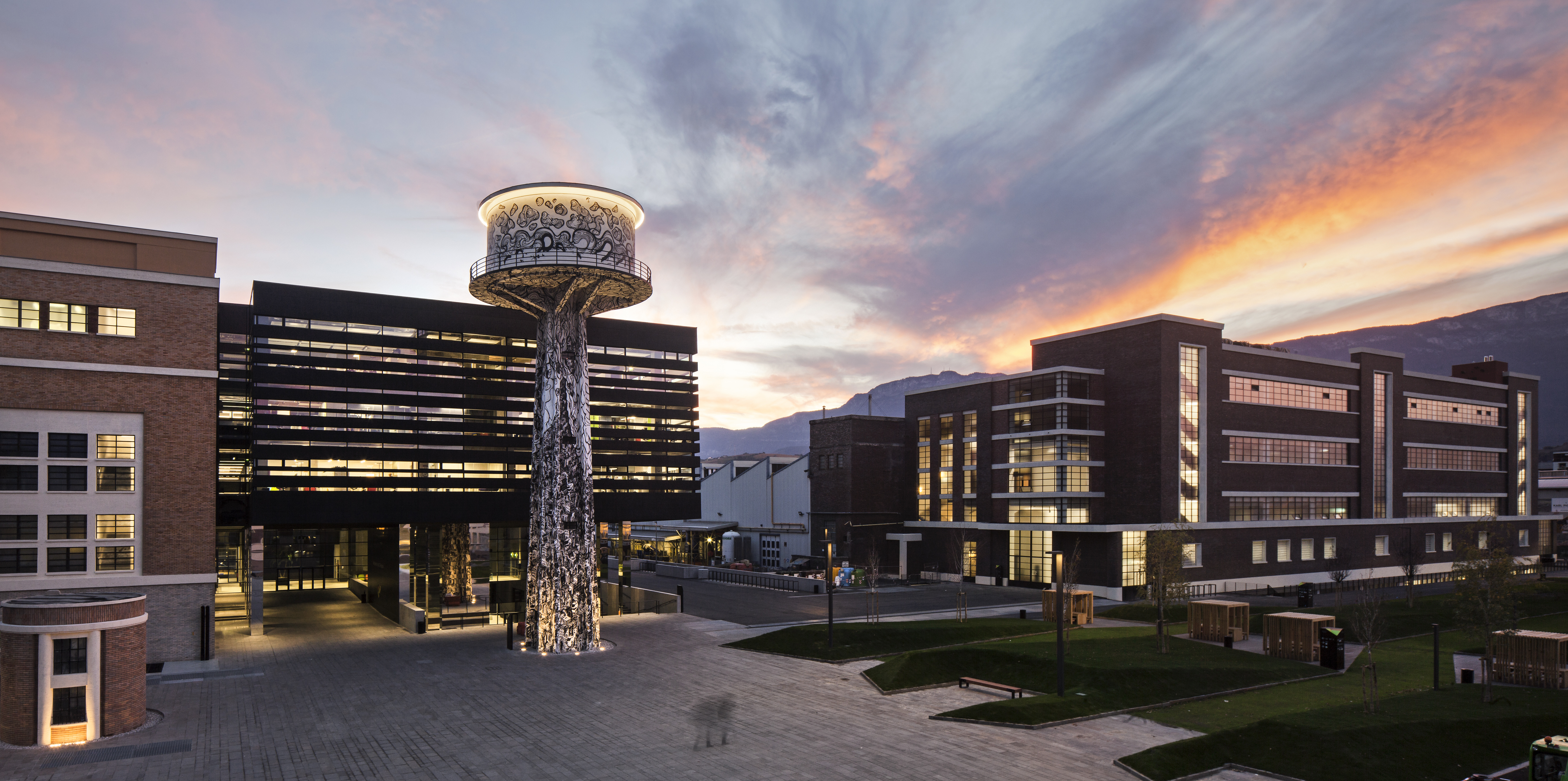
- Central Buildings of the Techpark

- Location within Europe
- Location: Bolzano, Italy
- Coordinates: 46°30′N 11°21′E
- Opening date: 2017
- Owner: Province of Bolzano
- Architect: Chapman Taylor, Claudio Lucchin
- No. of workers: 800
- Size: 12 ha (30 acres)
- Website: https://www.noi.bz.it/en

NOI Techpark is the science and technology park of South Tyrol that hosts 4 research institutes (Fraunhofer Italia, Eurac Research, ClimateHouse and Research Centre Laimburg), 4 Faculties of the Free University of Bozen-Bolzano, 40 scientific laboratories, 40 companies and 30 start-ups. Inaugurated in Bolzano in October 2017, it is the result of an urban redevelopment project. The structure is managed by NOI Spa, In-House company of the Autonomous Province of Bolzano.

== Architectural project ==
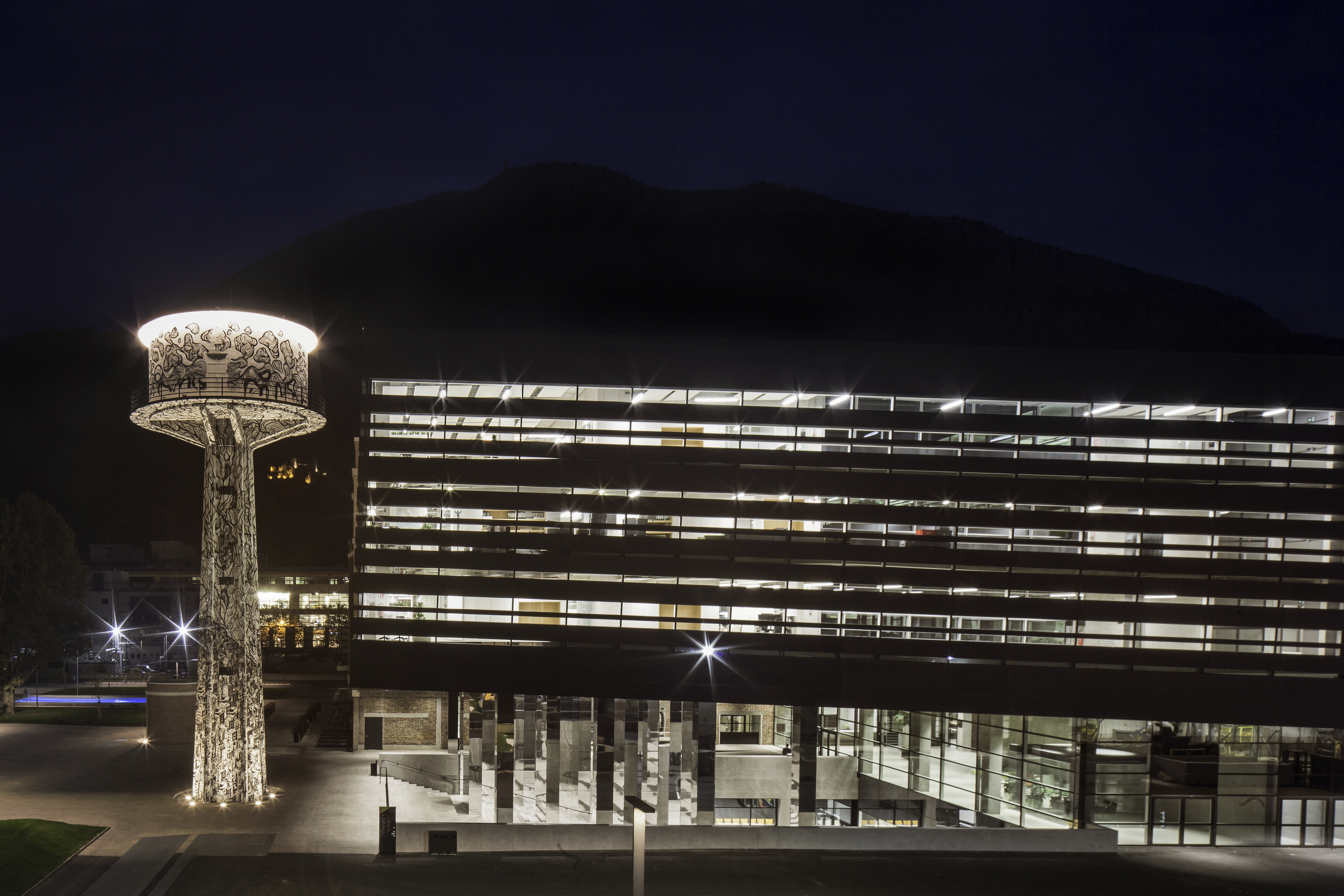
The piezometric tower and the Black Monolith seen from the side

The beginnings of NOI Techpark dates back to 2007, thanks to the international competition of ideas that opens the way to the recovery of the area and the two former aluminium production plants, clearly rationalist and placed under historical-monumental protection. The first tangible sign dates back to the following year, when, on the occasion of the seventh edition of the European Art Biennale "Manifesta", the Polish Mariusz Waras (alias M-City) decorated the iconic piezometric tower on the entrance square. The project elaborated by Chapman Taylor Italia (Milan) and Studio CLEAA (Claudio Lucchin e Architetti Associati, Bolzano) with Andrea Cattacin (Trento) has added the Black Monolith to the original complex, right in front of the piezometric tower: an inclined parallelepiped covered in black oxidized aluminum foam panels, which emerges obliquely from the ground, inspired by the enigmatic totem of Stanley Kubrick's 2001 Space Odyssey.

== History of the area ==
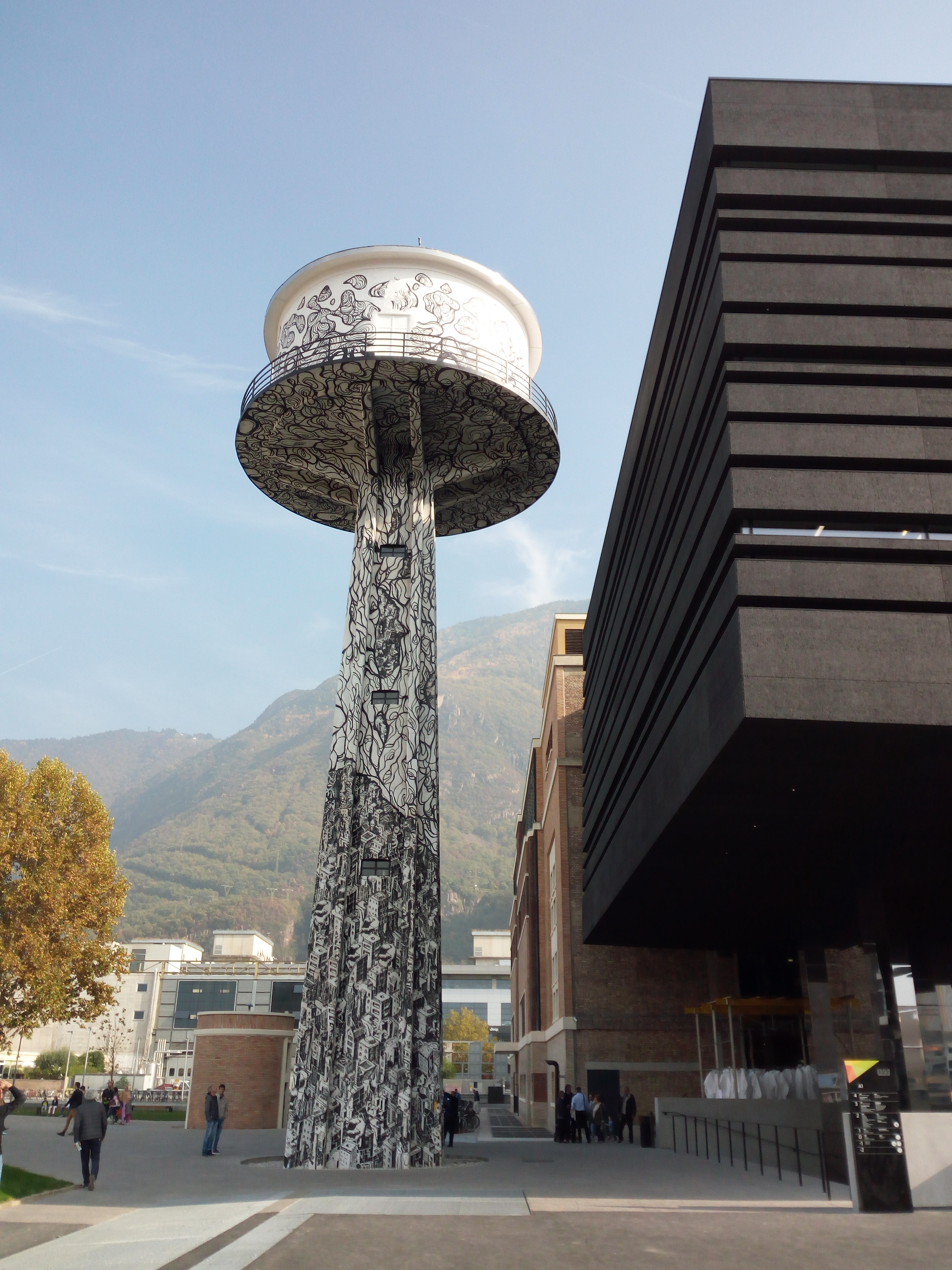
The piezometric tower

For the Italianisation of South Tyrol, the fascist regime promoted the industrialization of the city of Bolzano, promising entrepreneurs' strong economic contributions and energy in large quantities. Between 1934 and 1939, Montecatini was the first company to establish itself. Then came Lancia, the Falck steelworks and the magnesium factory which would form the large industrial area of Bolzano. The "aluminum factory" had proved to be of strategic importance as it had served, during the period of autarchy, for the electrification of the country. After the Second World War it had become the largest aluminum factory in Italy, with more than 1,700 workers, also thanks to the low-cost energy coming from the many hydroelectric power stations in the province, able to supply it with all the current necessary to power the primary kilns, which brought the bauxite to become aluminum. With the arrival of the 1970s, however, the company's production decline began, which led to the definitive closure of the two primary lines in the early 1990s and the purchase of part of the land, about 9 hectares, by the Autonomous Province of Bolzano. A portion of the existing buildings will be immediately demolished in order to set up other companies, while during 2004 the main buildings of the industrial complex will be placed under historical monumental protection: the two power plants, the "Bolzano 1" and the "Bolzano 2", and the buildings in front of the street, once destined to the concierge, management and canteen. At this point, the debate on their possible use starts. Many people support their use in museums, especially in view of the great success of the art biennial Manifesta 7 hosted in the factory in spring-summer 2008. The finalist projects submitted to the international competition for the design of the area involve a mixed-use of the existing buildings: one as a business incubator and the other as a museum. In the end, the choice points straight towards the idea of a new innovation district, capable of bringing together in one place the Free University of Bozen-Bolzano, the various research centers scattered throughout the area (Fraunhofer Italia, Eurac Research, ClimateHouse, Research Centre Laimburg and others) and private companies, in order to stimulate collaboration, for the progress of the economy and companies in the area.

== Certifications ==
The entire district is the first in Europe to be LEED Gold certified, a certification that guarantees the sustainability of the entire project from an environmental point of view.

== Meaning of the name ==
View of the district from the main entrance

The name "NOI" is the acronym of "Nature of Innovation" and expresses the intentions at the origin of the structure, which intends to generate innovation by following the example of nature itself: sustainability and adaptability are the two basic concepts. The natural cycle of life, the circularity of the seasons, the strength with which nature seeks and implements its expedients, the principles that make it so capable of balancing, adapting, and resisting should be transferable - in this sense - to the acts and products of companies and start-ups in the five leading sectors identified: sustainability, food, digital technologies, automotive industry and automation.

== Cultural and public events ==
Summer at NOI is an annual series of cultural and innovation-themed events held at NOI Techpark during the summer months. The program features open-air concerts, DJ sets, public lectures, and the "Cinema meets Opera" series, introduced by renowned tenor Saimir Pirgu. In 2025, Swiss-Lebanese artist Khalil Berro presented BREATHE as part of the program. The "Entertain the Future" series, in collaboration with Transart, explores topics such as artificial intelligence and digital art.

== Bibliography ==
- Mulazzani, Marco (2018). NOI Techpark, la fabbrica della ricerca. Photos by Alessandra Chemollo [NOI Techpark, the research factory] (in Italian). Mondadori Electa. ISBN 9788891819147.
- franzLAB (Ed., 2026). JOSEF. The insider's travel book to NOI Techpark. Texts by Anna Quinz, Maria Quinz, Verena Spechtenhauser, Kunigunde Weissensteiner. History check by Hannes Obermair. 143 pp. Bozen-Bolzano.
