= WCP =

WCP may refer to:

- Wet concentration plant, for processing heavy minerals
- Wing Commander: Prophecy, a 1997 computer game
- Wing Commander: Privateer, a 1993 computer game
- Worcester Park railway station, in South London.
- Workers' Communist Party of Canada, a Canadian political party.
- World Climate Programme, an initiative started in 1979
- World Cup of Poker, a former poker tournament
- WCP (Wide DC electric passenger), a classification of Indian locomotives
