= Liu Zhenmin =

Chinese diplomat

- 刘振民
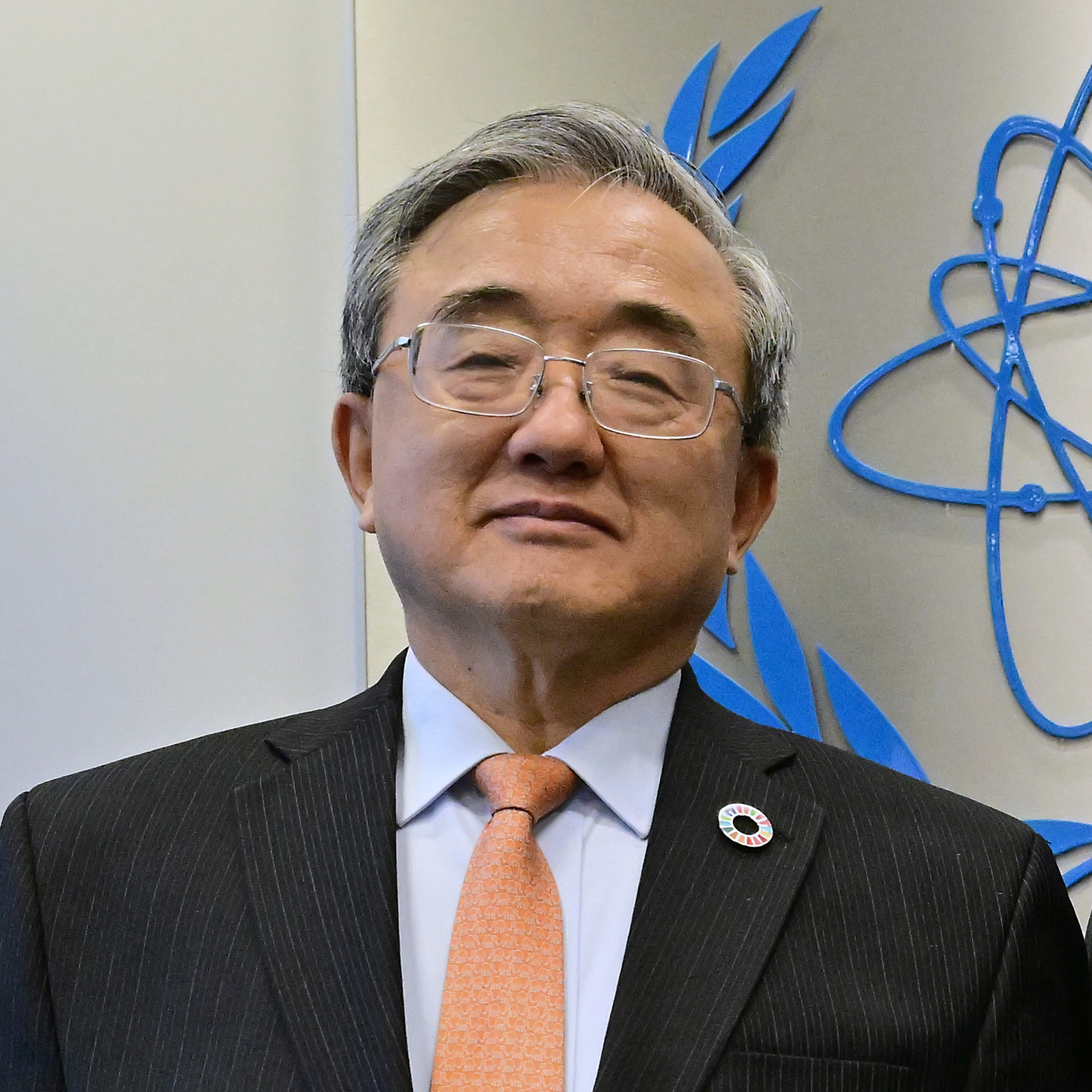
- Liu in 2026

China's special climate envoy
- Incumbent
- Assumed office January 2024
- Preceded by: Xie Zhenhua

United Nations Under-Secretary-General for Economic and Social Affairs
- In office 26 July 2017 – 25 July 2022
- António Guterres
- Preceded by: Wu Hongbo
- Succeeded by: Li Junhua

Personal details
- Born: August 1955 (age 71) Lanxian, Lüliang, Shanxi, China
- Party: Chinese Communist Party
- Education: Peking University
- Occupation: Diplomat

Liu Zhenmin (Chinese: 刘振民; born August 1955) is a Chinese diplomat who was named as the country's special envoy for climate change on 12 January 2024. Previously he had served as the Under-Secretary-General for the United Nations Department of Economic and Social Affairs (DESA) from 2017 to 2022. He was appointed to that position effective on 26 July 2017. Prior to that he had served as Vice-Minister for Foreign Affairs of China after a thirty-year career in the Ministry of Foreign Affairs of the People's Republic of China. While at DESA, Liu promoted China's Belt and Road Initiative.

== Education and early career ==
Liu holds a Master of Laws from the Law School of Peking University.

== Selected bibliography ==
- Liu Zhenmin (24 April 2018) "Time for a Global Financial Makeover", Project Syndicate.
