= Rachel Kyte =

British academic

Rachel Kyte CMG
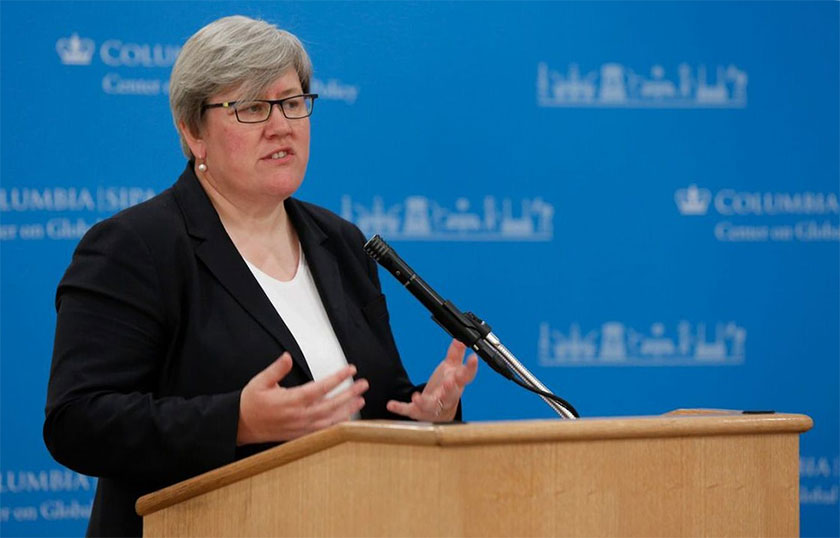

UK Special Representative for Climate
- Incumbent
- Assumed office 21 October 2024-Present
- Appointed by: UK Government

Professor of Practice in Climate Policy, Blavatnik School of Government, University of Oxford
- Incumbent
- Assumed office November 2023 - Present

Personal details
- Born: 1965 (age 60–61)
- Education: University of London (BA); Tufts University (MA)

Rachel Elizabeth Kyte CMG (born 1965) is a climate diplomat, academic and international climate, energy and development policy expert serving as the UK Government's climate envoy since October 2024. She is a Professor of Practice in Climate Policy at the Blavatnik School of Government, University of Oxford. and Dean Emerita at The Fletcher School at Tufts University where she served from October 2019 to June 2023, the first woman to lead the oldest graduate-only school of international affairs in the United States. She previously served as the Chief Executive Officer of Sustainable Energy for All, and as Special Representative of the United Nations Secretary-General for Sustainable Energy for All.

== Early life and education ==
Kyte was born in Aylesbury, Buckinghamshire, England in 1965, and raised in Boston, Lincolnshire. She earned a Bachelor of Arts degree in history and politics from the University of London and a master's degree in international relations from the Fletcher School of Law and Diplomacy.

== Career ==
Kyte has focused on affordable, reliable, and sustainable energy as the key to combating both poverty and climate change. From 2016 to 2019, Kyte managed SEforALL's work to mobilise action towards its 2030 goals of ensuring universal access to modern energy services; doubling the global rate of improvement in energy efficiency; and doubling the share of renewable energy in the global energy mix. As Special Representative for the Secretary-General, she was also the point person in the United Nations for action towards the Sustainable Development Goal 7 on sustainable energy.

Kyte served until December 2015 as World Bank Group Vice-President and Special Envoy for Climate Change, leading the Bank Group's efforts to campaign for an ambitious agreement at the 21st Convention of the Parties of the UNFCCC (COP 21). She was previously World Bank Vice-President for Sustainable Development and was the International Finance Corporation Vice-President for Business Advisory Services.

Kyte served as dean of The Fletcher School from October 2019 to June 2023, after which she was named Dean Emerita. On June 22, 2023, Kyte announced her intent to step down as Dean of the Fletcher School almost immediately, effective June 30, 2023.

She was appointed Companion of the Order of St Michael and St George (CMG) in the 2020 New Year Honours for services to energy and combating climate change.

Kyte joined the advisory board of General Atlantic's climate change fund, BeyondNetZero, in July 2021.

On 21 October 2024, she was appointed UK Special Representative for Climate by the British Government. In June 2025, Kyte was criticised in the news for her carbon footprint. According to one report, "Kyte has clocked up 250,000 miles worth of official flights in less than two years in the job – and that includes business-class trips to glamorous locations such as Rio de Janeiro, Seoul and Barbados." This places Kyte in the top 1% of the world's carbon emitters.

Kyte is cited as a key diplomatic figure managing the friction between the UK's global net-zero commitments and domestic pressure to grant controversial new oil and gas drilling licenses in the North Sea. She warned in 2026 that governments must respond to climate impacts by investing in infrastructure, including modern transmission networks and safeguards against rising temperatures and volatile weather.

== See also ==
- Sustainable Development
- Sustainable Development Goals
- Sustainable Energy for All
- Fletcher School of Law and Diplomacy
- United Nations
- University of London
- World Bank Group
