= Khalil Berro =

Swiss-Lebanese Contemporary Artist

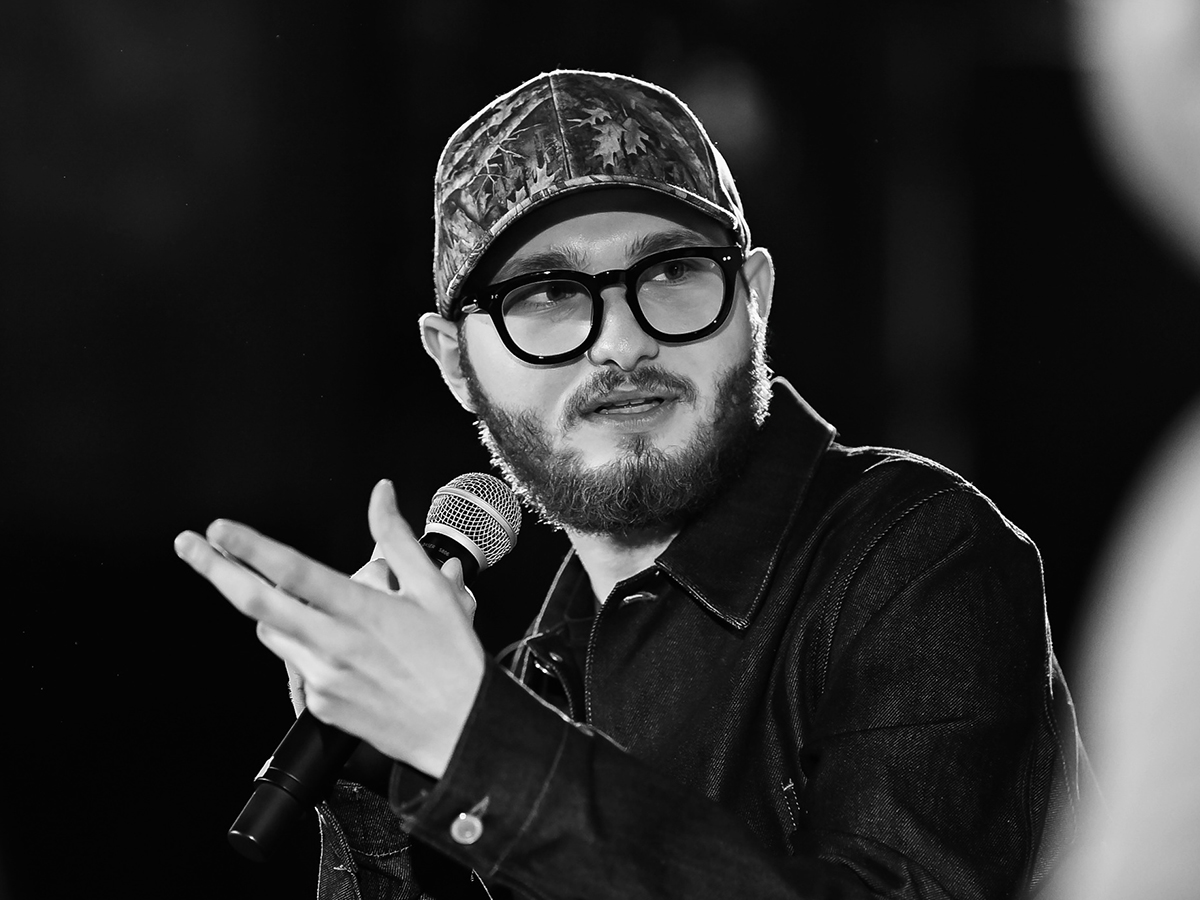
- Khalil Berro in 2025
- Website: khalilberro.com

Khalil Berro is a Swiss-Lebanese contemporary artist, living and working in Zürich and Bedretto, who works across film, sculpture, public intervention, and installation. Central to Berro’s practice is the act of meaning-making, expanding ideas of desire, awe, and ambition as central drivers of human experience.

== Work ==
Berro's work investigates contemporary desires for energy, power, and material objects, while examining instances in which minerals, objects, and non-human entities influence or even override human agency. His practice is rooted in field expeditions and scientific collaborations, often to remote sites, including decommissioned and active coal mines, Alpine peaks, glaciers, palm oil plantations in Indonesia, and the oil and gas fields of Zhanaozen in western Kazakhstan.

One of his notable projects, Breathe, is a public art installation that re-imagines reality through the origins of the air. The work was developed in collaboration with Dr. Michael Armand Sprenger, Dr. Hanna Joos, and Prof. Dr. Heini Wernli from the Department of Environmental Systems Science at ETH Zurich. The installation uses real-time calculations to trace air parcels' journeys over the past 30 days. The trajectories are displayed in a ticker-style font, accompanied by excerpts from conversations with scientists, poems, and other collected materials. The work questions human belief systems and concepts of nature by connecting distant realities and events to local and immediate contexts. The work was first exhibited at NOI Techpark in Bolzano, Italy, from July to August 2024. This was followed by installations at the Embassy of Switzerland in Washington, D.C., in September 2024; at the main building of ETH Zurich in Zurich, Switzerland, later that same month; and at the Modern Art Museum Shanghai in Shanghai, China, in April 2025.

The Fires We Started, first exhibited in Bedretto, Switzerland, examines the desires, and sense of estrangement associated with the materials that fuel the modern world, bringing them in dialogue with their primordial origins. The work examines coal, tracing its formation back to the Carboniferous period. Through sculptures, coal manipulations, and fieldwork, including explorations of coal mines in Switzerland, Germany, and the Svalbard archipelago, Berro investigates humanity's relationship with fossil fuels.

In August 2023, Berro published Cloud Killer, a work group and book in which cloud structures were altered by launching rockets into them. The work questions atmospheric ownership and humanity’s relationship with water resources, particularly in the context of technologies like cloud seeding, and has stirred mild public outrage over the implications of weather manipulation.

Berro was a speaker at Swissnex Day 2024, which focused on the theme of Planetary Thinking. In 2025, Berro participated as a member of the Swiss delegation and speaker at the Shanghai Climate Ring during Shanghai Climate Week and is a recurring guest speaker at the Zurich School of Design.
