= Swissnex =

Swiss education and research network

Swissnex is a network of education, research, innovation and art outposts aimed at connecting Switzerland with the world's innovation hubs. The network is managed by the State Secretariat for Education, Research and Innovation (SERI) in cooperation with the Federal Department of Foreign Affairs (FDFA). There are currently six main Swissnex branches: Boston (2000) and New York (2015), San Francisco (2003), Shanghai, China (2008), Bangalore, India (2011) and Rio de Janeiro, Brazil and São Paulo (2013), and Osaka, Japan (2023). One Swissnex office operated in Singapore from 2004 to 2015.

Since 2003, the network has relied on public and private funding (one third from the SERI and two thirds from other sources). Each Swissnex branch offers a variety of services to Swiss companies, academics, policy-makers, and others.

The SERI also maintains and develops a worldwide network of science and technology counselors sharing the Swissnex mission. Twelve science and technology counselors work at selected Swiss embassies.

== Swissnex in Boston and New York ==
Swissnex in Boston, the network's first location, opened in 2000 to pioneer “science diplomacy" in Cambridge, Massachusetts. Situated strategically between the Massachusetts Institute of Technology and Harvard University, Swissnex in Boston and New York works closely with higher education institutions in both Switzerland and the Greater Northeastern US. The region, due to its highly dynamic startup ecosystem and leading role in biotech and biomedical research, is also fertile ground for Swissnex in Boston's startup programs.

In 2013, Swissnex in Boston and New York opened the New York Outpost in Manhattan. Since 2016, the office is actively involved in the planning of Swissnex mobile, as part of the Swiss Pavilion at the Expo 2017 in Kazakhstan.

In 2024, Swissnex in Boston and New York pioneered the Climate Ring during Climate Week NYC.

== Swissnex in San Francisco ==
Swissnex in San Francisco is located at pier 17. Services offered by Swissnex in San Francisco include public events, study tours, startup coaching, innovation consulting, press outreach, social media training, university affairs, alumni networking, workspace, and more. Swissnex in San Francisco hosts the three-month CTI Start-up US Market Entry Camp for Swiss startups, and worked on a two-year social media program for all Swiss institutions of higher education, now called the Digital Campus. Public events organized by Swissnex in San Francisco cover topics from augmented reality to astronomy to innovative design. It also maintains a blog called nextrends that reports news and insights from the American West in the fields of science, education, innovation.

== Swissnex in China ==
Swissnex in China, the Science Consulate of Switzerland in China, was founded in 2008 and is located in the heart of Shanghai. Working together with the Science, Education and Technology Section at the Embassy of Switzerland in China and Consulates-General in Chengdu, Guangzhou, Hong Kong and Shanghai, Swissnex in China connects the dots between Switzerland and China in science, research, education and innovation. The main goal of Swissnex in China is to establish a network of cooperation between Swiss and Chinese academics and researchers, serving as a base for bottom-up initiatives, as well as to help Swiss startups to prepare their first step in China, to discover the market, to meet professional coaches and to connect with local experts. Public events organized by Swissnex in China cover the future of work, AI, circular economy, quantum computing, fintech, sustainable design, and more.

Swissnex in China has also organized the Climate Ring in Shanghai in 2025, a program featuring symposiums with Prof. Tobias Brosch, Dr. Elena Cima, Dr. Zhongming Shi, and more, as well as an exhibition by Khalil Berro.

== Swissnex in India ==
Swissnex in India, part of the global Swissnex network, operates under the Consulate General of Switzerland and is based in Bengaluru, India’s startup capital and a leading education and research hub. Located near the central business district, Swissnex in India serves as a bridge between Switzerland and India in the fields of education, research, innovation, and art.

Swissnex in India aims to connect Switzerland and India in education, research, and innovation. In collaboration with Innosuisse, it supports Swiss startups through programs for market exploration and entry in India. Swissnex also facilitates academic partnerships, organizes public events on science and technology, supports Swiss university alumni, and provides collaborative workspaces for researchers and entrepreneurs.

== Swissnex in Brazil ==
Swissnex in Brazil was first opened in Rio de Janeiro, in 2014. The office was inaugurated with the presence of the Federal Councillor Johann Schneider-Ammann, at the time head of the Federal Department of Economic Affairs, Education and Research. The Brazilian office was expanded with an outpost in São Paulo in October 2016.

== Swissnex in Japan ==
Swissnex in Japan, Consulate of Switzerland, is located in Osaka and is the newest Swissnex location. On 24th of July 2021, the President of the Swiss Confederation, H.E. Guy Parmelin, announced the opening of a new Consulate of Switzerland in Osaka, Japan and the 6th Swissnex key location. Swiss President Ignazio Cassis held the groundbreaking ceremony in the new Consulate offices on April 20, 2022, officially making Japan the 6th Swissnex location.

== Inactive locations ==
=== Swissnex Singapore ===
Swissnex Singapore opened in 2004 and ceased its operations by the end of September 2015. The remaining two staff members from SERI have been transferred to the Science and Technology Office at the local FDFA office, the Embassy of Switzerland, Singapore.

== See also ==
- Employment website
- Switzerland
- Education in Switzerland
- Science and technology in Switzerland
