= World Climate Change Conference, Moscow =

Conference in 2003

The World Climate Change Conference was held in Moscow from September 29 to October 3, 2003. The initiative of convening the Conference was taken by Vladimir Putin, the President of the Russian Federation. The Conference was convened by the Russian Federation, and supported by international bodies including the United Nations. It should not be confused with the World Climate Conferences.

== Comments ==
The conference summary report , which was endorsed at concluding session of the Conference, October 3, 2003, endorsed the consensus represented by the IPCC TAR:

The Intergovernmental Panel on Climate Change (IPCC) has provided the basis for much of our present understanding of knowledge in this field in its Third Assessment Report (TAR) in 2001. A large majority of the international scientific community has accepted its general conclusions that climate change is occurring, is primarily a result of human emissions of greenhouse gases and aerosols, and that this represents a threat to people and ecosystems. Some divergent scientific interpretations were brought forward and discussed in the Conference.

Andreas Fischlin, conference participant and IPCC author was critical of the conference, saying:

However, concerning the scientific content of the conference, we had also to struggle with considerable difficulties. Unfortunately, there were not only leading scientists present, but also some colleagues who used the conference to express personal, political opinions based on value judgement instead of scientific facts and rigorously derived, scientific insights and thorough understanding. Thereby, I believe, principles of proper scientific conduct were violated too often and sometimes, I am afraid having to say so, even systematically. This contrasts sharply with the principles upheld by the IPCC (Intergovernmental Panel on Climate Change), which allow only to assess the current knowledge based on the best available, peer reviewed scientific literature and which do not allow for any non-scientific value judgements, let alone policy recommendations.
