= Fareed Mustafa Kamil Yasseen =

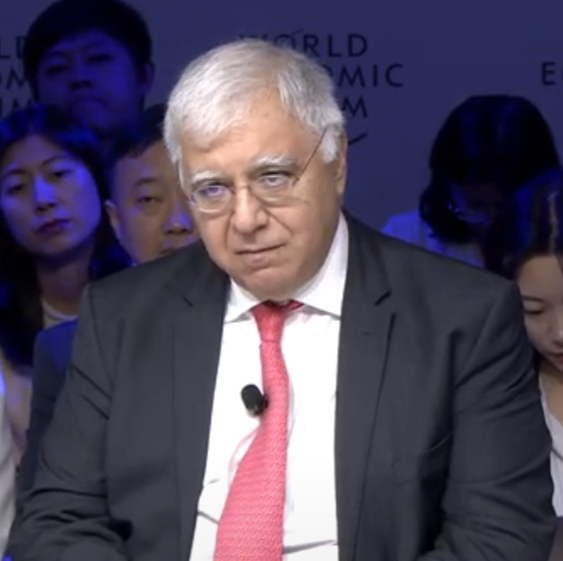
- At a WEF meeting in June 2024
- Born: 1956 (age 69–70); Baghdad, Iraq
- Education: École Polytechnique Fédérale de Lausanne
- Occupations: Physicist, politician, activist, diplomat

Dr. Fareed Yasseen (born 1956) is an Iraqi physicist, politician, activist and diplomat. Most recently, Yasseen served as the Iraqi Ambassador to the United States. Yasseen joined Iraq's Ministry of Foreign Affairs in July 2004, and previously served as the head of the ministry's Department of Policy Planning. He has also served as diplomatic adviser to Deputy President Adil Abd al-Mahdi and, prior to his posting in Washington, as Ambassador to France.

== Early life ==
Fareed Yassen is the son of Mustafa Kamil Yasseen, a former Iraqi politician and diplomat who defected after Saddam Hussein's rise to power, and Shahzanan Shakarchi, who was a university professor and author. Born and raised in Baghdad, Yasseen graduated from Baghdad College, an elite all-boys high school in Baghdad, in 1974. Yassseen went on to study in Europe and the United States for his formal education, and in 1981 received an undergraduate engineering degree (diplôme d'ingénieur physicien) and PhD (docteur ès sciences physiques) in physics, both from the École Polytechnique Fédérale de Lausanne. He has worked and consulted for various start-ups, think tanks, and UN agencies, in particular, the Secretariat of the UN Framework Convention on Climate Change, where he led pioneering notable efforts in the use of the Internet. He is a Member of the American Physical Society and the International Institute for Strategic Studies. In 2016, he was Awarded the Robert and JoAnn Bendetsen Public Diplomacy Award at Tufts University, and was made Commander of France's National Order of the Legion of Honor.

As of 2022, following his career as an Iraqi diplomat, Yasseen serves as the country's Climate Envoy.
