= Resurrection ecology =

"Resurrection ecology" is an evolutionary biology technique whereby researchers hatch dormant eggs from lake sediments to study animals as they existed decades ago. It is a new approach that might allow scientists to observe evolution as it occurred, by comparing the animal forms hatched from older eggs with their extant descendants. This technique is particularly important because the live organisms hatched from egg banks can be used to learn about the evolution of behavioural, plastic or competitive traits that are not apparent from more traditional paleontological methods.

One such researcher in the field is W. Charles Kerfoot of Michigan Technological University whose results were published in the journal Limnology and Oceanography. He reported on success in a search for "resting eggs" of zooplankton that are dormant in Portage Lake on Michigan's Upper Peninsula. The lake has undergone a considerable amount of change over the last 100 years including flooding by copper mine debris, dredging, and eutrophication. Others have used this technique to explore the evolutionary effects of eutrophication, predation, and metal contamination. Resurrection ecology provided the best empirical example of the "Red Queen Hypothesis" in nature. Any organism that produces a resting stage can be used for resurrection ecology. However, the most frequently used organism is the water flea, Daphnia. This genus has well-established protocols for lab experimentation and usually asexually reproduces allowing for experiments on many individuals with the same genotype.

Although the more esoteric demonstration of natural selection is alone a valuable aspect of the study described, there is a clear ecological implication in the discovery that very old zooplankton eggs have survived in the lake: the potential still exists, if and when this environment is restored to something of a more pristine nature, for at least some of the original (pre-disturbance) inhabitants to re-establish populations once presumed lost. The genes valuable to survival of those species in a restored environment are still "readily" available and may be quickly assimilated by the modern populations, perhaps requiring no more than a fortuitous disturbance of the bottom.

== See also ==
- Limnology
- Paleoecology
