= New Zealand Ecological Restoration Network =

New Zealand Ecological Restoration Network (NZERN) is an environmental organisation dedicated to protecting and restoring the biodiversity of New Zealand.
