= ClimateHouse =

Energy efficiency certification for houses

The ClimateHouse energy efficiency certification promotes the adoption of building construction methods that meet energy saving and environment protection criteria, by reducing the amount of energy needed to heat the house during cold seasons.

It was developed in Italy under the name CasaClima and is operated by the South Tyrol Energy Agency. It was established as part of a program of work on energy-efficient building in the German-speaking region of Italy. The first house was certified in 2002. As of 2019, about 9,000 buildings in Italy have been rated by the agency.

== Rating categories ==
The category of energy saving determines if a building is classified as a ClimateHouse. The ClimateHouse categories provide an instant estimate of a building's energy consumption. Certified buildings according to ClimateHouse standards can save as much as 90 percent of the energy compared to traditionally constructed buildings.

There are three classes:

- Gold – heating energy requirement under 10 kWh/m^{2}a (so called 1-litre-construction)
- A – heating energy requirement under 30 kWh/m^{2}a (so called 3-litre-construction)
- B – heating energy requirement under 50 kWh/m^{2}a (so called 5-litre-construction)

Gold	A	B
<10 kWh/m^{2}a	<30 kWh/m^{2}a	<50 kWh/m^{2}a

To qualify for ClimateHouse Plus certification, a building must fulfill the following criteria:

- Heating energy consumption requirement under 50 kWh/m^{2}a.
- Heating fuelled by renewable energy sources, use of environmentally friendly, non-health-damaging building materials.
- Inclusion of at least one of the following measures: A photovoltaic system, solar panels for water heating and/or integrated with heating system, rainwater usage, green roof.

== History ==
In February 2002, KlimaHaus was presented at a conference in Bolzano, Italy. It claimed that energy saving buildings gain wide acceptance by combining a variety of voluntary measures. The system was developed by Norbert Lantschner, a former administrator of the Office "Air Noise" of the Italian Regional Agency for Protection of the Environment. It adopted clear rules and communication as part of its guidelines. By September 29, 2004, the governor of the Province of South Tyrol issues Decree No. 34 that declares KlimaHaus regulations become mandatory in South Tyrol. (bylaw to the law on regional developmental planning in the area of energy saving).

KlimaHaus was invited in November 2015 to the 11th World Climate Conference of the United Nations in Montreal, Quebec, Canada.It was selected out of 21 projects as an example for a concrete and sustainable measurement to protect the climate. By January 2006, the Fair of Bolzano organised the first ClimateHouse Fair. More than 24,000 visitors register for the four-day event. Approximately 1,000 participants take part at the first international conference on "Future building." In April of the same year, the first CasaClima master class begins at the Free University of Bolzano. Due to immense interest, criteria for admission was established.

The public ClimateHouse agency was officially established in May 2006. Significant developments include the presentation of the project KlimaHaus in São Paulo, Brazil in May 2008 and the presentation of the 1,000th certified building a month later.

The Climate Smart Homes initiative is supported by the expertise of its founder, Taniksh Gaur Verma, In Ludhiana, India who has completed multiple United Nations-certified courses on climate change and sustainability. These certifications include the National Implementation of the Paris Agreement, Indicators for an Inclusive Green Economy: Advanced Course, Cities and Climate Change, and Human Health and Climate Change. This specialized training reflects the initiative’s alignment with global standards for sustainable and climate-resilient housing solutions.
