= Maryland Conservation Council =

Coalition of environmental organizations

- Abbreviation: MCC
- Type: Nonprofit
- Tax ID no.: 23-7001631
- Legal status: 501(c)(4)
- Headquarters: Cockeysville, Maryland
- Board President: Paulette Hammond
- Website: https://www.mdconservationcouncil.org/

The Maryland Conservation Council (MCC) is a coalition of environmental organizations that has been active since the early 1970s. MCC aims to protect the environment in the Chesapeake Bay watershed, with special attention to Maryland. During the Maryland General Assembly legislative session (January through April each year), MCC publishes a weekly legislative update, Conservation Reports. One of MCC's earliest projects involved the protection of Cove Point in Calvert County, Maryland, which resulted in the formation of Cove Point Natural Heritage Trust.

The MCC's Goals are to protect

- Scenic wild rivers and Appalachian hardwood forests in the Allegheny Plateau of Western Maryland;
- Sandy beaches on the barrier islands of the Atlantic Ocean with productive yet fragile bays behind them;
- Cypress swamps along an ancient black water river and vast wetlands providing winter habitat for migrating waterfowl on the Coastal Plain of the Eastern Shore;
- Geologically significant features and species rich forests and rivers in the Piedmont;
- The Chesapeake Bay and its tributaries which once produced vast quantities of aquatic resources.

Conservationists today are faced with a serious dilemma. They are certain that the use of fossil fuels is leading toward a global catastrophe. But at the same time they are increasingly aware that many types of renewable energy, because of the large amount of land that they require, will have a seriously detrimental impact on the natural world, especially if their use expands.

The MCC has concluded that nuclear energy, which produces no carbon dioxide or other greenhouse gases, (1) also has a smaller footprint or impact on biological diversity compared to wind, solar, or biomass; in some cases, orders of magnitude smaller. When cost is stripped of various forms of governmental assistance, and the actual, not theoretical, effectiveness is used to calculate the size of the installation needed to generate a given amount of electricity, nuclear power is the least expensive.

The MCC has also concluded that commercial reactors of the type now used in the United States have a sound safety record, even considering the accident at Three Mile Island (TMI), and that there is no credible evidence that there has been harm to health by these reactors. MCC further concluded that the hazards of transporting used nuclear fuel have been badly exaggerated, and that recent proposals about the storage of used fuel will reduce the technological difficulty of construction a long-term repository.

The MCC's Board voted at its November 2007 meeting to support Constellation Energy Group’s proposal to build a third nuclear reactor at its Calvert Cliffs Nuclear Power Plant in Charles County.
