= Earth immune system =

Controversial proposal related to the Gaia hypothesis

The Earth immune system is a controversial proposal, claimed to be a consequence of the Gaia hypothesis. The Gaia hypothesis holds that the entire earth may be considered a single organism (Gaia). As a self-maintaining organism, Earth would have an immune system of some sort in order to maintain its health.

Some proponents of this speculative concept, for example, hold that humankind can be considered an "infection" of Gaia, and that AIDS is an attempt by this immune system to reject the infection. "Cancer" might be a more accurate term, as humans evolved within Gaia, and are not external invaders. An opposite view is that humankind is Gaia's immune system itself, perhaps evolved to avert future catastrophes such as the Permian and Cretaceous mass extinctions of species.

James Lovelock's book "The Revenge of Gaia" suggests that Gaia has many mechanisms for eliminating civilizations that do harm through greenhouse gas emissions and global warming, but suggests that with increasing heat being received from the sun, Gaia's ability to "bounce back" as it did after the Permian and Cretaceous extinction events, may be increasingly compromised.

Paul Hawken suggests in Blessed Unrest that when Earth is considered a living system then Earth's immune system is made up of the million or so organizations all around the globe that are working for social justice, the environment, and indigenous people's rights. Many of these groups are linked through the Internet and other means so there is a vast network of interconnected people and groups working to protect the planet, its people, and all beings. For example, one organization that serves to link groups working on sustainable energy is Inforse in Denmark.

== See also ==
- Gaia hypothesis
- Gaia philosophy
- Geophysiology
