= Climate Monitoring and Diagnostics Laboratory =

US Climate Research body

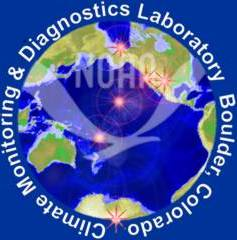

The Climate Monitoring and Diagnostics Laboratory (CMDL) was a climate laboratory in the National Oceanic and Atmospheric Administration (NOAA)/Office of Oceanic and Atmospheric Research (OAR). In October 2005, it was merged with five other NOAA labs to form the Earth System Research Laboratories.

CMDL's mission was to observe and understand, through accurate, long-term records of atmospheric gases, aerosol particles, and solar radiation, the Earth's atmospheric system controlling climate forcing, ozone depletion and baseline air quality, in order to develop products that will advance global and regional environmental information and services.
