= Roads to Resources Program =

Transport program in Canada

The Roads to Resources Program was initiated by the Progressive Conservative government of Prime Minister of Canada John Diefenbaker from 1957 to 1963.

The program was intended to complete transportation infrastructure in remote areas of Canada to facilitate easier access to minerals and encourage their exploitation.

According to a release on 26 March 1958 from the Department of Northern Affairs and National Resource, roads to be started or completed under the program:

- Dempster Highway, Yukon Highway 5 - the plan was a 170-mile road to the south edge of Eagle Plains, then a fork with one road 70 miles (110 km) northwest and another road 160 miles (260 km) northeast to Fort McPherson. Target date to complete was 1962, cost $8,000,000.
- Nahanni Range Road, Yukon Highway 10, plus a section of highway south to Watson Lake that now is part of Yukon Highway 4.
- construction of three bridges on the Klondike Highway in the Yukon over the Yukon, Pelly and Stewart rivers, at a cost of $3,500,000.
- renovation of roadway and bridges to reopen the southern part of the Canol Road as far as Ross River, cost $270,000.
- Clinton Creek Road, from west of Dawson to Clinton Creek, cost $500,000, as a branch off the Sixtymile Road.
- Great Slave-Great Bear Road: the first stage, from the future location of Enterprise to Yellowknife, 300 miles, to be completed in 1960 at a cost of $10,000,000, plus two major bridges, and either a third bridge or a ferry at the Mackenzie River; the second stage, which was never built, was another 250 miles, at a cost of $5,000,000, from Rae to Sawmill Bay on Great Bear Lake
- hard surfacing of the 24 mile portage road from Fitzgerald to Bell Rock portage, cost $1,500,000 - this was never done
- new 78-mile road from Peace Point through and to the west boundary of Wood Buffalo National Park, cost $2,500,000 - this was intended to tie in with an Alberta government roadway from Fort Vermilion that was never completed to Peace Point; little, if any, of this 78-mile road appears to have ever been built
