= 2006 Danvers Chemical fire =

Industrial disaster

Coordinates: 42.5476°N 70.9195°W

The 2006 Danvers Chemical fire took place at approximately 2:46 a.m. Eastern Standard Time on Wednesday, November 22, 2006. An explosion occurred at the plant of solvent and ink manufacturer CAI Inc., located in the Danversport area of Danvers, Massachusetts, which it shared with paint manufacturer Arnel. The explosion was caught on video by a security camera and was reportedly heard up to 50 miles (80 km) away in southern Maine and New Hampshire. Arnel ceased operations after the blast.

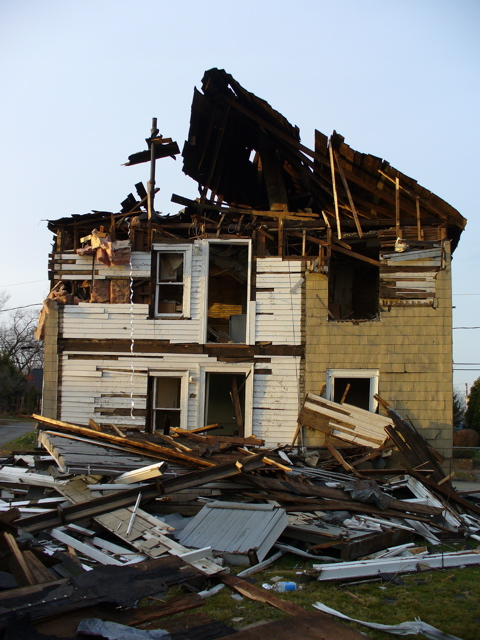
A damaged building at the site of the explosion

== Cause ==
A May 13, 2008 report from the U.S. Chemical Safety Board (CSB) attributed the explosion to a heated ink-mixing tank containing flammable solvents that was unintentionally left on overnight. The CSB stated that the accident could have been prevented with a simple alarm system or automatic shutoff.

== Damage ==
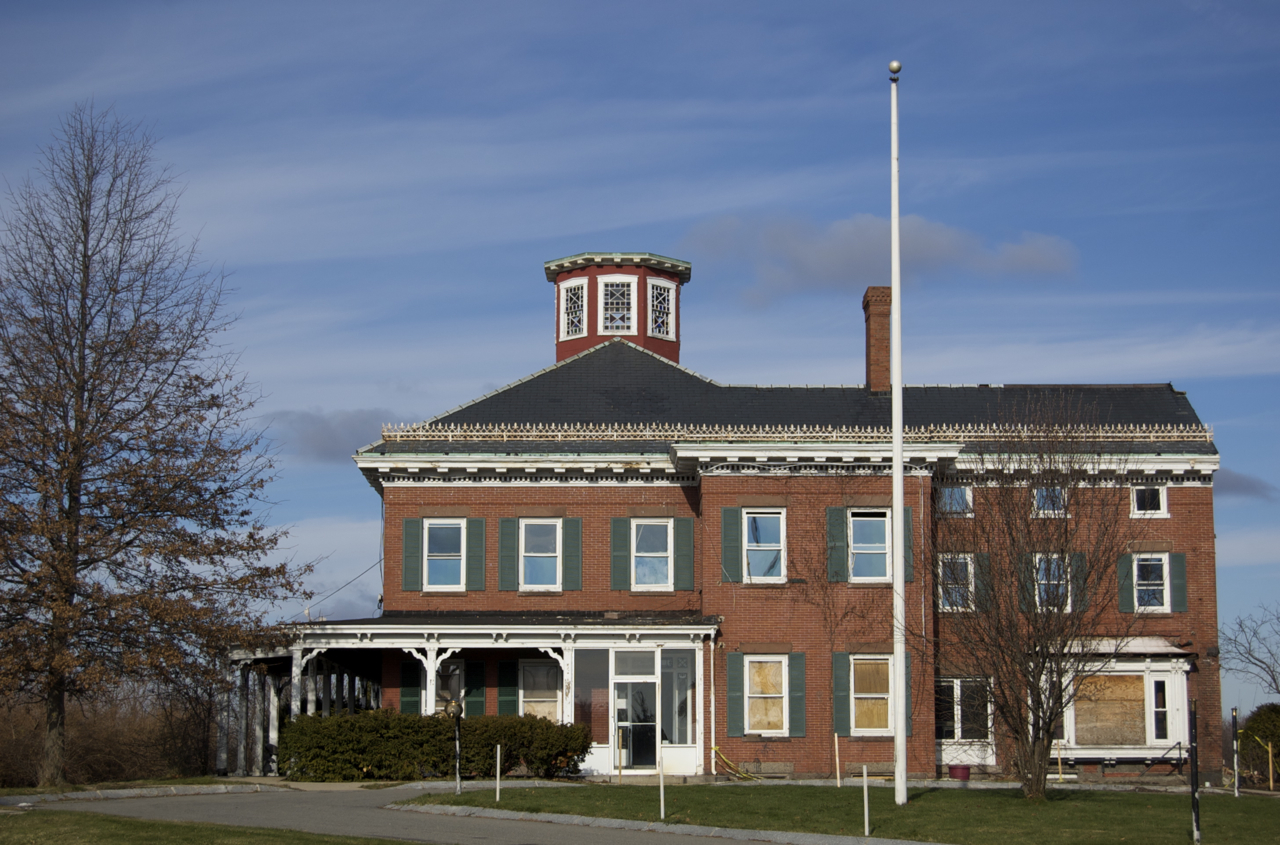
The New England Home for the Deaf was boarded up after the explosion only a few hundred yards away.

Although no one was killed in the blast, it damaged over 90 homes, broke windows and separated buildings from their foundations. Officials believed that some of the more damaged structures would have to be demolished and rebuilt. Damage to businesses included a bakery, boats at a nearby marina, and New England Homes for the Deaf, an assisted-living facility for people who are deaf, deafblind, elderly, or otherwise require constant care. "These people are extremely fragile," said state Rep. Ted Speliotis (D-Danvers), whose district includes the affected area. "Many of them have Alzheimer's and other illnesses. It's clear they can't stay here long, but it's clear they won't be able to return for quite a while."

Danvers Fire Chief James P. Tutko described the area as looking like "a war zone." He stated that many residents would be kept from their homes for the foreseeable future. Remarking on the lack of fatalities, Tutko said, "Somebody out there likes us."

Outgoing governor Mitt Romney toured the area and said it was a "Thanksgiving miracle" that no one was killed, as the explosion was "equivalent to a 2,000 lb bomb going off in a residential neighborhood." In an area that included over 300 residents, 10 people reported minor injuries. Residents of the area were evacuated to Danvers High School, where temporary shelter was set up by the Massachusetts chapter of the American Red Cross. Donations were taken for residents affected by the explosion. Residents were also advised to start filing insurance claims right away and to keep track of their expenses.
