= School of Environmental Studies =

School of Environmental Studies may refer to:

- NDHU College of Environmental Studies and Oceanography
- School of Environmental Studies, Minnesota
- School of Environmental Studies Delhi University
- Yale School of the Environment
- Queen's School of Environmental Studies, a unit at Queen's University in Ontario, Canada
- Indiana University School of Public and Environmental Affairs
- Environmental Studies Concentration at Soka University of America beginning Fall 2008
- University of Guelph Faculty of Environmental Sciences
- University of Waterloo Faculty of Environment
- York University Faculty of Environmental Studies
