= Conservation designation =

Explains the status of an area of land

A conservation designation is a name and/or acronym which explains the status of an area of land in terms of conservation or protection.

== Examples ==
=== United Kingdom ===
- Area of Outstanding Natural Beauty (AONB)
- Environmentally sensitive area (ESA)
- Local nature reserve (LNR)
- Marine nature reserve (MNR)
- National nature reserve (NNR)
- National scenic area (NSA)
- Nitrate vulnerable zone (NVZ)
- Site of Special Scientific Interest (SSSI)

For a comprehensive list, see Conservation in the United Kingdom

=== European Union ===
- Special Area of Conservation
- Special Protection Area

=== United States ===
Wildlands Project

=== Multi-national ===
- Under the Berne Convention
  - Areas of Special Conservation Interest (ASCI)
- Ramsar site

== See also ==
- Environmental agreement
