= World Climate Programme =

Organization

- Abbreviation: WCP
- Formation: 1979
- Type: INGO
- Region served: Worldwide
- Official language: English, French
- Parent organization: World Meteorological Organization
- Website: WCP Official website

The World Climate Programme (WCP) was established at the eighth World Meteorological Congress following the first World Climate Conference in 1979. It was created both to increase understanding of the earth's climate system and to apply that knowledge to help societies cope with climate variability and climate change.

The major sponsors are the World Meteorological Organization, United Nations Environment Programme, the Intergovernmental Oceanographic Commission of the United Nations Educational, Scientific and Cultural Organization (UNESCO), and the International Council for Science (ICSU).

== History ==
When it was first established in 1979, the WCIP consisted of four components:

- The World Climate Data Programme (WCDP)
- The World Climate Applications Programme (WCAP)
- The World Climate Impacts Programme (WCIP)
- The World Climate Research Programme (WCRP)

Following the Second World Climate Conference of 1990, the eleventh World Meteorological Congress (1991) reorganized the programme and renamed the four components:

- World Climate Data and Monitoring Programme (WCDMP)
- World Climate Applications and Services Programme (WCASP)
- World Climate Impact Assessment and Response Strategies Programme (WCIRP)
- World Climate Research Programme (WCRP)

In 1993, the Intergovernmental Oceanographic Commission became a co-sponsor of the programme.

After the Third World Climate Conference, the sixteenth World Meteorological Congress (2011) again restructured the program, closing its WCIRP component. Thereafter, the programme included:

- Global Climate Observing System (established in 1992)
- World Climate Research Programme
- World Climate Services Programme (which assumed responsibility for work previously controlled by the WCDMP and the WCASP)

== See also ==
- Global Carbon Project
