= World Climate Conference =

International meeting for global climate change

The World Climate Conferences are a series of international meetings, organized by the World Meteorological Organization (WMO), about global climate issues principally global warming in addition to climate research and forecasting.

== Conferences ==
=== 1979 ===
The First World Climate Conference was held on 12–23 February 1979 in Geneva and sponsored by the WMO. It was one of the first major international meetings on climate change. Essentially a scientific conference, it was attended by scientists from a wide range of disciplines. In addition to the main plenary sessions, the conference organized four working groups to look into climate data, the identification of climate topics, integrated impact studies, and research on climate variability and change. The Conference led to the establishment of the World Climate Programme and the World Climate Research Programme. It also led to the creation of the Intergovernmental Panel on Climate Change (IPCC) by WMO and UNEP in 1988.

=== 1990 ===
The Second Climate Conference was held on 29 October to 7 November 1990, again in Geneva. It was an important step towards a global climate treaty and somewhat more political than the first conference. The main task of the conference was to review the WCP set up by the first conference. The IPCC first assessment report had been completed in time for this conference. The scientists and technology experts at the conference issued a strong statement highlighting the risk of climate change. The conference issued a Ministerial Declaration only after hard bargaining over a number of difficult issues; the declaration disappointed many of the participating scientists as well as some observers because it did not offer a high level of commitment. Eventually, however, developments at the conference led to the establishment of the United Nations Framework Convention on Climate Change (UNFCCC), of which the Kyoto Protocol is a part, and to the establishment of the Global Climate Observing System (GCOS), a global observing system of systems for climate and climate-related observations.

=== 2009 ===
World Climate Conference-3 (WCC-3) was held in Geneva, Switzerland, 31 August – 4 September 2009. Its focus was on climate predictions and information for decision-making at the seasonal to multi-decadal timescales. The goal was to create a global framework that will link scientific advances in these climate predictions and the needs of their users for decision-making to better cope with changing conditions. Key users of climate predictions include food producers, water managers, energy developers and managers, public health workers, national planners, tourism managers and others, as well as society at large. Participants in WCC-3 included these users, as well as climate service providers and high-level policy-makers. The Conference also aimed to increase commitment to, and advancements in, climate observations and monitoring to better provide climate information and services worldwide that will improve public safety and well-being.

WCC-3 outcomes also intended to contribute to the achievement of the United Nations Millennium Development Goals and broader UN climate goals, including the Hyogo Framework for Action on Disaster Risk Reduction. The Conference theme complemented global work under way to help societies adapt to climate change in line with Bali Action Plan, especially the Nairobi Work Programme. The outcomes formed part of WMO input to the 2009 UNFCC COP-15 meeting for climate mitigation in Copenhagen in the December following WCC-3.
