= Convective available potential energy =

Measure of instability in the air as a buoyancy force

On thermodynamic diagrams such as the skew-T log-P, CAPE is proportional to the area of the region separating the temperature of a moist air parcel as it ascends (labeled as the "moist adiabat" in this example) and the surrounding air temperature (labeled as "T").

In meteorology, convective available potential energy (commonly abbreviated as CAPE) is a measure of the capacity of the atmosphere to support the vertical movement of air that can lead to cloud formation and storms. As air rises in an atmosphere, it expands and cools. CAPE exists when a given mass of air (called an air parcel) can ascend and remain warmer than the surrounding air. The warm parcel is less dense than the surrounding air and accelerates upward. While the rate of cooling for an ascending parcel of dry air would quickly cool that parcel below the surrounding air temperature in most cases, water vapor within a parcel of moist air "releases heat" if it condenses. This slows the air parcel's rate of cooling and may keep the parcel warmer than the surrounding air across a particular depth of the atmosphere. The continued ascent of relatively warm and moist air can stimulate the formation of cumulus or cumulonimbus clouds and fuel thunderstorms.

More technically, CAPE is the integrated amount of work that the upward (positive) buoyancy force would perform on a given mass of air if it rose vertically through the entire atmosphere. The computation of CAPE for a given atmospheric environment depends on the initial characteristics ascribed to the hypothetical air parcel, giving rise to specific versions of CAPE like surface-based CAPE (SBCAPE) or most-unstable CAPE (MUCAPE). The presence of nonzero CAPE in an atmospheric sounding is an indicator of convective instability, a necessary condition for the development of cumulus and cumulonimbus clouds with attendant severe weather hazards. Some atmospheric conditions (such as in humid environments with air that cools rapidly with height) support large values of CAPE that can promote strong and sustained upward air movement, resulting in a more conducive environment for thunderstorms.

CAPE is typically expressed in units of Joules per kilogram (J/kg). Values of CAPE in environments conducive to severe weather are often in the thousands of J/kg. Due to the relationship between CAPE and the vertical speeds in the updrafts of storms, the magnitude of CAPE in a given environment can be used as a rough measure for the potential intensity of storms in that setting. Larger values of CAPE can support stronger thunderstorms, but the presence of CAPE alone is not sufficient for storm development.

== Calculation ==
The change in density of a hypothetical parcel of air as it rises up relative to the density of the surrounding air determines where in the atmosphere it can continue rising by buoyancy. The density of an air parcel is based on its temperature, pressure, and water vapor content, provided that its chemical makeup is otherwise constant. CAPE is a measure of the maximum kinetic energy per unit mass that an air parcel can acquire by remaining less dense than its surroundings. This requires an approximation of the change in the parcel's density as it rises. For calculations of CAPE, the hypothetical air parcel is assumed to initially rise and cool at the dry adiabatic lapse rate: the rate at which air cools as it expands without any release of latent heat. Once the parcel cools to the point of saturation, it is then assumed to cool at the moist adiabatic lapse rate: the rate at which air cools adjusted for the release of latent heat from water vapor condensing within the saturated air parcel.

If the parcel of air remains cooler and denser than its surrounding environment under these assumptions, then there is no upward force of buoyancy acting on it. However, in circumstances where the parcel at some altitude becomes warmer and less dense than its environment, it can accelerate upward by the force of buoyancy so long as it remains warmer than the surrounding air, becoming positively buoyant. The parcel can continue to rise buoyantly until it encounters warmer air, reaching a level of neutrally or negative buoyancy. This region of atmosphere within which the parcel can freely rise by buoyancy is known as the free convective layer. Larger positive separations between the environmental temperature and the parcel's temperature result in a stronger upwards buoyant force, contributing greater amounts of kinetic energy to the parcel. CAPE is calculated by vertically integrating the upwards buoyant force between where the parcel first becomes warmer than its surroundings (the level of free convection, or LFC) to where it eventually becomes cooler than its surroundings (the equilibrium level, or EL):

$$\mathrm{CAPE} = \int_{z_\mathrm{f}}^{z_\mathrm{n}} g \left(\frac{T_\mathrm{v,parcel} - T_\mathrm{v,env}}{T_\mathrm{v,env}}\right) \, dz$$

Where $z_\mathrm{f}$ is the height of the level of free convection, $z_\mathrm{n}$ is the height of the equilibrium level, $T_\mathrm{v,parcel}$ is the virtual temperature of the specific parcel, $T_\mathrm{v,env}$ is the virtual temperature of the environment, and $g$ is the acceleration due to gravity. In SI units, CAPE is typically expressed in Joules per kilogram (J/kg) or equivalently as m^{2}/s^{2} (velocity squared). CAPE is often approximated using temperature as opposed to virtual temperature, discounting the impact of moisture on air density. However, neglecting the virtual temperature correction may result in substantial relative errors in the calculated value of CAPE for small CAPE values. For typical daytime atmospheric conditions, accounting for moisture produces larger and more accurate estimates of CAPE. Most calculations of CAPE generally assume that the air parcels involved do not become diluted with air from the surrounding environment and that any cloud droplets formed during the parcel's ascent immediately leaves of the parcel, contributing only latent heat; these underlie a pseudoadiabatic simplification of the parcel's behavior. This simplification also assumes that the changes a parcel undergoes as it rises occur instantaneously. The theoretical parcel ascent also incorporates only the latent heat released by condensation and not the latent heat of fusion released by freezing at colder temperatures.

=== CAPE variants ===
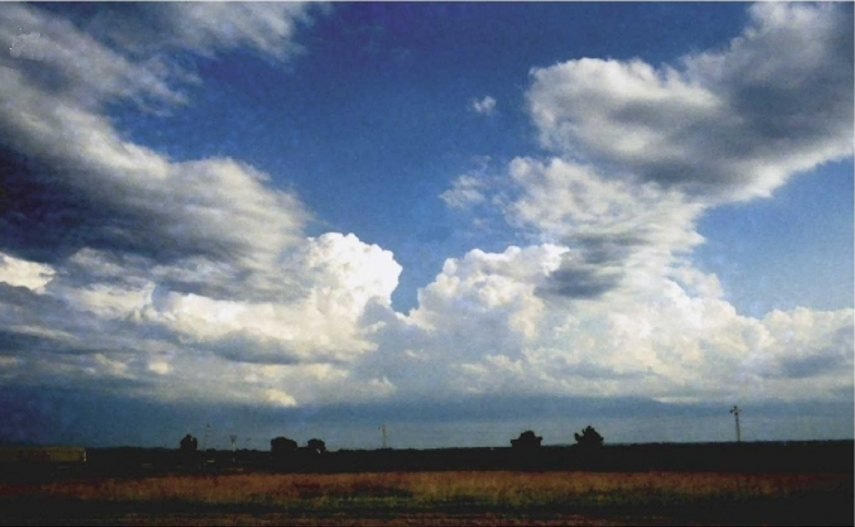
The version of CAPE most representative of convective instability depends on the meteorological environment.

Estimations of CAPE for a given atmospheric environment vary depending on the assumed initial characteristics of the hypothetical air parcel ascending within that environment. The parcel begins with temperature and moisture characteristics of its surroundings but then deviates from those conditions as it rises. If the parcel begins with the temperature and moisture of conditions near the surface, then the resulting calculation is known as surface-based CAPE or SBCAPE. If the parcel is assumed to begin with the average temperature and moisture content of the planetary boundary layer or an average of some other depth of the atmosphere, then the resulting calculation is known as mixed-layer or mean-layer CAPE, or MLCAPE. The most-unstable CAPE, or MUCAPE, is the highest amount of CAPE achievable by a parcel in a given atmospheric environment. MUCAPE may be a more appropriate measure of the buoyant energy available to a thunderstorm with inflow originating well above the surface. SBCAPE is typically higher than MLCAPE in situations supporting thunderstorm development, and MUCAPE is by definition equal to or greater than SBCAPE and MLCAPE. One variant of CAPE may be more or less representative of the convective instability in the environment depending on whether the idealized parcels resemble the actual ascent of air in a given setting, which can vary significantly depending on the time of day, the airmasses involved, and other meteorological differences. While CAPE quantifies instability in the context of air moving directly upward, slantwise CAPE (SCAPE) can be computed in situations where buoyant ascent can be realized if parcels move in some combination of both the horizontal and vertical.

A related quantity to CAPE, normalized CAPE (NCAPE), is calculated by dividing CAPE by the depth of the free convective layer. This correlates with the average buoyancy within the convective layer and provides a sense of the "aspect ratio" of CAPE, distinguishing environments where large amounts of CAPE are accumulated over relatively shallow layer compared to smaller amounts of CAPE distributed over a relatively deep layer of atmosphere. In contrast to pseudoadiabatic CAPE, reversible CAPE (RCAPE) computes convective instability by assuming that all condensate within an air parcel stays with the parcel as it ascends, thermodynamically representing a reversible moist adiabatic process. This calculation is better suited for humid tropical environments such as within tropical cyclones.

The numerical methodology underlying CAPE can also be performed for portions of the atmosphere where an air parcel would be denser and cooler than its surroundings. These areas have negative buoyancy, resulting in the force of buoyancy acting downwards. Integrating within these areas, typically between the surface and the LFC, results in a negative value also known as convective inhibition (CIN). Additional upward forces are required for an air parcel to rise against negative buoyancy, with CIN providing a measure of the work required to overcome negative buoyancy and reach a freely buoyant height. A similar quantity is downdraft CAPE (DCAPE), which integrates the negative buoyancy potentially imparted on an initially saturated parcel as it descends from some arbitrary height to the ground. This measure is used to quantify the potential for downbursts.

== Applications and limitations ==
A hypothetical depiction of an atmospheric sounding in the morning and afternoon as illustrated on a skew-T log-P diagram. Afternoon heating near the surface and cooling aloft results in a potentially unstable atmosphere with an increase in CAPE for parcels originating near the surface. The red line is temperature, the green line is the dew point, and the black line is the temperature of the theoretical air parcel lifted.

On thermodynamic diagrams, CAPE is proportional to the area swept out by the varying temperature of a hypothetical rising air parcel warmer than the surrounding atmosphere. This area is graphically enclosed by the environmental temperature and the parcel's trajectory following its moist adiabatic lapse rate. Parcel trajectories that take large and extended excursions away from the environmental air temperature thus indicate large amounts of CAPE. This potential energy is realized when relatively warm air parcels can rise buoyantly, resulting in a conversion of CAPE to kinetic energy. This occurs within the free convective layer. In the 1960s, meteorologists at the Air Weather Service within the United States Air Force referred to CAPE as positive area, alluding to the enclosed region on thermodynamic diagrams swept out by the temperature of a rising air parcel. The term "convective available potential energy" was first published in 1976. Other historical terms for CAPE include potential buoyant energy and net positive buoyant energy.

If buoyancy was the only force acting on a rising air parcel and all CAPE was converted into kinetic energy, the parcel would reach a theoretical maximum vertical velocity $w_\text{max}$ at the equilibrium level:

$$w_\mathrm{max} = \sqrt{2\;\mathrm{CAPE}}$$

The vertical speeds observed in the updrafts do not typically reach this theoretical speed. In reality, there are several factors ignored in the calculation of CAPE and additional forces acting on air parcels that produce meaningful differences in their ultimate vertical velocities. Parcels generally become diluted with air from the surrounding environment as they ascend. This lowers the equivalent potential temperature of the parcel and reduces the amount of CAPE that can be converted to kinetic energy. Additionally, the condensation of water vapor within parcels produces drag which can partly counteract buoyancy, particularly in lower levels of the troposphere where most condensation occurs and in tropical environments. The added heat released by the freezing of water can also contribute to errors in the thermodynamically estimated vertical speed within updrafts.

=== Significance to thunderstorms ===
CAPE can be used in part to assess the types of storms possible in a given environment.

The presence of CAPE is required for convective instability to be realized in tall cumulus and cumulonimbus clouds. The amount of CAPE over a location fluctuates, especially in the tropics and over continents. Thunderstorms can form in environments with varying amounts of CAPE. A CAPE value above roughly 2500 J/kg is generally large for environments supporting severe weather, while values below roughly 1000 J/kg are generally small in those contexts. Over tropical oceans, CAPE values closer to 500 J/kg are typical as parcels may only be 1−2 K warmer than the surrounding air across a 10–12 km (6.2–7.5 mi) depth of the atmosphere. While observed velocities within thunderstorm updrafts do not generally reach the magnitudes predicted by CAPE alone, these contrasts in convective instability result in mid-latitude cumulonimbus clouds harboring faster updraft speeds (up to about 50 m/s [110 mph]) than most tropical oceanic cumulonimbus (closer to 5–10 m/s [10–20 mph]). However, the largest CAPE values in the world are found adjacent to landmasses in the tropics, including over the Red Sea and Persian Gulf bordering the Arabian Peninsula, within the Bay of Bengal off India, and along the northern coast of Australia. In these areas, the 95th percentile of CAPE annually as analyzed between 1979 and 2019 was over 5000 J/kg. The highest CAPE values over land are found over the Congo Basin with a 95th percentile value around 3000 J/kg.

CAPE can provide an indicator for the potential intensity of atmospheric convection, which fuels thunderstorms, though the presence of strong vertical wind shear amplifies other non-buoyant forces which can make CAPE a poor gauge of convective strength. The combination of CAPE and wind shear can yield a rough approximation of the behavior and organization of storms for a given environment. Larger values of CAPE imply the potential for stronger updrafts and stronger storms. However, the presence of high CAPE alone does not guarantee their development as atmospheric layers with high convective stability such as capping inversions can prevent air from tapping into CAPE entirely. This can result in a complete lack of thunderstorms in environments with large values of CAPE.

The type and severity of storms is influenced in part by CAPE, though there is considerable overlap as various storm types and associated severity are supported across a wide spectrum of convective instability. Pulse storms tend to form in environments with moderate amounts of CAPE and weak wind shear. In a relatively narrow range of conditions where the force of buoyancy and horizontal winds are comparable, the environment may support the development of storms into supercells. The bulk Richardson number quantifies this relationship and is proportional to CAPE divided by the ambient horizontal wind speed. High values of CAPE are not required for supercell development; relatively low values of CAPE (<1000 J/kg) concentrated lower in the troposphere can also support supercells. In most circumstances, MLCAPE values of 500–1000 J/kg are required for supercell development. In mesoscale convective systems, the strength of the rear-inflow jet is proportional to CAPE. Bow echoes producing strong winds and featuring book-end vortices are also better supported in high-CAPE environments.

The amount, and shape, of the positive-buoyancy area modulates the speed of updrafts, thus extreme CAPE can result in explosive thunderstorm development; such rapid development usually occurs when CAPE stored by a capping inversion is released when the "lid" is broken by heating or mechanical lift. The amount of CAPE also modulates how low-level vorticity is entrained and then stretched in the updraft, with importance to tornadogenesis. The most important CAPE for tornadoes is within the lowest 1 to 3 km (0.62 to 1.86 mi) of the atmosphere, whilst deep layer CAPE and the width of CAPE at mid-levels is important for supercells. Tornado outbreaks tend to occur within high CAPE environments. Large CAPE is required for the production of very large hail, owing to updraft strength, although a rotating updraft may be stronger with less CAPE. Large CAPE also promotes lightning activity.

Two notable days for severe weather exhibited CAPE values over 5 kJ/kg. Two hours before the 1999 Oklahoma tornado outbreak occurred on May 3, 1999, the CAPE value sounding at Oklahoma City was at 5.89 kJ/kg. A few hours later, an F5 tornado ripped through the southern suburbs of the city. Also on May 4, 2007, CAPE values of 5.5 kJ/kg were reached and an EF5 tornado tore through Greensburg, Kansas. On these days, it was apparent that conditions were ripe for tornadoes and CAPE wasn't a crucial factor. However, extreme CAPE, by modulating the updraft (and downdraft), can allow for exceptional events, such as the deadly F5 tornadoes that hit Plainfield, Illinois on August 28, 1990, and Jarrell, Texas on May 27, 1997, on days which weren't readily apparent as conducive to large tornadoes. CAPE was estimated to exceed 8 kJ/kg in the environment of the Plainfield storm and was around 7 kJ/kg for the Jarrell storm.

Severe weather and tornadoes can develop in an area of low CAPE values. The surprise severe weather event that occurred in Illinois and Indiana on April 20, 2004, is a good example. Importantly in that case, was that although overall CAPE was weak, there was strong CAPE in the lowest levels of the troposphere which enabled an outbreak of minisupercells producing large, long-track, intense tornadoes.

== See also ==
- Atmospheric thermodynamics
- Lifted index
- Maximum potential intensity
