= LEWP =

LEWP may refer to:

- Leading Edge Word Processor, a word processing program distributed with Leading Edge computers in the 1980s.
- Line echo wave pattern, a weather radar formation
- Lower Esopus Watershed Partnership, a New York conservation coalition
