= Mesovortex =

Small-scale rotational weather feature

A mesovortex is a small-scale rotational feature found in a convective storm, such as a quasi-linear convective system (QLCS), a supercell, or the eyewall of a tropical cyclone. Mesovortices range in diameter from tens of miles to a mile or less and can be immensely intense.

== Eyewall mesovortex ==
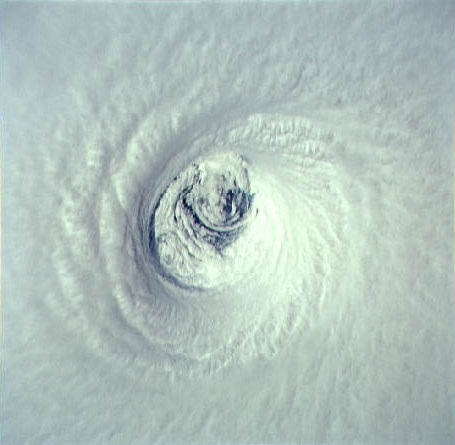
Mesovortices visible in the eye of Hurricane Emilia in 1994.

An eyewall mesovortex is a small-scale rotational feature found in an eyewall of an intense tropical cyclone. Eyewall mesovortices are similar, in principle, to small "suction vortices" often observed in multiple-vortex tornadoes. In these vortices, wind speed can be up to 10% higher than in the rest of the eyewall. Eyewall mesovortices are most common during periods of intensification in tropical cyclones.

Eyewall mesovortices often exhibit unusual behavior in tropical cyclones. They usually revolve around the low pressure center, but sometimes they remain stationary. Eyewall mesovortices have even been documented to cross the eye of a storm. These phenomena have been documented observationally, experimentally, and theoretically.

Eyewall mesovortices are a significant factor in the formation of tornadoes after tropical cyclone landfall. Mesovortices can spawn rotation in individual thunderstorms (a mesocyclone), which leads to tornadic activity. At landfall, friction is generated between the circulation of the tropical cyclone and land. This can allow the mesovortices to descend to the surface, causing large outbreaks of tornadoes.

On 15 September 1989, during observations for Hurricane Hugo, Hunter NOAA42 accidentally flew through an eyewall mesovortex measuring 320 km/h (200 mph) and experienced crippling G-forces of +5.8Gs and -3.7Gs. The winds ripped off the propeller de-icing boot and pushed the flight down to a perilous 1,000 ft (300 m) above sea level. The ruggedized Lockheed WP-3D Orion was only designed for a maximum of +3.5Gs and −1G.

== Mesocyclone ==
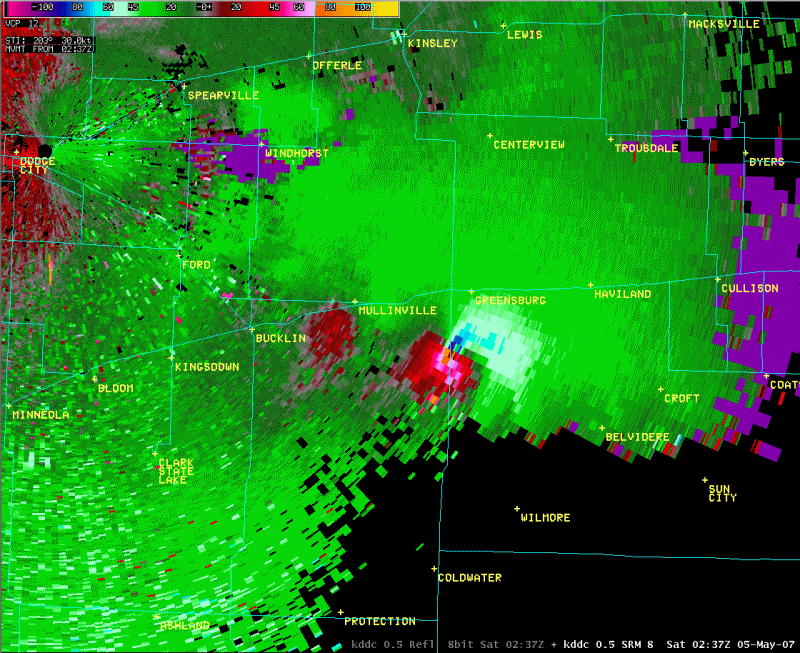
A mesocyclone from the 2007 Greensburg tornado indicated on Doppler weather radar.

A mesocyclone is a type of mesovortex, approximately 1 to 10 km (0.6 to 6 mi) in diameter (the mesoscale of meteorology), within a convective storm. Mesocyclones are air that rises and rotates around a vertical axis, usually in the same direction as low pressure systems in a given hemisphere. They are most often associated with a localized low-pressure region within a severe thunderstorm. Mesocyclones are believed to form when strong changes of wind speed and/or direction with height ("wind shear") sets parts of the lower part of the atmosphere spinning in invisible tube-like rolls. The convective updraft of a thunderstorm is then thought to draw up this spinning air, tilting the air's axis of rotation upward (from parallel to the ground to perpendicular) and causing the entire updraft to rotate as a vertical column. Mesocyclones are normally relatively localized: they lie between the synoptic scale (hundreds of kilometers) and small scale (hundreds of meters). Radar imagery is used to identify these features.

== Mesoscale convective vortex ==
Radar loop from KDVN on the afternoon of June 16, 2024, depicting a strong mesoscale convective vortex with a clear eye.

A mesoscale convective vortex (MCV) is a low-pressure center (mesolow) within a mesoscale convective system (MCS) that pulls winds into a circling pattern, or vortex. With a core only 30 to 60 mi (48 to 97 km) wide and 1 to 3 mi (1.6 to 4.8 km) deep, an MCV is often overlooked in standard surface observations. They have most often been detected on radar and satellite, particularly with the higher resolution and sensitivity of WSR-88D, but with the advent of mesonets, these mesoscale features can also be detected in surface analysis.

An MCV can persist for more than 12 hours after its parent MCS has dissipated. This orphaned MCV will sometimes then become the seed of the next thunderstorm outbreak. Their remnants will often lead to an "agitated area" of increased cumulus activity that can eventually become an area of thunderstorm formation. Associated low-level boundaries left behind can themselves cause convergence and vorticity that can increase the level of organization and intensity of any storms that do form.

An MCV that moves into tropical waters, such as the Gulf of Mexico, can serve as the nucleus for a tropical cyclone (as in the case of Hurricane Barry in 2019, for instance). MCVs, like mesovortices, often cause an intensification of convective downburst winds and can lead to tornadogenesis. One form of MCV is the "comma head" of a line echo wave pattern (LEWP).

=== Example of May 2009 Mid-Mississippi Valley MCV ===
On Friday, May 8, 2009, a major MCV controversially dubbed an "inland hurricane" by local media moved through southern Missouri, southern Illinois, western Kentucky, and southwestern Indiana, killing at least six and injuring dozens more. Damage estimates were in the hundreds of millions. Top speeds of 106 mph (171 km/h) were reported in Carbondale, Illinois.

== See also ==
- Convective storm detection
- Wake low
- Derecho
- Mesoscale convective complex (MCC)
- Rear-inflow jet (RIJ)
- Bow echo
