= Downburst =

Strong surface-level winds that radiate from a single point

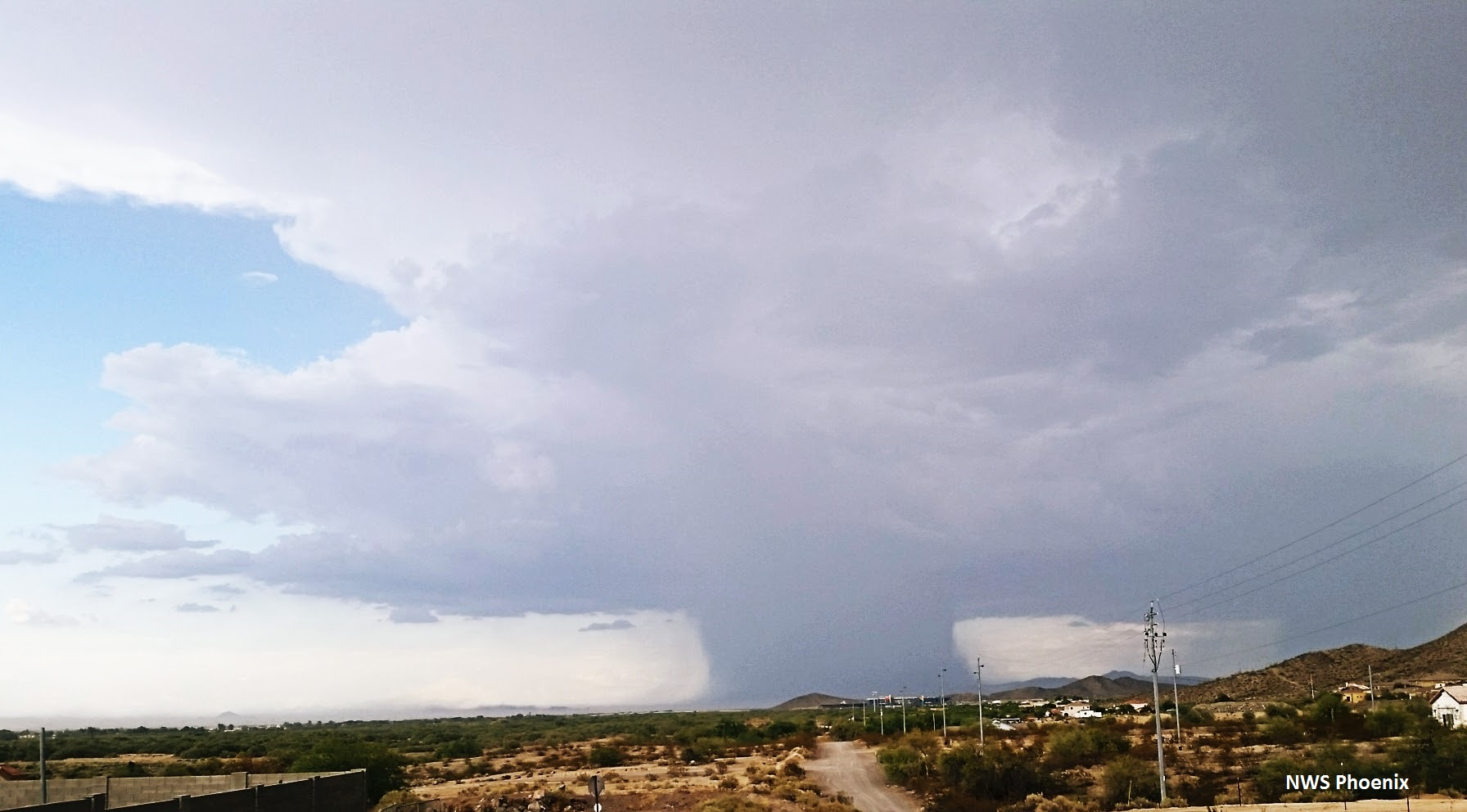
A downburst seen in Phoenix, Arizona.

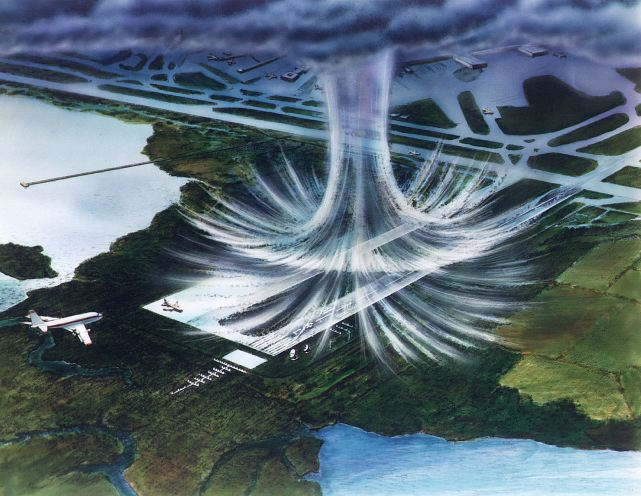
Illustration of a microburst at an airport. The air moves in a downward motion until it hits the surface. It then spreads outward in all directions. The wind regime in a microburst is opposite to that of a tornado.

In meteorology, a downburst is a strong downward and outward gushing wind system that emanates from a point source above and blows radially, that is, in straight lines in all directions from the area of impact at surface level. It originates under deep, moist convective conditions like cumulus congestus or cumulonimbus. Capable of producing damaging winds, it may sometimes be confused with a tornado, where high-velocity winds circle a central area, and air moves inward and upward. Downbursts may be seconds to minutes long.

Dry downbursts are associated with thunderstorms that exhibit very little rain, while wet downbursts are created by thunderstorms with significant amounts of precipitation. Microbursts and macrobursts are downbursts at very small and larger scales, respectively. A rare variety of dry downburst, the heat burst, is created by vertical currents on the backside of old outflow boundaries and squall lines where rainfall is lacking. Heat bursts generate significantly higher temperatures due to the lack of rain-cooled air in their formation and compressional heating during descent.

Downbursts are a topic of notable discussion in aviation, since they create vertical wind shear, which has the potential to be dangerous to aviation, especially during landing (or takeoff), where airspeed performance windows are the most narrow. Several fatal and historic crashes in past decades are attributed to the phenomenon and flight crew training goes to great lengths on how to properly recognize and recover from a downburst/wind shear event; wind shear recovery, among other adverse weather events, are standard topics across the world in flight simulator training that flight crews receive and must successfully complete. Detection and nowcasting technology was also implemented in much of the world and particularly around major airports, which in many cases actually have wind shear detection equipment on the field. This detection equipment helps air traffic controllers and pilots make decisions on the safety and feasibility of operating on or in the vicinity of the airport during storms.

== Definition ==
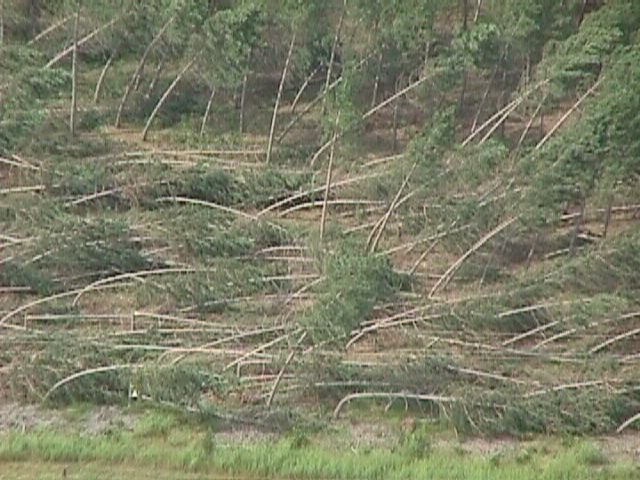
Downburst damage in a straight line.

A downburst is created by a column of sinking air that after hitting the surface spreads out in all directions and is capable of producing straight-line winds of over 240 km/h (150 mph), often producing damage similar to, but distinguishable from, that caused by tornadoes. Downburst damage radiates from a central point as the descending column spreads out when hitting the surface, whereas tornado damage tends towards convergent damage consistent with rotating winds. To differentiate between tornado damage and damage from a downburst, the term straight-line winds is applied to damage from microbursts.

Downbursts in air that is precipitation free or contains virga are known as dry downbursts; those accompanied with precipitation are known as wet downbursts. These generally are formed by precipitation-cooled air rushing to the surface, but they perhaps also could be powered by strong winds aloft being deflected toward the surface by dynamical processes in a thunderstorm (see rear flank downdraft). Most downbursts are less than 4 km (2.5 mi) in extent: these are called microbursts. Downbursts larger than 4 km (2.5 mi) in extent are sometimes called macrobursts. Downbursts can occur over large areas. In the extreme case, a series of continuing downbursts results in a derecho, which covers huge areas of more than 320 km (200 mi) wide and over 1,600 km (1,000 mi) long, persisting for 12 hours or more, and which is associated with some of the most intense straight-line winds.

The term microburst was defined by mesoscale meteorology expert Ted Fujita as affecting an area 4 km (2.5 mi) in diameter or less, distinguishing them as a type of downburst and apart from common wind shear which can encompass greater areas. Fujita also coined the term macroburst for downbursts larger than 4 km (2.5 mi).

=== Dry downbursts ===
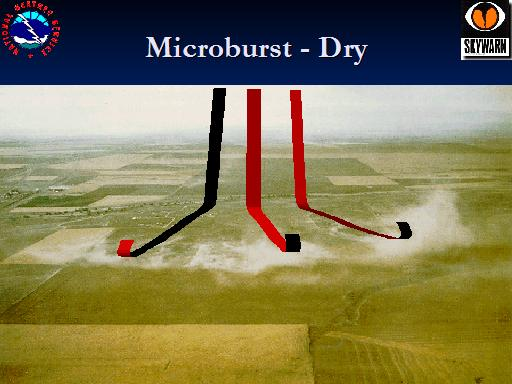
Dry microburst schematic

When rain falls below the cloud base or is mixed with dry air, it begins to evaporate and this evaporation process cools the air. The denser cool air descends and accelerates as it approaches the surface. When the cool air approaches the surface, it spreads out in all directions. High winds spread out in this type of pattern showing little or no curvature are known as straight-line winds.

Dry downbursts are typically produced by high based thunderstorms that contain little to no surface rainfall. They occur in environments characterized by a thermodynamic profile exhibiting an inverted-V at thermal and moisture profile, as viewed on a Skew-T log-P thermodynamic diagram. Wakimoto (1985) developed a conceptual model (over the High Plains of the United States) of a dry downburst environment that comprised three important variables: mid-level moisture, cloud base in the mid troposphere, and low surface relative humidity. These conditions evaporate the moisture from the air as it falls, cooling the air and making it fall faster because it is more dense.

=== Wet downbursts ===
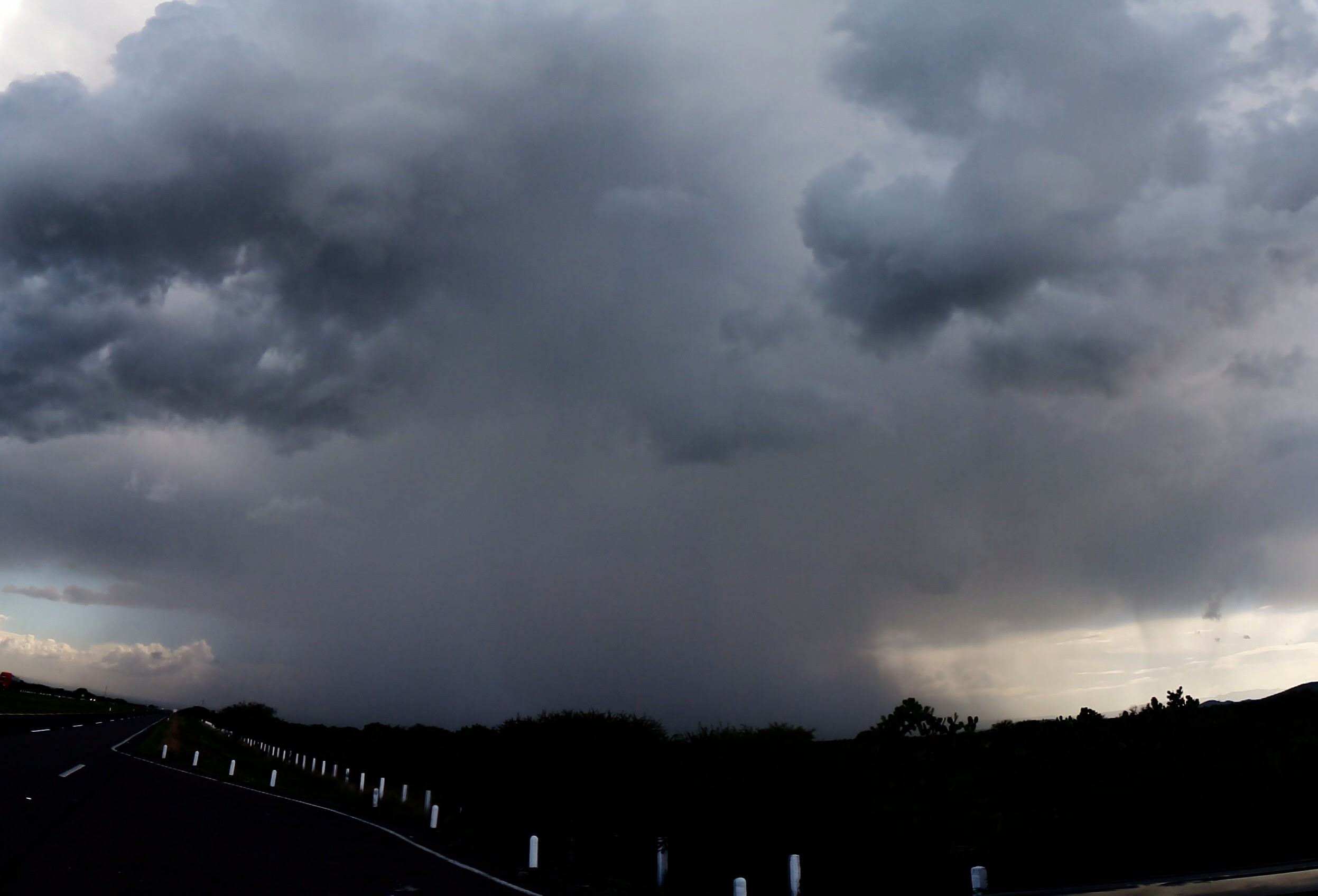
A wet microburst

Wet downburst in Piracicaba, Brazil, on September 22, 2025.

Wet downbursts are accompanied by significant precipitation at the surface. These downbursts rely more on the drag of precipitation for downward acceleration of parcels as well as the negative buoyancy which tend to drive "dry" downbursts. As a result, higher mixing ratios are necessary for these downbursts to form (hence the name "wet" microbursts). Melting of ice, particularly hail, appears to play an important role in downburst formation (Wakimoto and Bringi, 1988), especially in the lowest 1 km (0.6 mi) above surface level. These factors, among others, make forecasting wet microbursts difficult.

| Characteristic | Dry Downburst | Wet Downburst |
|---|---|---|
| Location of highest probability within the United States | Midwestern United States / Western United States | Southeastern United States |
| Precipitation | Little or none | Moderate or heavy |
| Cloud bases | As high as 500 hPa (mb) | As high as 850 hPa (mb) |
| Features below cloud base | Virga | Precipitation shaft |
| Primary catalyst | Evaporative cooling | Precipitation loading and evaporative cooling |
| Environment below cloud base | Deep dry layer/low relative humidity/dry adiabatic lapse rate | Shallow dry layer/high relative humidity/moist adiabatic lapse rate |

=== Straight-line winds ===
Straight-line winds (also known as plough winds, thundergusts, and hurricanes of the prairie) are very strong winds that can produce damage, demonstrating a lack of the rotational damage pattern associated with tornadoes. Straight-line winds are common with the gust front of a thunderstorm or originate with a downburst from a thunderstorm. These events can cause considerable damage, even in the absence of a tornado. The winds can gust to 58 m/s (130 mph) and winds of 26 m/s (58 mph) or more can last for more than twenty minutes. In the United States, such straight-line wind events are most common during the spring when instability is highest and weather fronts routinely cross the country. Straight-line wind events in the form of derechos can take place throughout the eastern half of the U.S.

Straight-line winds may be damaging to marine interests. Small ships, cutters and sailboats are at risk from this meteorological phenomenon.

== Formation ==
The formation of a downburst starts with hail or large raindrops falling through drier air. Hailstones melt and raindrops evaporate, pulling latent heat from surrounding air and cooling it considerably. This cooling increases air density, producing negatively buoyant air that accelerates downward and contributes to the formation of a downburst. As the cold air hits the ground or water it spreads out and a mesoscale front can be observed as a gust front. Areas under and immediately adjacent to the downburst receive the highest winds and rainfall, if any is present. Also, because the rain-cooled air is descending from the middle troposphere, a significant drop in temperatures is noticed. Due to interaction with the surface, the downburst quickly loses strength as it fans out and forms the distinctive "curl shape" that is commonly seen at the periphery of the microburst (see image). Downbursts usually last only a few minutes and then dissipate, except in the case of squall lines and derecho events. However, despite their short lifespan, microbursts are a serious hazard to aviation and property and can result in substantial damage to the area.

Downbursts go through three stages in their cycle: the downburst, outburst, and cushion stages.

== Development stages of downbursts ==
The evolution of downbursts is broken down into three stages: the contact stage, the outburst stage, and the cushion stage:

- A downburst initially develops as the downdraft begins its descent from the cloud base. The downdraft accelerates, and within minutes reaches the surface (contact stage).
- During the outburst stage, the wind "curls" as the cold air of the downburst moves away from the point of impact with the surface.
- During the cushion stage, winds about the curl continue to accelerate, while the winds at the surface slow due to friction.

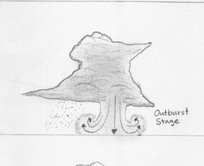

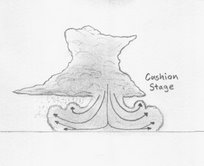

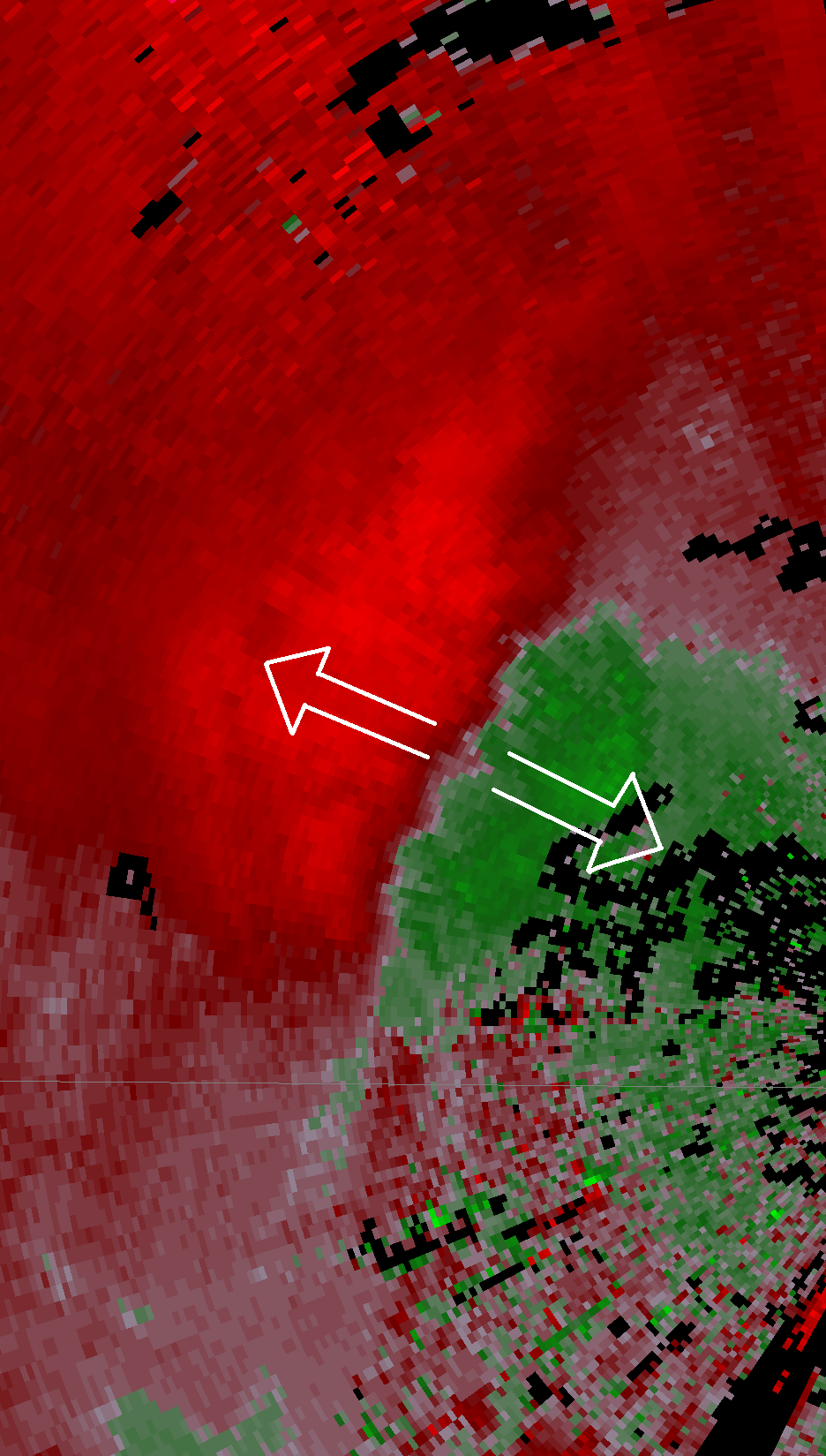
Downburst on a weather radar

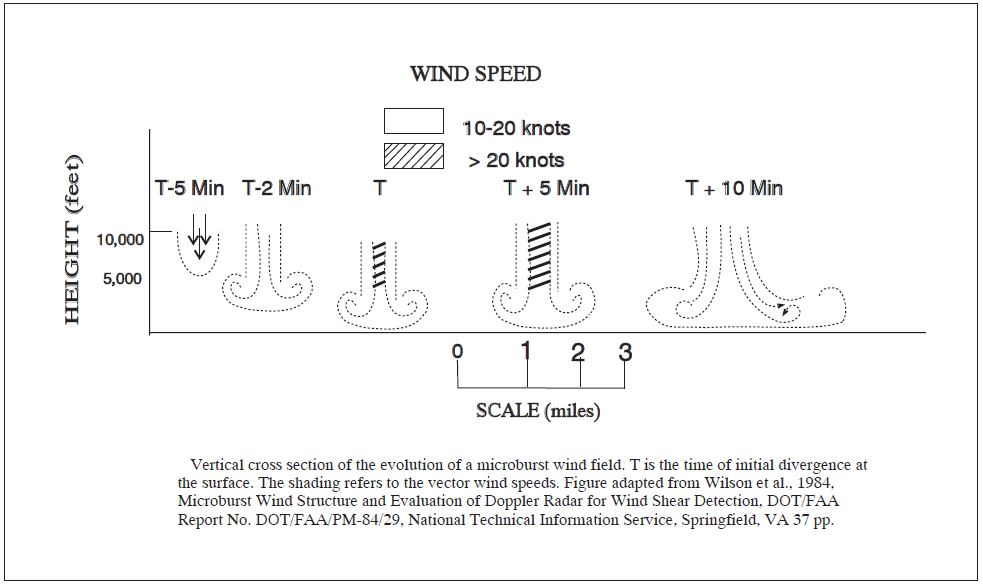
Microbursts' vertical cross-section by time

On a weather radar Doppler display, a downburst is seen as a couplet of radial winds in the outburst and cushion stages. The rightmost image shows such a display from the ARMOR Doppler Weather Radar in Huntsville, Alabama, in 2012. The radar is on the right side of the image and the downburst is along the line separating the velocity towards the radar (green), and the one moving away (red).

== Physical processes of dry and wet downbursts ==

=== Basic physical processes using simplified buoyancy equations ===
Start by using the vertical momentum equation:

${dw\over dt} = -{1\over\rho} {\partial p\over\partial z}-g$

By decomposing the variables into a basic state and a perturbation, defining the basic states, and using the ideal gas law ($p = \rho RT_v$), then the equation can be written in the form

$B \equiv -{\rho^\prime\over\bar\rho}g = g{T^\prime_v - \bar T_v \over \bar T_v}$

where B is buoyancy. The virtual temperature correction usually is rather small and to a good approximation; it can be ignored when computing buoyancy. Finally, the effects of precipitation loading on the vertical motion are parametrized by including a term that decreases buoyancy as the liquid water mixing ratio ($\ell$) increases, leading to the final form of the parcel's momentum equation:

${dw^\prime\over dt} = {1\over\bar\rho}{\partial p^\prime\over\partial z} + B - g\ell$

The first term is the effect of perturbation pressure gradients on vertical motion. In some storms this term has a large effect on updrafts (Rotunno and Klemp, 1982) but there is not much reason to believe it has much of an impact on downdrafts (at least to a first approximation) and therefore will be ignored.

The second term is the effect of buoyancy on vertical motion. Clearly, in the case of downbursts, one expects to find that B is negative, meaning the parcel is cooler than its environment. This cooling typically takes place as a result of phase changes (evaporation, melting, and sublimation). Precipitation particles that are small, but are in great quantity, promote a maximum contribution to cooling and, hence, to creation of negative buoyancy. The major contribution to this process is from evaporation.

The last term is the effect of water loading. Whereas evaporation is promoted by large numbers of small droplets, it only requires a few large drops to contribute substantially to the downward acceleration of air parcels. This term is associated with storms having high precipitation rates. Comparing the effects of water loading to those associated with buoyancy, if a parcel has a liquid water mixing ratio of 1.0 g kg^{−1}, this is roughly equivalent to about 0.3 K of negative buoyancy; the latter is a large (but not extreme) value. Therefore, in general terms, negative buoyancy is typically the major contributor to downdrafts.

=== Negative vertical motion associated only with buoyancy ===
Using pure "parcel theory" results in a prediction of the maximum downdraft of

$-w_{\rm max} = \sqrt{2\times\hbox{NAPE}}$

where NAPE is the negative available potential energy,

$\hbox{NAPE} = -\int_{\rm SFC}^{\rm LFS} B\,dz$

and where LFS denotes the level of free sink for a descending parcel and SFC denotes the surface. This means that the maximum downward motion is associated with the integrated negative buoyancy. Even a relatively modest negative buoyancy can result in a substantial downdraft if it is maintained over a relatively large depth. A downward speed of 25 m/s (56 mph; 90 km/h) results from the relatively modest NAPE value of 312.5 m^{2} s^{−2}. To a first approximation, the maximum gust is roughly equal to the maximum downdraft speed.

== Heat bursts ==
A special, and much rarer, kind of downburst is a heat burst, which results from precipitation-evaporated air compressionally heating as it descends from very high altitude, usually on the backside of a dying squall line or outflow boundary. Heat bursts are chiefly a nocturnal occurrence, can produce winds over 160 km/h (100 mph), are characterized by exceptionally dry air, can suddenly raise the surface temperature to 38 °C (100 °F) or more, and sometimes persist for several hours.

== Danger to shipping ==
The sinking of the yacht Bayesian in August 2024 was attributed, in part, to a downburst, after previously being attributed to a tornado.

== Danger to aviation ==
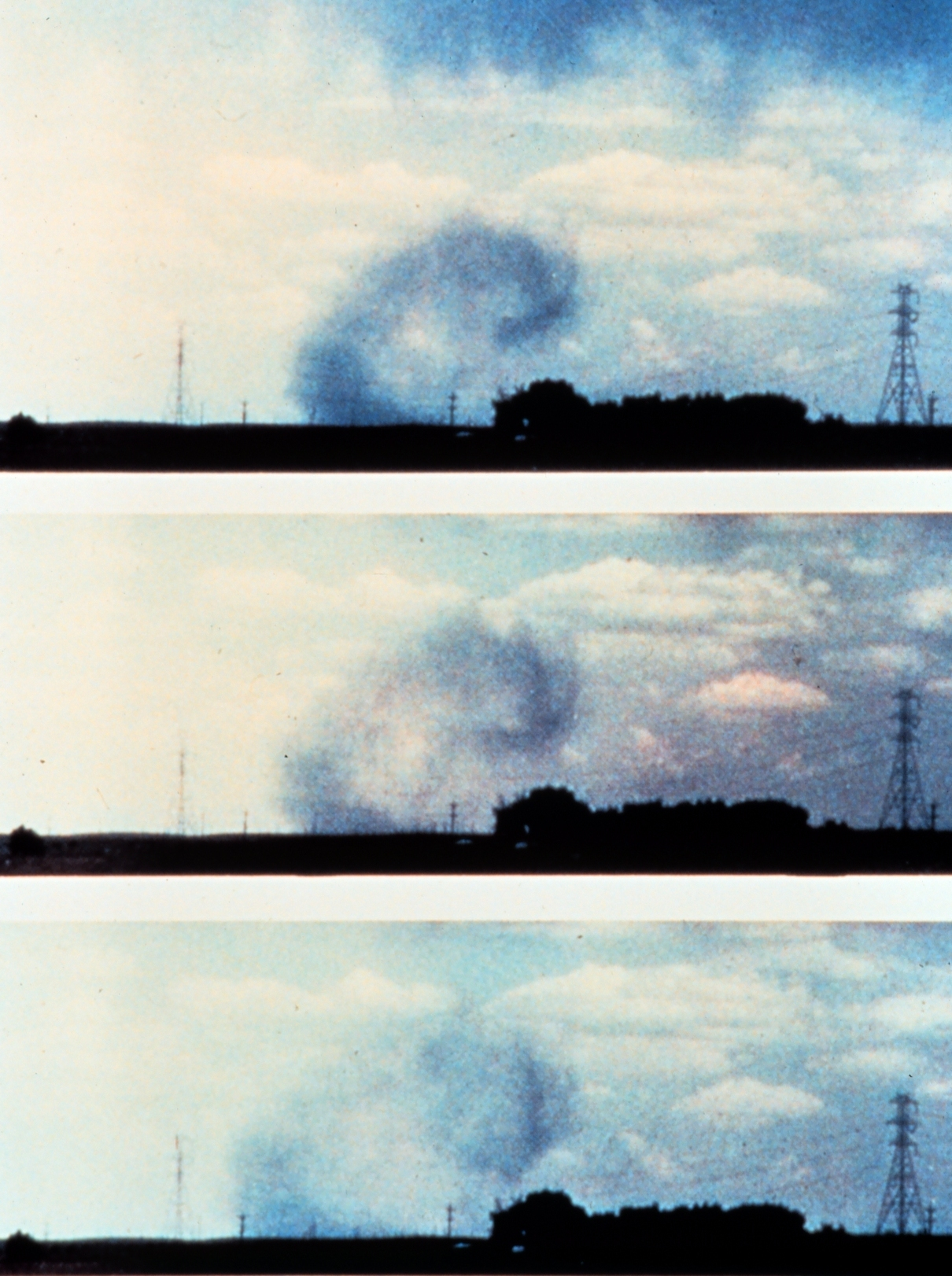
A series of photographs of the surface curl soon after a microburst impacted the surface

Downbursts, particularly microbursts, are exceedingly dangerous to aircraft which are taking off or landing due to the strong vertical wind shear caused by these events. Several fatal crashes are attributed to downbursts.

The following are some fatal crashes and/or aircraft incidents that have been attributed to microbursts in the vicinity of airports:

- 1950 Air France multiple Douglas DC-4 accidents, Douglas DC-4 (F-BBDE and F-BBDM), Bahrain International Airport – 12 and 14 June 1950
- 1956 Kano Airport BOAC Argonaut crash, Canadair C-4 Argonaut (G-ALHE), Kano Airport – 24 June 1956
- Malév Flight 731, Ilyushin Il-18 (HA-MOC), Copenhagen Airport – 28 August 1971
- Ozark Air Lines Flight 809, Fairchild F-27 (N4215), St. Louis International Airport – 23 July 1973
- Pan Am Flight 806, Boeing 707 (N454PA), Pago Pago International Airport – 30 January 1974
- Eastern Air Lines Flight 66, Boeing 727 (N8845E), John F. Kennedy International Airport – 24 June 1975
- Continental Airlines Flight 426, Boeing 727 (N88777), Stapleton International Airport – 7 August 1975
- Allegheny Airlines Flight 121, Douglas DC-9 (N994VJ), Philadelphia International Airport – 23 June 1976
- Continental Airlines Flight 63, Boeing 727 (N32725), Tucson International Airport – 3 June 1977
- Aeroflot Flight 4225, Tupolev Tu-154 (CCCP-85355), Almaty International Airport – 8 July 1980
- Pan Am Flight 759, Boeing 727 (N4737), New Orleans International Airport – 9 July 1982
- USAir Flight 183, McDonnell Douglas DC-9 (N964VJ), Detroit Metropolitan Airport – 13 June 1984
- United Airlines Flight 663, Boeing 727 (N7647U), Stapleton International Airport – 31 May 1984
- Delta Air Lines Flight 191, Lockheed L-1011 TriStar (N726DA), Dallas/Fort Worth International Airport – 2 August 1985
- Mandala Airlines Flight 660, Vickers Viscount 816 (PK-RVU), Pattimura International Airport – 24 July 1992
- Martinair Flight 495, McDonnell Douglas DC-10 (PH-MBN), Faro Airport – 21 December 1992
- USAir Flight 1016, McDonnell Douglas DC-9 (N954VJ), Charlotte/Douglas International Airport – 2 July 1994
- Wuhan Airlines Flight 343, Xian Y-7 (B-3479), Wuhan Wangjiadun Airport – 22 June 2000
- Iberia Flight 1456, Airbus A320 (EC-HKJ), Bilbao Airport – 7 February 2001
- Goodyear Blimp, GZ-20 (N1A, "Stars and Stripes"), Pompano Beach Airpark – 16 June 2005
- Sosoliso Airlines Flight 1145, McDonnell Douglas DC-9 (5N-BFD), Port Harcourt International Airport – 10 December 2005
- ADC Airlines Flight 053, Boeing 737 (5N-BFK), Nnamdi Azikiwe International Airport – 29 October 2006
- Georgian Airways Flight 834, Bombardier CRJ100 (4L-GAE), Kinshasa Airport – 4 April 2011
- Bhoja Air Flight 213, Boeing 737 (AP-BKC), Islamabad International Airport – 20 April 2012
- Aeroméxico Connect Flight 2431, Embraer 190 (XA-GAL), Durango International Airport – 31 July 2018
- UTair Flight 579, Boeing 737 (VQ-BJI), Sochi International Airport – 1 September 2018

A microburst often causes aircraft to crash when they are attempting to land or shortly after takeoff (American Airlines Flight 63 and Delta Air Lines Flight 318 are notable exceptions). The microburst is an extremely powerful gust of air that, once hitting the surface, spreads in all directions. As the aircraft is coming in to land, the pilots try to slow the plane to an appropriate speed. When the microburst hits, the pilots will see a large spike in their airspeed, caused by the force of the headwind created by the microburst. A pilot inexperienced with microbursts would try to decrease the speed. The plane would then travel through the microburst, and fly into the tailwind, causing a sudden decrease in the amount of air flowing across the wings. The decrease in airflow over the wings of the aircraft causes a drop in the amount of lift produced. This decrease in lift combined with a strong downward flow of air can cause the thrust required to remain at altitude to exceed what is available, thus causing the aircraft to stall. If the plane is at a low altitude shortly after takeoff or during landing, it will not have sufficient altitude to recover.

The strongest microburst recorded thus far occurred at Andrews Field, Maryland, on 1 August 1983, with wind speeds reaching 240.5 km/h (149.4 mph).

== Danger to buildings ==
- On 21 June 2023, a severe thunderstorm in the Greater Houston area resulted in a powerful downburst. The storm was part of a larger tornado outbreak sequence that occurred on 20–26 June 2023. A record-breaking wind gust of 97 mph (156 km/h) was observed at George Bush Intercontinental Airport, surpassing the previous record of 82 mph (132 km/h) recorded during Hurricane Ike in 2008. The aftermath left approximately 324,000 customers without power and caused extensive damage to CenterPoint Energy's equipment and infrastructure. The storm caused significant damage to buildings, with at least 243 homes damaged. The storm was strong enough to flip a small plane and push another off the tarmac at Hooks Airport in northwest Harris County, while at Bush Intercontinental Airport, a Ukrainian Antonov An-12 tipped up on its tail in the heavy winds.
- On 21 May 2022, a particularly intense downburst was responsible for damage in Ottawa, Ontario, Canada. Maximum wind speeds reaching 190 km/h (120 mph) were surveyed and analyzed by the Northern Tornados Project, in an area measuring approximately 36 km (22 mi) long and 5 km (3 mi) wide. 10 people were killed and many communities experienced significant damage and power outages spanning days as a result of the derecho that moved across Ontario and Quebec. It was one of Canada's most destructive wind storms in its history, with over $875 million in damages across both provinces.

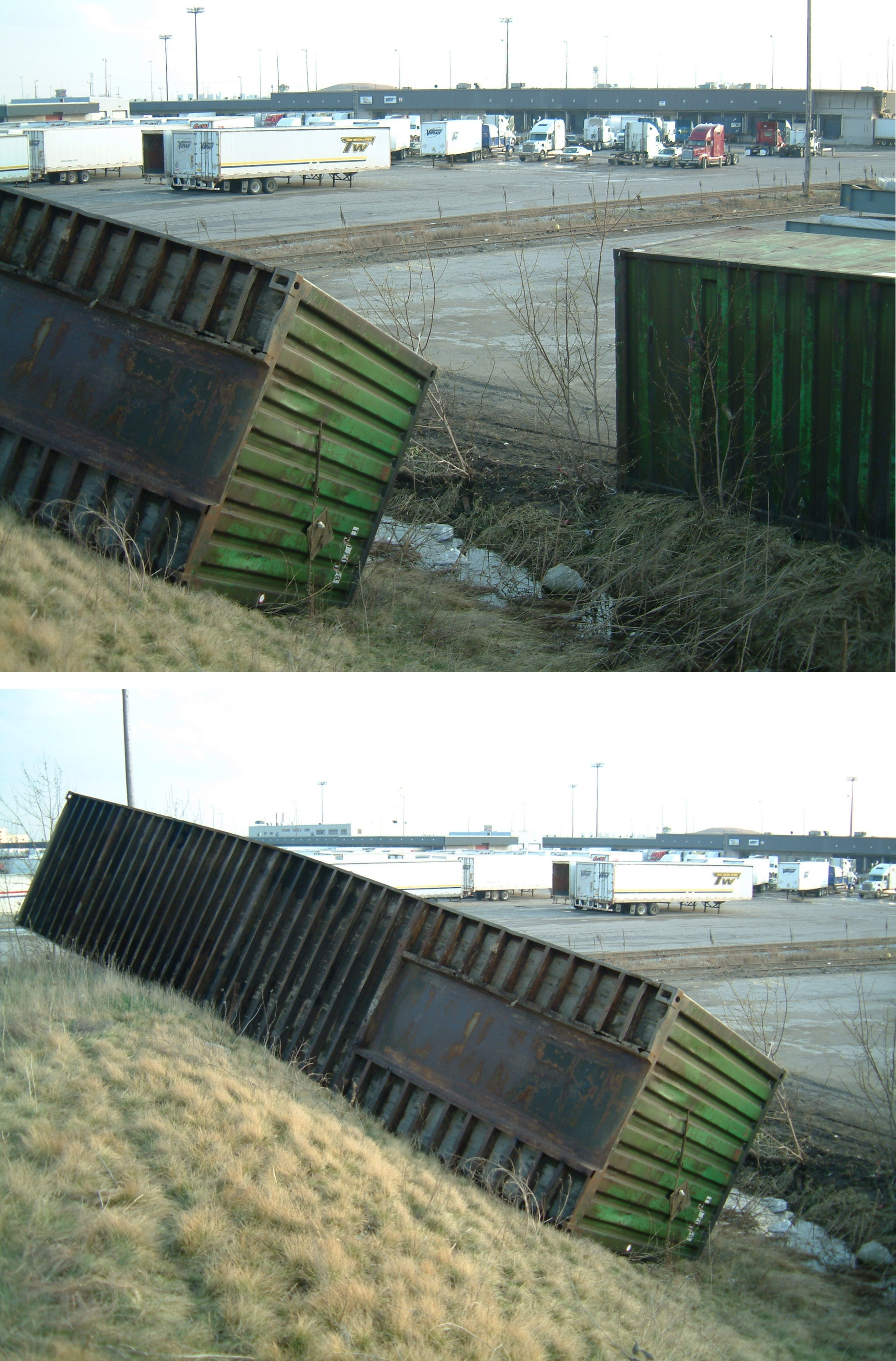
Strong microburst winds flipped a several-ton shipping container up the side of a hill at Vaughan, Ontario, Canada in April 2007.

- On 31 March 2019, a very destructive downburst cluster with characteristics of a small derecho, but too small to satisfy the criteria, impacted across a 33 km (21 mi) wide and 45 km (28 mi) long swath in the Bara and Parsa Districts, Nepal. Occurring at an elevation of 83 to 109 m (270 to 360 ft) amsl around 18:45 local time, the 30-45 min duration winds flattened many and severely damaged numerous buildings, leading to 28 deaths and hundreds of injuries.
- On 11 July, 2018, microburst played a role on a Phoenix, Arizona, supermarket fire.
- On 15 May 2018, an extremely powerful front moved through the northeastern United States, specifically New York and Connecticut, causing significant damage. Nearly a half million people lost power and 5 people were killed. Winds were recorded in excess of 100 mph (160 km/h) and several tornadoes and macrobursts were confirmed by the NWS.
- On 3 April 2018, a wet microburst struck William P. Hobby Airport, Texas at 11:53 p.m., causing an aircraft hangar to partially collapse. Six business jets (four stored in the hangar and two outside) were damaged. A severe thunderstorm warning was issued just seconds before the microburst struck.
- On 23 May 2017, a wet microburst struck Sealy, Texas, with 80 to 100 mph (130 to 160 km/h) winds knocking down trees and power lines. Significant damage to structures was reported across Sealy. Twenty students were slightly injured by flying debris while attending a function at Sealy High School.
- On 9 August 2016, a wet microburst struck the city of Cleveland Heights, Ohio, an eastern suburb of Cleveland. The storm developed very quickly. Thunderstorms developed west of Cleveland at 9 p.m., and the National Weather Service issued a severe thunderstorm warning at 9:55 p.m. The storm had passed over Cuyahoga County by 10:20 p.m. Lightning struck 10 times per minute over Cleveland Heights. and 80 mph (130 km/h) winds knocked down hundreds of trees and utility poles. More than 45,000 people lost power, with damage so severe that nearly 6,000 homes remained without power two days later.
- On 22 July 2016, a wet microburst hit portions of Kent and Providence Counties in Rhode Island, causing wind damage in the cities of Cranston, Rhode Island, and West Warwick, Rhode Island. Numerous fallen trees were reported, as well as downed powerlines and minimal property damage. Thousands of people were without power for several days, even as long as over 4 days. The storm occurred late at night, and no injuries were reported.
- On 23 June 2015, a macroburst hit portions of Gloucester and Camden Counties in New Jersey causing widespread damage mostly due to falling trees. Electrical utilities were affected for several days causing protracted traffic signal disruption and closed businesses.
- On 23 August 2014, a dry microburst hit Mesa, Arizona. It ripped the roof off of half a building and a shed, nearly damaging the surrounding buildings. No serious injuries were reported.
- On 21 December 2013, a wet microburst hit Brunswick, Ohio. The roof was ripped off of a local business; the debris damaged several houses and cars near the business. Due to the time, between 1 am and 2 am, there were no injuries.
- On 9 July 2012, a wet microburst hit an area of Spotsylvania County, Virginia, near the border of the city of Fredericksburg, causing severe damage to two buildings. One of the buildings was a children's cheerleading center. Two serious injuries were reported.
- On 22 June 2012, a wet microburst hit the town of Bladensburg, Maryland, causing severe damage to trees, apartment buildings, and local roads. The storm caused an outage in which 40,000 customers lost power.
- On 8 September 2011, at 5:01 p.m., a dry microburst hit Nellis Air Force Base, Nevada causing several aircraft shelters to collapse. Multiple aircraft were damaged and eight people were injured.
- On 18 August 2011, a wet microburst hit the musical festival Pukkelpop in Hasselt, causing severe localized damage. Five people were killed and at least 140 people were injured. Later research showed that the wind reached speeds of 170 km/h (110 mph).
- On 22 September 2010, in the Hegewisch neighborhood of Chicago, a wet microburst hit, causing severe localized damage and localized power outages, including fallen-tree impacts into at least four homes. No fatalities were reported.
- On 16 September 2010, just after 5:30 p.m., a wet macroburst with winds of 125 mph (200 km/h) hit parts of Central Queens in New York City, causing extensive damage to trees, buildings, and vehicles in an area 8 miles long and 5 miles wide. Approximately 3,000 trees were knocked down by some reports. There was one fatality when a tree fell onto a car on the Grand Central Parkway.
- On 24 June 2010, shortly after 4:30 p.m., a wet microburst hit the city of Charlottesville, Virginia. Field reports and damage assessments show that Charlottesville experienced numerous downbursts during the storm, with wind estimates at over 75 mph (120 km/h). In a matter of minutes, trees and downed power lines littered the roadways. A number of houses were hit by trees. Immediately after the storm, up to 60,000 Dominion Power customers in Charlottesville and surrounding Albemarle County were without power.
- On 11 June 2010, around 3:00 a.m., a wet microburst hit a neighborhood in southwestern Sioux Falls, South Dakota. It caused major damage to four homes, all of which were occupied. No injuries were reported. Roofs were blown off of garages and walls were flattened by the estimated 100 mph (160 km/h) winds. The cost of repairs was thought to be $500,000 or more.
- On 2 May 2009, the lightweight steel and mesh building in Irving, Texas, used for practice by the Dallas Cowboys football team was flattened by a microburst, according to the National Weather Service.
- On 12 March 2006, a microburst hit Lawrence, Kansas. 60 percent of the University of Kansas campus buildings sustained some form of damage from the storm. Preliminary estimates put the cost of repairs at between $6 million and $7 million.
- On 13 May 1989, a microburst with winds over 95 mph (150 km/h) hit Fort Hood, Texas. Over 200 U.S. Army helicopters were damaged. The storm damaged at least 20 percent of the fort's buildings, forcing 25 military families from their quarters. In a preliminary damage estimate, the Army said repairs to almost 200 helicopters would cost $585 million and repairs to buildings and other facilities about $15 million.
- On May 9, 1980, a microburst at the leading edge of an advancing cold front struck the 606 ft (185 m) freighter MV Summit Venture just as it was about to pass through the narrow channel under the Sunshine Skyway Bridge over Tampa Bay. Sudden torrential rain cut visibility to zero and straight-line winds estimated at over 70 mph (110 km/h) pushed the ship into a support pier, causing the catastrophic collapse of the southbound span and 35 deaths as several private vehicles and a Greyhound Bus plummeted 150 ft (46 m) into the water.
- On 4 July 1977, the Independence Day Derecho of 1977 formed over west-central Minnesota. As the derecho moved east-southeast, it became very intense over central Minnesota around midday. From that time through the afternoon the system produced winds of 80 to more than 100 mph (160 km/h), with areas of extreme damage from central Minnesota into northern Wisconsin. The derecho continued rapidly southeast before finally weakening over northern Ohio.

== See also ==
- Bow echo
- Haboob
- Line echo wave pattern (LEWP)
- List of derecho events
- List of microbursts
- Low level windshear alert system (LLWAS)
- Mesovortex
- Planetary boundary layer (PBL)
- Rear-inflow jet (RIJ)
- Squall
- Vertical draft
- Windthrow

== Bibliography ==
- Fujita, T. T. (1981). "Tornadoes and Downbursts in the Context of Generalized Planetary Scales". Journal of the Atmospheric Sciences, 38 (8).
- Fujita, T. T. (1985). "The Downburst, microburst and macroburst". SMRP Research Paper 210, 122 pp.
- National Weather Service. "Downbursts". National Weather Service Forecast Office Columbia, SC. 5 May 2010. 4 December 2010. http://www.erh.noaa.gov/cae/svrwx/downburst.htm
- Wilson, James W. and Roger M. Wakimoto (2001). "The Discovery of the Downburst – TT Fujita's Contribution". Bulletin of the American Meteorological Society, 82 (1).
