= Inflow (meteorology) =

Meteorological term for flow of a fluid into a large collection of itself

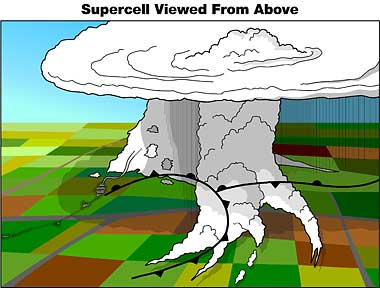
Supercellular thunderstorm image showing cumulus inflow bands

Inflow is the flow of a fluid into a large collection of that fluid. Within meteorology, inflow normally refers to the influx of warmth and moisture from air within the Earth's atmosphere into storm systems. Extratropical cyclones are fed by inflow focused along their cold front and warm fronts. Tropical cyclones require a large inflow of warmth and moisture from warm oceans in order to develop significantly, mainly within the lowest 1 kilometre (0.62 mi) of the atmosphere. Once the flow of warm and moist air is cut off from thunderstorms and their associated tornadoes, normally by the thunderstorm's own rain-cooled outflow boundary, the storms begin to dissipate. Rear inflow jets behind squall lines act to erode the broad rain shield behind the squall line, and accelerate its forward motion.

== Thunderstorms ==
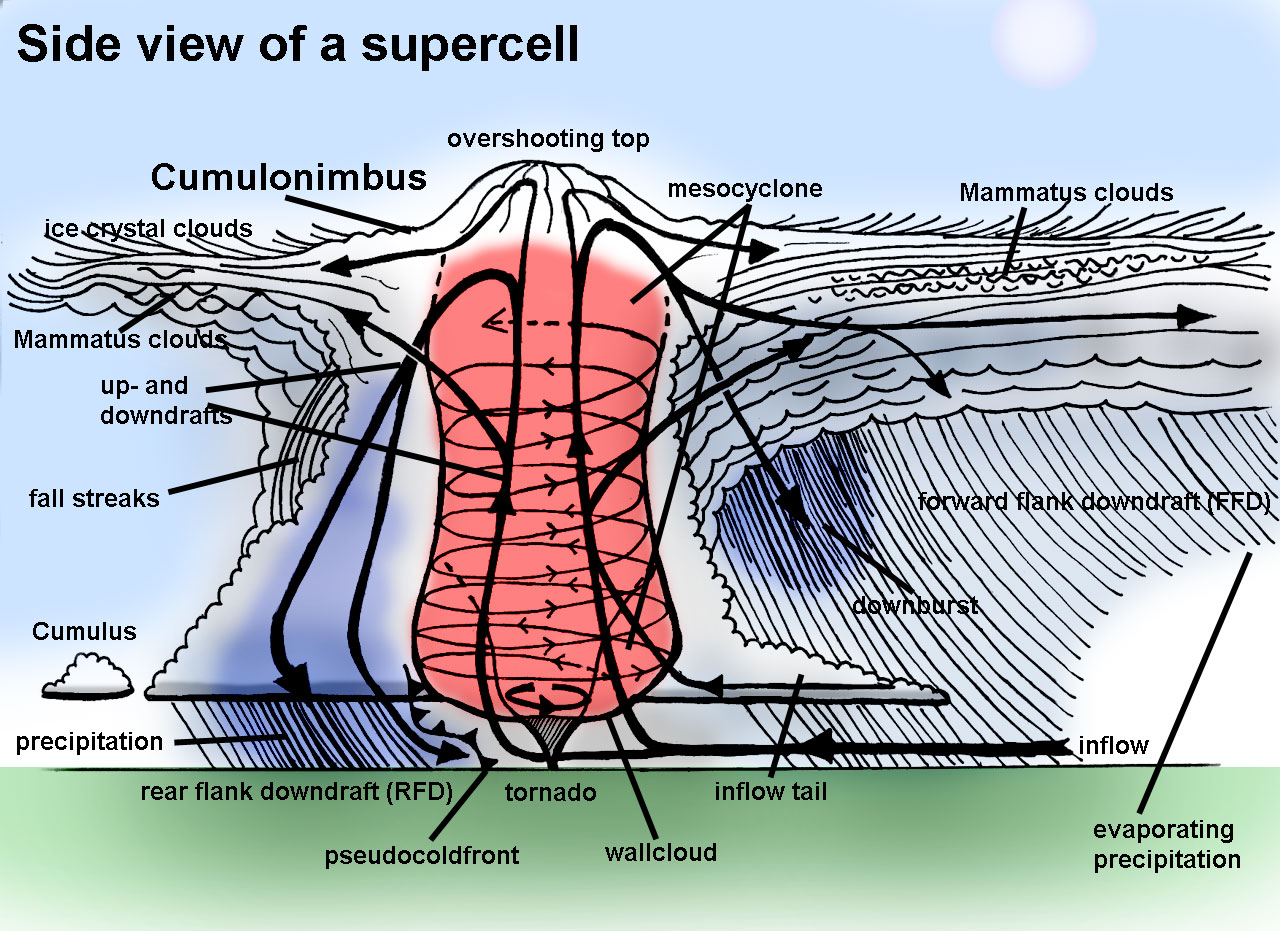
Airflow in and around a supercell with the inflow at the base on right.

The inflow into a thunderstorm, or complex of thunderstorms, is the circulation of warm and humid air ahead of a trigger convergence zone such as a cold front. This airmass is uplifted by the trigger and form convective clouds. Later, cool air carried to the ground by thunderstorm downdraft, cuts off the inflow of the thunderstorm, destroying its updraft and causing its dissipation.

Tornadoes, which form within stronger thunderstorms, grow until they reach their mature stage. This is when the rear flank downdraft of the thunderstorm, fed by rain-cooled air, begins to wrap around the tornado, cutting off the inflow of warm air which previously fed the tornado.

Inflow can originate from mid-levels of the atmosphere too. When thunderstorms are able to organize into squall lines, a feature known as a rear inflow jet develops to the south of the mid-level circulation associated with its northern bookend vortex. This leads to an erosion of rain within the broad rain shield behind the squall line, and may lead to acceleration of the squall line itself.

== Tropical cyclones ==
Structure of a tropical cyclone with inflow in red.

While an initial warm core system, such as an organized thunderstorm complex, is necessary for the formation of a tropical cyclone, a large flux of energy is needed to lower atmospheric pressure more than a few millibars (0.10 inch of mercury). Inflow of warmth and moisture from the underlying ocean surface is critical for tropical cyclone strengthening. A significant amount of the inflow in the cyclone is in the lowest 1 kilometre (3,300 ft) of the atmosphere.

== Extratropical cyclones ==
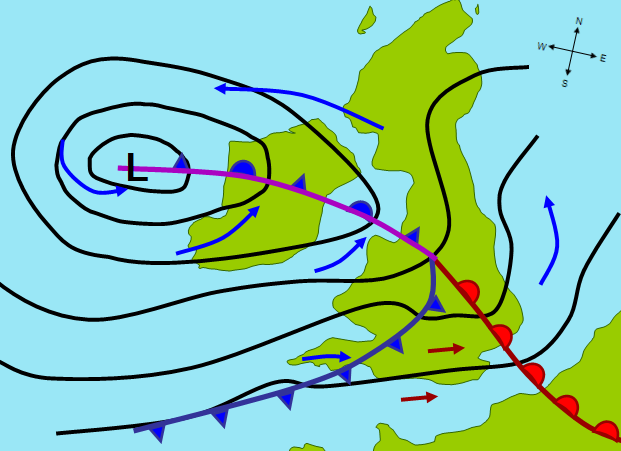
A weather map of an extratropical cyclone affecting Great Britain and Ireland. The "L" symbol denotes the center of the "low", and the occluded, cold, and warm frontal boundaries are depicted.

Polar front theory is attributed to Jacob Bjerknes, and was derived from a coastal network of observation sites in Norway during World War I. This theory proposed that the main inflow into a cyclone was concentrated along two lines of convergence, one ahead (or east) of the low and another trailing equatorward (south in the Northern Hemisphere and north in the Southern Hemisphere) and behind (or west) of the low. The convergence line ahead of the low became known as either the steering line or the warm front. The trailing convergence zone was referred to as the squall line or cold front. Areas of clouds and rainfall appeared to be focused along these convergence zones. A conveyor belt, also referred to as the warm conveyor belt, is a term describing the flow of a stream of warm moist air originating within the warm sector (or generally equatorward) of an extratropical cyclone in advance of the cold front which slopes up above and poleward (north in the Northern Hemisphere and south in the Southern Hemisphere) of the surface warm front. The concept of the conveyor belt originated in 1969.

The left edge of the conveyor belt is sharp due to higher density air moving in from the west forcing a sharp slope to the cold front. An area of stratiform precipitation develops poleward of the warm front along the conveyor belt. Active precipitation poleward of the warm front implies potential for greater development of the cyclone. A portion of this conveyor belt turns to the right (left in the Southern Hemisphere), aligning with the upper level westerly flow. However, the western portion of this belt wraps around the northwest (southwest in the Southern Hemisphere) side of the cyclone, which can contain moderate to heavy precipitation. If the air mass is cold enough, the precipitation falls in the form of heavy snow. Theory from the 1980s talked about the presence of a cold conveyor belt originating north of the warm front and flowing along a clockwise path (in the northern hemisphere) into the main belt of the westerlies aloft, but there has been conflicting evidence as to whether or not this phenomenon actually exists.

== See also ==
- Outflow (meteorology)
