= Derecho =

Widespread, long-lived, straight-line wind storm

Timelapse video of a derecho approaching and eventually passing over an airport in South Dakota, United States

A derecho (/dəˈɹeɪ.t͡ʃoʊ/, from Spanish: derecho [deˈɾetʃo], 'straight') is a widespread, long-lived, straight-line wind storm that is associated with a fast-moving complex of severe thunderstorms referred to as a mesoscale convective system.

Derechos cause hurricane-force winds, heavy rains, and flash floods. In many cases, convection-induced winds take on a bow echo (backward "C") form of squall line, often forming beneath an area of diverging upper tropospheric winds, and in a region of both rich low-level moisture and warm-air advection. Derechos move rapidly in the direction of movement of their associated storms, similar to an outflow boundary (gust front). The difference between derechos and conventional gust fronts is that derecho winds remain sustained for a longer period of time – often increasing in strength after onset – and may reach tornado- and hurricane-force. A derecho-producing convective system may remain active for many hours; occasionally even for several days.

A warm-weather phenomenon, derechos mostly occur in summer, especially during June, July, and August in the Northern Hemisphere, or March, April, and May in the Southern Hemisphere, within areas of moderately strong instability and moderately strong vertical wind shear. However, derechos can occur any time of the year. They are equally likely during day and night.

Studies since the 1980s have researched the physical processes responsible for the production of widespread damaging winds by thunderstorms. The most damaging derechos are associated with particular types of mesoscale convective systems that are self-perpetuating (meaning that the convective systems are not strongly dependent on the larger-scale meteorological processes such as those associated with blizzard-producing winter storms and strong cold fronts). The term "derecho" sometimes is misapplied to convectively generated wind events that are not particularly well-organized or long-lasting. For these reasons, a more precise, physically based definition of "derecho" has been introduced within the meteorological community.

== Etymology ==
Derecho comes from the Spanish adjective for "straight" (or "direct"), in contrast with a tornado which is a "twisted" wind. The word was first used in the 1888 American Meteorological Journal by Gustavus Detlef Hinrichs in a paper describing the phenomenon and based on a significant derecho event that crossed Iowa on 31 July 1877.

== Development ==
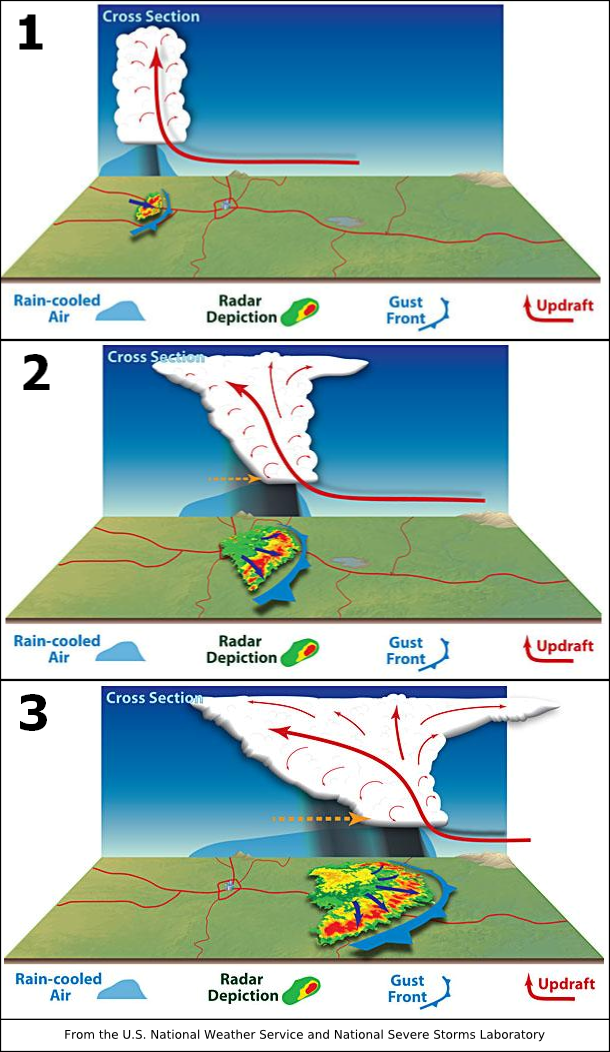
Development of derechos

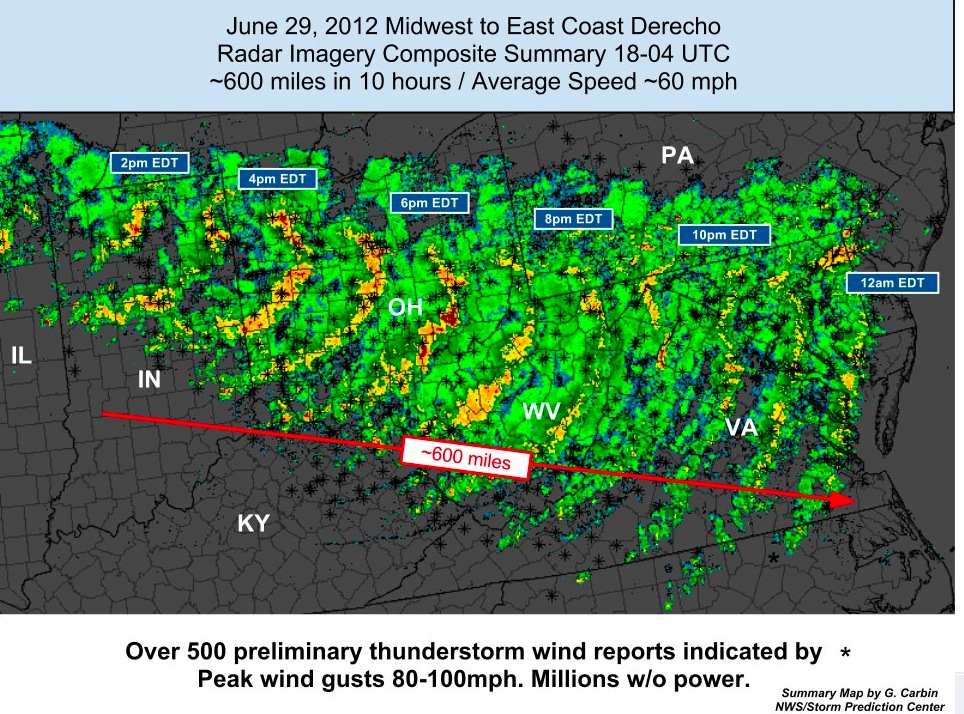
Composite radar image of the June 2012 North American derecho (a progressive derecho) as it moved from Indiana to Virginia

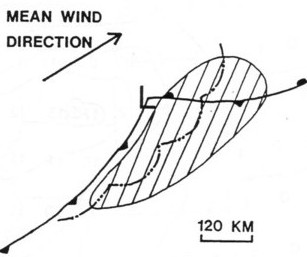
A typical multi-bow serial derecho

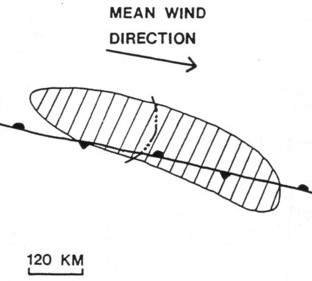
A typical progressive derecho

Organized areas of thunderstorm activity reinforce pre-existing frontal zones, and can outrun cold fronts. The resultant mesoscale convective system (MCS) often forms at the point of the strongest divergence of the upper-level flow, and new storm cells are developed in the area with the greatest low-level inflow. The convection tends to move east or toward the equator, roughly parallel to low-level thickness lines and usually somewhat to the right of the mean tropospheric flow. When the convection is strongly linear or slightly curved, the MCS is called a squall line, with the strongest winds typically occurring just behind the leading edge of the significant wind shift and pressure rise.

Classic derechos occur with squall lines that contain bow- or spearhead-shaped features as seen by weather radar that are known as bow echoes or spearhead echoes. Squall lines typically "bow out" due to the formation of a mesoscale high-pressure system which forms within the stratiform rain area behind the initial convective line. This high-pressure area is formed due to strong descending air currents behind the squall line, and could come in the form of a downburst. The size of the bow may vary, and the storms associated with the bow may die and redevelop.

During the cool season within the Northern Hemisphere, derechos generally develop within a pattern of mid-tropospheric southwesterly winds, in an environment of low to moderate atmospheric instability (caused by relative warmth and moisture near ground level, with cooler air aloft, as measured by convective available potential energy), and high values of vertical wind shear (20 m/s or 40 knots within the lowest 5 km or 16,000 ft of the atmosphere).

Warm season derechos in the Northern Hemisphere most often form in west to northwesterly flow at mid-levels of the troposphere, with moderate to high levels of thermodynamic instability. As previously mentioned, derechos favor environments of low-level warm advection and significant low-level moisture.

In 2025, researchers from the University of Oklahoma, CIWRO, and Storm Prediction Center, published a study regarding the environment for derechos and non-derecho storms, and how the key factor was the bulk wind shear between 1 and 9 kilometres (0.62 and 5.59 mi) in the atmosphere.

== Classification and criteria ==
A common definition is a thunderstorm complex that produces a damaging wind swath of at least 390–640 kilometres (240–400 mi), featuring a concentrated area of convectively-induced wind gusts exceeding 25 m/s (50 kn). According to the National Weather Service (NWS) criterion, a derecho is classified as a band of storms that have winds of at least 25 m/s (50 kn) along the entire span of the storm front, maintained over a time span of at least six hours. Some studies add a requirement that no more than two or three hours separate any two successive wind reports. A more recent, more physically based definition of "derecho" proposes that the term be reserved for use with convective systems that not only contain unique radar-observed features such as bow echoes and mesovortices, but also for events that produce damage swaths at least 100 km (60 miles) wide and 650 km (400 miles) long.

On 11 January 2022, the National Oceanic and Atmospheric Administration (NOAA) and Environment and Climate Change Canada (ECCC) formally revised the criteria for a storm to be classified as a derecho. A wind storm must meet the following criteria:

- Wind damage swath extending for more than 400 miles (640 km)
- Wind gusts of at least 58 miles per hour (26 m/s; 50 kn) along most of its length
- Several, well-separated 75 miles per hour (34 m/s; 65 kn) or greater gusts

Prior to 11 January 2022, the definition for a derecho was:

- Wind damage swath extending for more than 240 mi (390 km)
- Wind gusts of at least 58 mph (93 km/h; 26 m/s; 50 kn) along most of its length

On 10 May 2025, NOAA and ECCC formally revised the criteria for derechos in the United States and Canada to the following:

- Widespread reports of wind gusts of at least 58 miles per hour (26 m/s; 50 kn), all occurring from the same mesoscale convective system (MCS)
- The MCS must be at least 60 miles (97 km) long
- The MCS must last at least 3 hours
- The forward speed of the MCS must be faster than the environmental mean wind speed
- No more than one hour may occur between wind reports
- Spatial gaps between wind reports may not exceed 124 miles (200 km)
- The wind swath must be at least 250 miles (400 km) long
- At least three wind reports of at least 75 miles per hour (121 km/h) must be separated by 80 miles (130 km)

The 2025 revision was done to objectively define derecho events using an algorithm and eliminate ambiguity for the formal application of the term. The new definition was adopted in the United States and Canada based on an article from the Bulletin of the American Meteorological Society specifically for the Central and Eastern United States, the authors of which suggest in the article that such a definition may need to be adjusted for other regions to be consistent with local recordkeeping.

=== Types ===
Four types of derechos are generally recognized:

- Serial derecho – This type of derecho is usually associated with a very deep low.
  - Single-bow – A very large bow echo around or upwards of 400 km (250 miles) long. This type of serial derecho is less common than the multi-bow kind. A few examples of a single-bow serial derecho are the derecho that occurred in association with the October 2010 North American storm complex, and the December 2021 Midwest derecho.
  - Multi-bow – Multiple bow derechos are embedded in a large squall line typically around 400 km (250 miles) long. One example of a multi-bow serial derecho is a derecho that occurred during the 1993 Storm of the Century in Florida. Because of embedded supercells, tornadoes can spin out of these types of derechos. This is a much more common type of serial derecho than the single-bow kind. Multi-bow serial derechos can be associated with line echo wave patterns (LEWPs) on weather radar.
- Progressive derecho – A line of thunderstorms take the bow-shape and may travel for hundreds of miles along stationary fronts. Examples of this include "Hurricane Elvis" in 2003, the August 2020 Midwest derecho, the Boundary Waters-Canadian Derecho of 4–5 July 1999, and the May 2022 Canadian derecho. Tornado formation is less common in a progressive than serial type.
- Hybrid derecho – A derecho with characteristics of both a serial and progressive derecho. Similar to serial derechos and progressive derechos, these types of derechos are associated with a deep low, but are relatively small in size. An example is the Late-May 1998 tornado outbreak and derecho that moved through the central Northern Plains and the Southern Great Lakes on 30–31 May 1998.
- Low dewpoint derecho – A derecho that occurs in an environment of comparatively limited low-level moisture, with appreciable moisture confined to the mid-levels of the atmosphere. Such derechos most often occur between late fall and early spring in association with strong low-pressure systems. Low dew point derechos are essentially organized bands of successive, dry downbursts. The Utah-Wyoming derecho of 31 May 1994 was an event of this type. It produced a 45 m/s (90 kn) wind gust at Provo, Utah, where sixteen people were injured, and removed part of the roof of the Saltair Pavilion on the Great Salt Lake. Surface dew points along the path of the derecho were about 7–11 °C (45–50 °F).

== Characteristics ==
Winds in a derecho can be enhanced by downburst clusters embedded inside the storm. These straight-line winds may exceed 45 m/s (85 kn), reaching 60 m/s (115 kn) in past events. Tornadoes sometimes form within derecho events, although such events are often difficult to confirm due to the additional damage caused by straight-line winds in the immediate area.

With the average tornado in the United States and Canada rating in the low end of the F/EF1 classification at 40 to 45 m/s (75 to 85 kn) peak winds and most or all of the rest of the world even lower, derechos tend to deliver the vast majority of extreme wind conditions over much of the territory in which they occur. Datasets compiled by the United States National Weather Service and other organizations show that a large swath of the north-central United States, and presumably at least the adjacent sections of Canada and much of the surface of the Great Lakes, can expect winds from 40 to 55 m/s (75 to 105 kn) over a significant area at least once in any 50-year period, including both convective events and extra-tropical cyclones and other events deriving power from baroclinic sources. Only in 40 to 65 percent or so of the United States resting on the coast of the Atlantic basin, and a fraction of the Everglades, are derechos surpassed in this respect — by landfalling hurricanes, which at their worst may have winds as severe as EF3 tornadoes.

Certain derecho situations are the most common instances of severe weather outbreaks which may become less favorable to tornado production as they become more violent; the height of 30–31 May 1998 upper Middle West-Canada-New York State derecho and the latter stages of significant tornado and severe weather outbreaks in 2003 and 2004 are only three examples of this. Some upper-air measurements used for severe-weather forecasting may reflect this point of diminishing return for tornado formation, and the mentioned three situations were instances during which the rare Particularly Dangerous Situation severe thunderstorm variety of severe weather watches were issued from the Storm Prediction Center of the U.S. National Oceanic & Atmospheric Administration.

Occasionally, a derecho can develop a prominent mesoscale convective vortex, causing its radar signature to resemble a hurricane. A notable example is the 2009 Super Derecho; another is one that occurred on July 21, 2003.

== Location ==
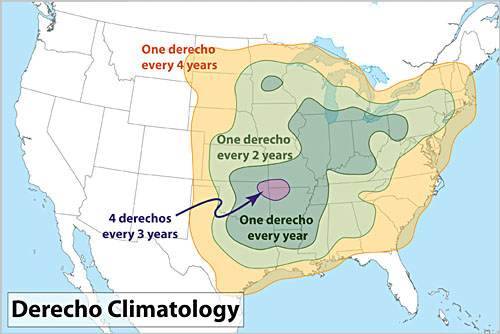
This image shows derecho frequency for the lower 48 United States

Derechos in North America form predominantly from April to August, peaking in frequency from May into July. During this time of year, derechos are mostly found in the Midwestern United States and the U.S. Interior Highlands most commonly from Oklahoma and across the Ohio Valley. During mid-summer when a hot and muggy air mass covers the north-central U.S., they will often develop farther north into Manitoba or Northwestern Ontario, sometimes well north of the Canada–US border.

North Dakota, Minnesota, and upper Michigan are also vulnerable to derecho storms when such conditions are in place. They often occur along stationary fronts on the northern periphery of where the most intense heat and humidity bubble exists. Late-year derechos are normally confined to Texas and the Deep South, although a late-summer derecho struck upper parts of the New York State area after midnight on 7 September 1998. Warm season derechos have greater instability than their cold season counterpart, while cool season derechos have greater shear than their warm season counterpart.

Although these storms most commonly occur in North America, derechos can occur elsewhere in the world, with a few areas relatively frequently. Outside North America, they sometimes are called by different names. For example, in Bangladesh and parts of Eastern India, a type of storm known as "Kalbaisakhi" or "Nor'westers" may be a progressive derecho. One such event occurred on 10 July 2002 in Germany: a serial derecho killed eight people and injured 39 near Berlin, and contributed to the crash of Crossair Flight 850. Derechos occur in southeastern South America (particularly Argentina and southern Brazil) and South Africa as well, and on rarer occasions, close to or north of the 60th parallel in northern Canada. Primarily a mid-latitudes phenomenon, derechos do occur in the Amazon Basin of Brazil. On 8 August 2010, a derecho struck Estonia and tore off the tower of Väike-Maarja Church. Derechos are occasionally observed in China.

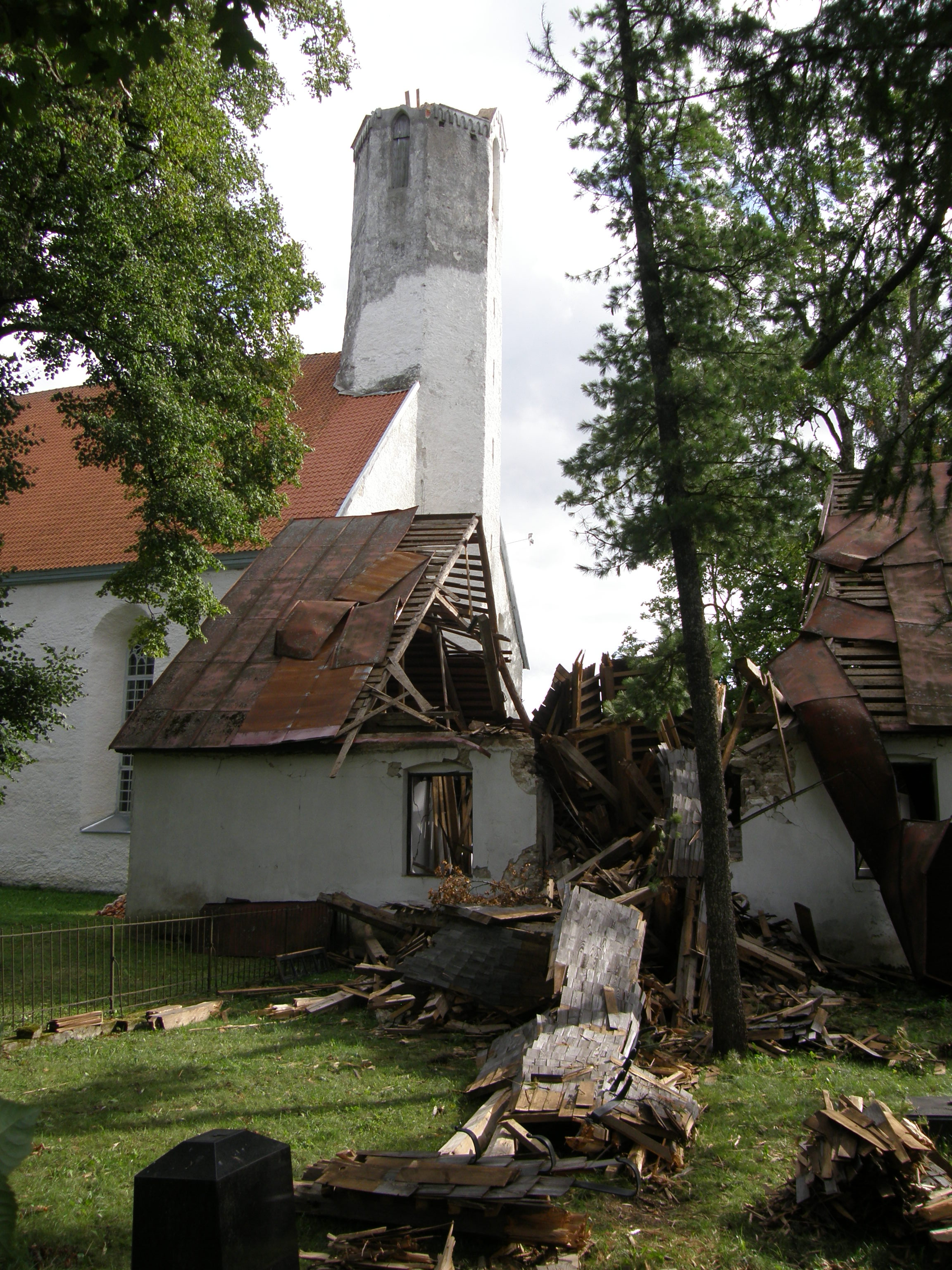
Damage to the Väike-Maarja Church in Estonia after the derecho hit on 8 August 2010

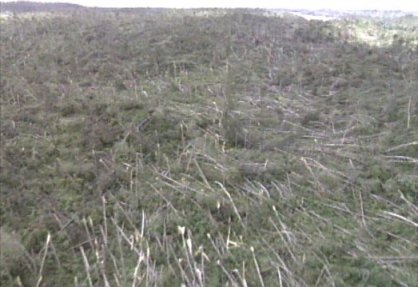
Trees felled by downbursts in the Boundary Waters–Canadian derecho of 1999

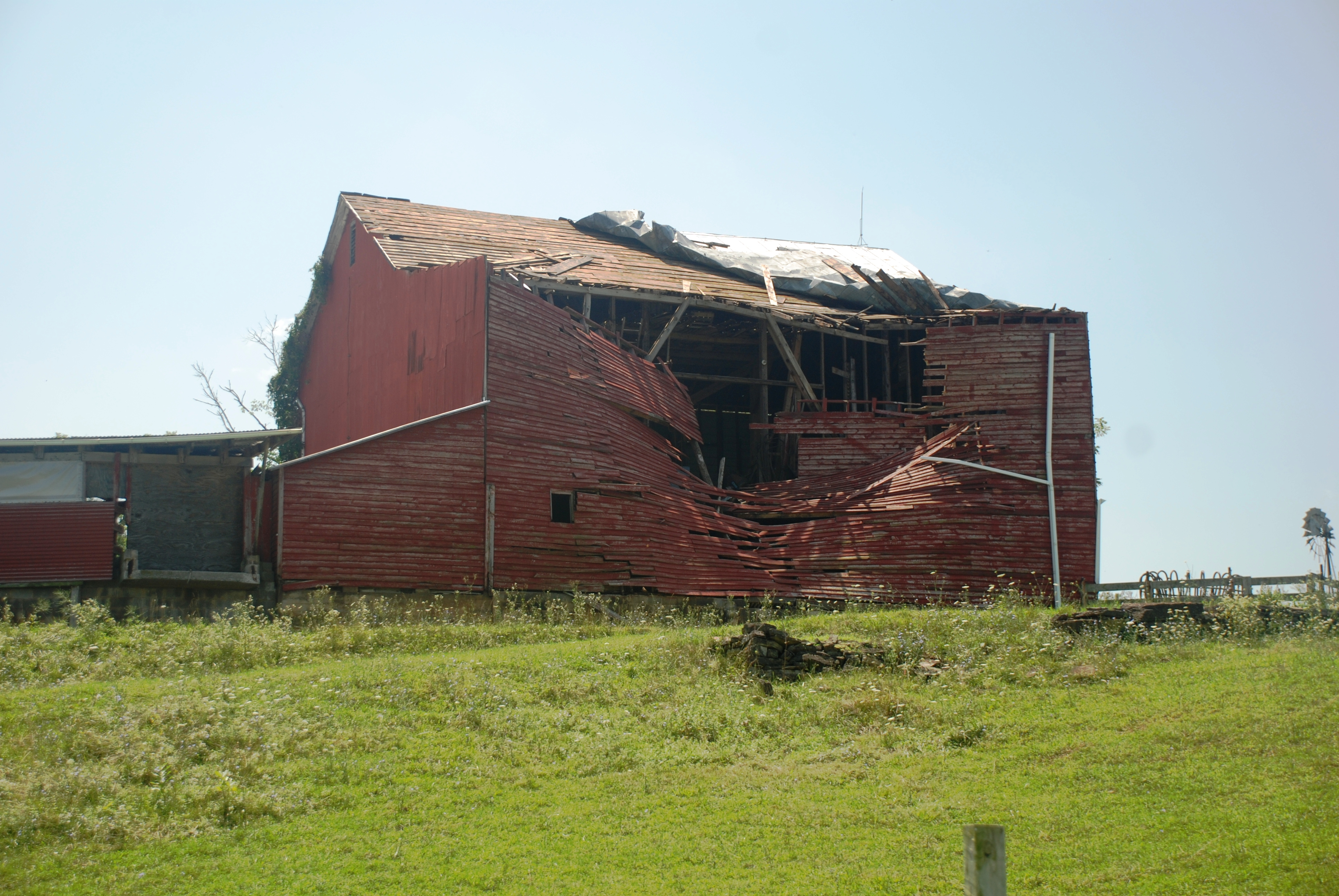
Barn in Mount Solon, Virginia, destroyed by June 2012 North American derecho

== Damage risk ==
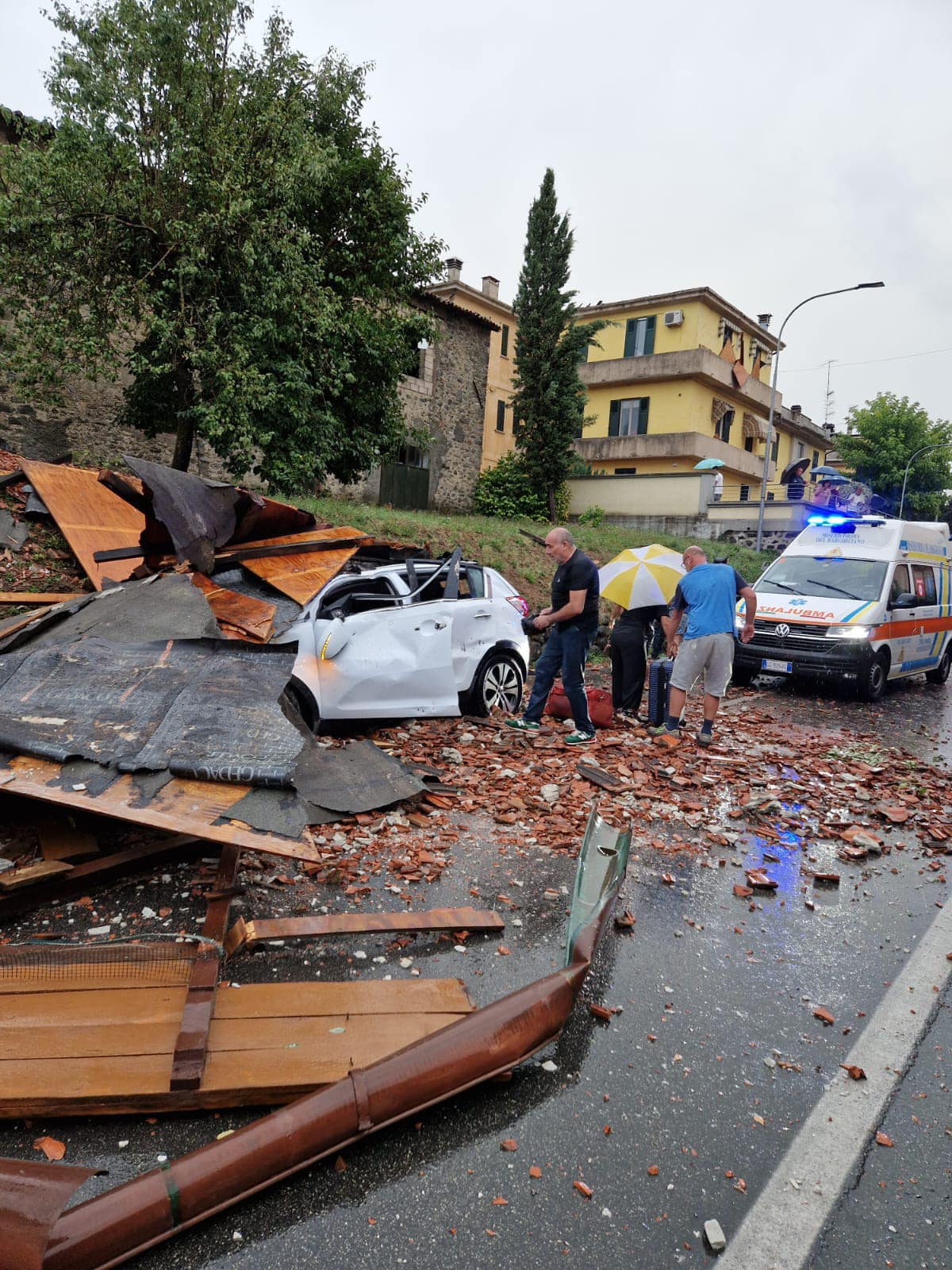
Damage caused by a derecho in Barga, Italy

Since derechos occur during warm months and often in places with cold winter climates, people who are most at risk are those involved in outdoor activities. Campers, hikers, and motorists are most at risk because of falling trees toppled over by straight-line winds. Wide swaths of forest have been felled by such storms. People who live in mobile homes are also at risk; mobile homes that are not anchored to the ground may be overturned from the high winds. Across the United States, Michigan and New York have incurred many of the fatalities from derechos. Prior to Hurricane Katrina, the death tolls from derechos and hurricanes were comparable for the United States.

Derechos may also severely damage an urban area's electrical distribution system, especially if these services are routed above ground. The derecho that struck Chicago, Illinois on 11 July 2011 left more than 860,000 people without electricity. The June 2012 North American derecho took out electrical power to more than 3.7 million customers starting in the Midwestern United States, across the central Appalachians, into the Mid-Atlantic States during a heat wave.

The August 2020 Midwest Derecho delivered a maximum measured wind speed of 56 m/s (109 kn), with damage-estimated speeds as high as 63 m/s (120 kn) in the Cedar Rapids, Iowa area. The storm was referred to as one of the largest "land-based hurricanes" in recorded history spawning 17 confirmed tornadoes across Wisconsin, Illinois, and Indiana. Ten million acres of crops were damaged or destroyed, accounting for roughly a third of the state of Iowa's agricultural area. Over a million homes across the Midwest were without basic services such as water and electricity. Iowa Governor Reynolds requested $4 billion in federal aid to assist in the recovery efforts. Winds were confirmed as having stirred up in Colorado and Nebraska, and then proceeded in force crossing 5 states including Iowa, Minnesota, Illinois, Indiana, and Ohio leaving destruction in excess of $7.5 billion in estimated damages.

The 21 May 2022 derecho in southern Ontario and western Quebec travelled lengthwise along the most heavily populated region in Canada, reaching peak wind speeds of 190 km/h. The derecho killed 10 people and caused $875 million property damage, the sixth largest "insured loss event" in Canadian history. Destruction of utility poles deprived some rural communities of telephone and electricity services for several weeks.

== Aviation ==
Derechos can be hazardous to aviation due to embedded microbursts, downbursts, and downburst clusters. In addition, the powerful updrafts and high cloud tops can cause for dangerous conditions. Their sheer size also makes them very difficult to navigate around.

== See also ==
- Convective storm detection
- Extreme weather
- List of derecho events
- Mesocyclone
- Mesoscale convective vortex (MCV)
- Mesovortex
- Microburst
