= Rear-inflow jet =

Wind component of bow echoes

Conceptual airflow in a squall line with the Rear-inflow jet shown

The rear-inflow jet is a component of bow echoes in a mesoscale convective system that aids in creating a stronger cold pool and downdraft. The jet forms as a response to a convective circulation having upshear tilt and horizontal pressure gradients. The cold pool that comes from the outflow of a storm forms an area of high pressure at the surface. In response to the surface high and warmer temperatures aloft due to convection, a mid-level mesolow forms behind the leading edge of the storm.

With a mid-level area of low pressure, air is drawn in under the trailing stratiform region of precipitation. As air is drawn in on the rear side of the storm, it begins to descend as it approaches the front line of the cells. Before reaching the leading edge, the jet descends to the surface as a strong downdraft, creating straight-line winds.

Any mature mesoscale convective system is capable of developing its own rear-inflow jet, but questions remain as to what influences the strength of the jet. While the diabatic effects of sublimation, melting and evaporation play a role in influencing jet strength, these effects do not account for cases with strong rear-inflow jets. However, the diabatic effects are responsible for the jet subsiding behind the leading edge of the MCS. The sinking of the jet first starts when the mid level inflow goes under the trailing stratiform cloud before descending to the melting layer.

There are other factors that contribute to the strength of any rear inflow jet. The strength of a rear inflow jet can be greatly increased with induced vortices at the end of the line, called "line-end vortices" or "book-end vortices." These vortices at either end of the line will help reinforce the rear inflow towards the center of the line. The other factor that can help strengthen the jet is an environment in which the large scale flow is feeding/forcing mid-level air into the rear end of the storm.

== See also ==
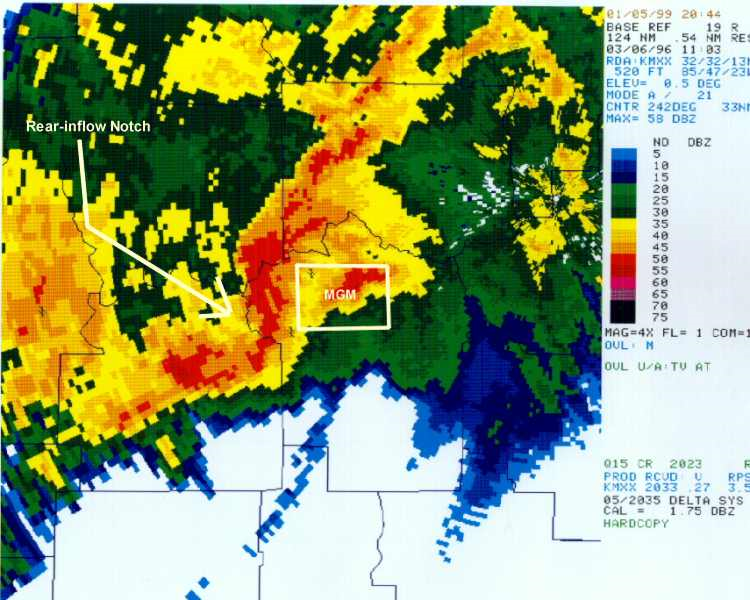
Rear-inflow notch caused by the sinking of the jet behind a bow echo line

- Convective storm detection
- Derecho
- Line echo wave pattern
- Mesovortex
