= Mesoscale convective system =

Complex of thunderstorms organized on a larger scale

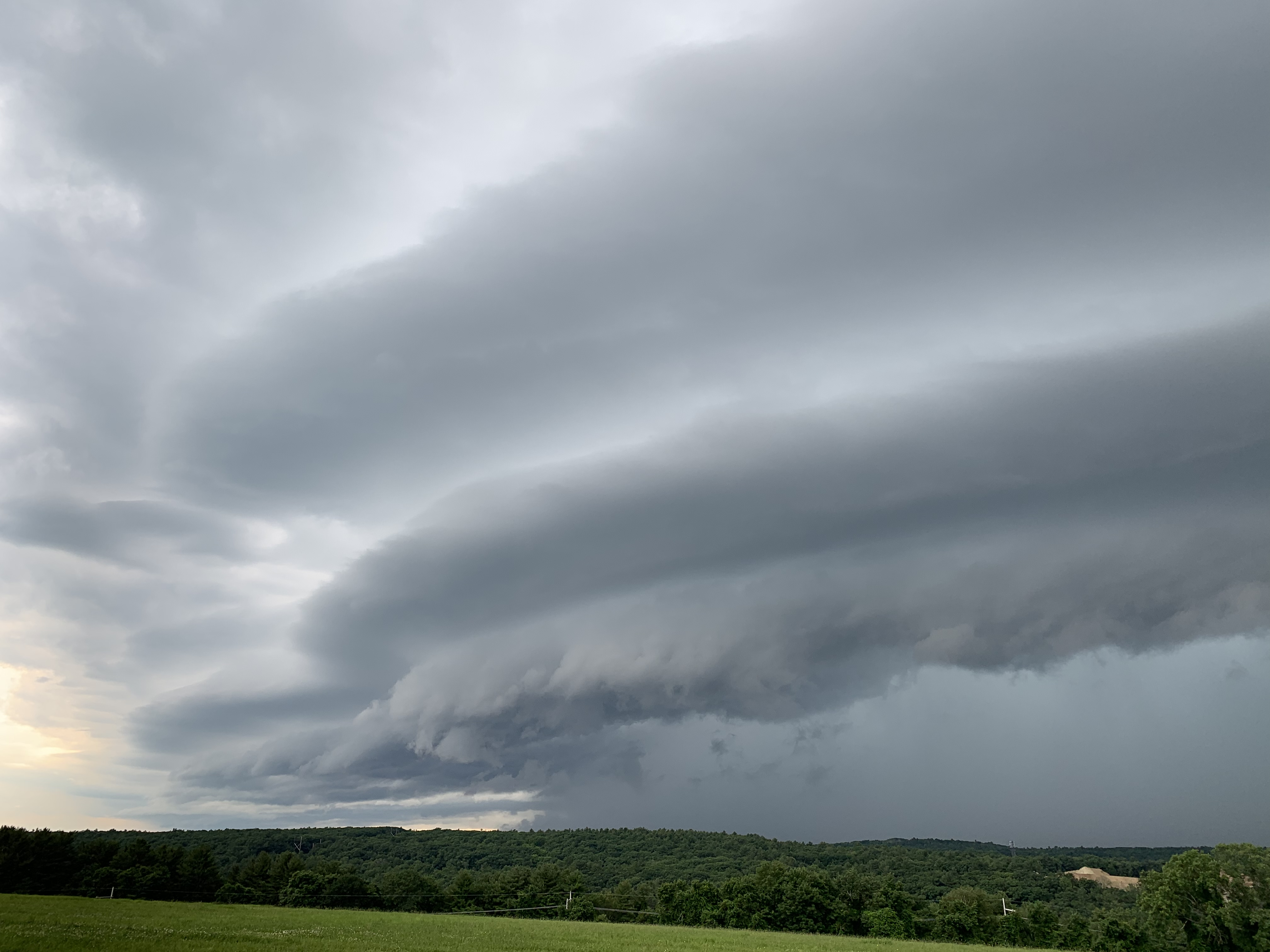
A shelf cloud, such as this one, can be a sign that a squall is imminent. This is an example of a MCS.

A mesoscale convective system (MCS) is a complex of thunderstorms that becomes organized on a scale larger than the individual thunderstorms but smaller than extratropical cyclones, and normally persists for several hours or more. A mesoscale convective system's overall cloud and precipitation pattern may be round or linear in shape, and include weather systems such as tropical cyclones, squall lines, lake-effect snow events, polar lows, and mesoscale convective complexes (MCCs), and generally forms near weather fronts. The type that forms during the warm season over land has been noted across North and South America, Europe, and Asia, with a maximum in activity noted during the late afternoon and evening hours.

Forms of MCS that develop within the tropics use either the Intertropical Convergence Zone (ITCZ) or monsoon troughs as a focus for their development, generally within the warm season between spring and fall. One exception is that of lake-effect snow bands, which form due to cold air moving across relatively warm bodies of water, and occurs from fall through spring. Polar lows are a second special class of MCS which form at high latitudes during the cold season. Once the parent MCS dies, later thunderstorm development can occur in connection with its remnant mesoscale convective vortex (MCV). Mesoscale convective systems are important to the United States rainfall climatology over the Great Plains since they bring the region about half of their annual warm season rainfall.

== Definition ==
Mesoscale convective systems are thunderstorm regions which may be round or linear in shape, on the order of 100 kilometres (62 mi) or more across in one direction but smaller than extratropical cyclones, and include systems such as tropical cyclones, squall lines, and mesoscale convective complexes (MCCs), among others. MCS is a more generalized term which includes systems that do not satisfy the stricter size, shape, or duration criteria of an MCC. They tend to form near weather fronts and move into areas of 1000-500 mb thickness diffluence, which are areas where the low to mid level temperature gradient broadens, which generally steers the thunderstorm clusters into the warm sector of extratropical cyclones, or equatorward of warm fronts. They can also form along any convergent zones within the tropics. A recent study found that they tend to form when the surface temperature varies with more than 5 degrees between day and night. Their formation has been noted worldwide, from the Meiyu front in the far East to the deep tropics.

== Thunderstorm types and levels of organization ==
Conditions favorable for thunderstorm types and complexes

There are four main types of thunderstorms: single-cell, multi-cell, squall line (also called multi-cell line) and supercell. Which type forms depends on the instability and relative wind conditions at different layers of the atmosphere ("wind shear"). Single-cell thunderstorms form in environments of low vertical wind shear and last only 20–30 minutes. Organized thunderstorms and thunderstorm clusters/lines can have longer life cycles as they form in environments of sufficient moisture, significant vertical wind shear (normally greater than 25 knots (13 m/s) in the lowest 6 kilometres (3.7 mi) of the troposphere)), which aids the development of stronger updrafts as well as various forms of severe weather. The supercell is the strongest of the thunderstorms, most commonly associated with large hail, high winds, and tornado formation.

Precipitable water values of greater than 31.8 millimetres (1.25 in) favor the development of organized thunderstorm complexes. Those with heavy rainfall normally have precipitable water values greater than 36.9 millimetres (1.45 in). Upstream values of CAPE of greater than 800 J/kg are usually required for the development of organized convection.

== Types ==
=== Mesoscale convective complex ===
A mesoscale convective complex (MCC) is a unique kind of mesoscale convective system which is defined by characteristics observed in infrared satellite imagery. Their area of cold cloud tops exceeds 100,000 square kilometres (39,000 mi^{2}) with temperature less than or equal to −32 °C (−26 °F); and an area of cloud top of 50,000 square kilometres (19,000 mi^{2}) with temperature less than or equal to −52 °C (−62 °F). Size definitions must be met for six hours or greater. Its maximum extent is defined as when the cloud shield, or the overall cloud formation, reaches its maximum area. Its eccentricity (minor axis/major axis) is greater than or equal to 0.7 at maximum extent, so they are fairly round. They are long-lived, nocturnal in formation as they tend to form overnight, and commonly contain heavy rainfall, wind, hail, lightning and possibly tornadoes.

=== Squall line ===
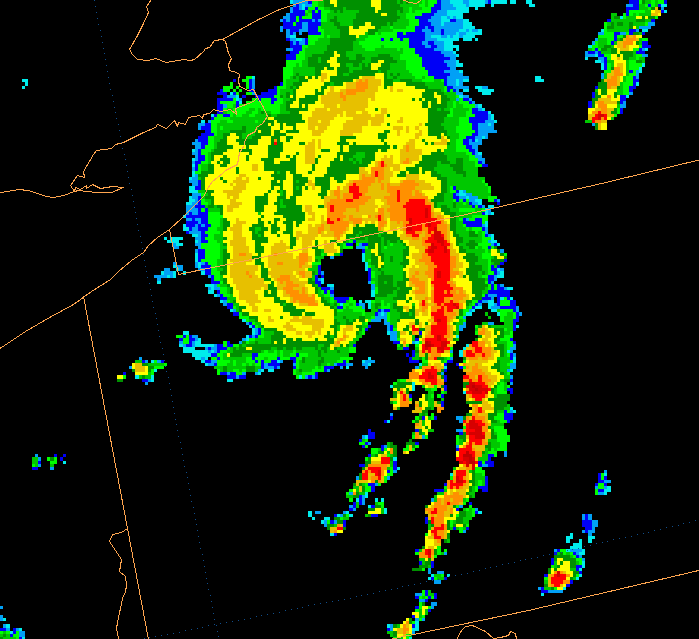
A mesoscale convective vortex over Pennsylvania with a trailing squall line.

A squall line is an elongated line of severe thunderstorms that can form along and/or ahead of a cold front. In the early 20th century, the term was used as a synonym for cold front. The squall line contains heavy precipitation, hail, frequent lightning, strong straight-line winds, and possibly tornadoes and waterspouts. Severe weather, in form of strong straight-line winds can be expected in areas where the squall line itself is in the shape of a bow echo, within the portion of the line which bows out the most. Tornadoes can be found along waves within a line echo wave pattern, or LEWP, where mesoscale low-pressure areas are present. Some bow echoes that develop within the summer season are known as derechos, and they move quite fast through large sections of territory. On the back edge of the rain shield associated with mature squall lines, a wake low can form, which is a mesoscale low-pressure area that forms behind the mesoscale high-pressure system normally present under the rain canopy, which are sometimes associated with a heat burst. Another term that may be used in association with squall line and bow echoes is quasi-linear convective systems (QLCSs).

=== Tropical cyclone ===
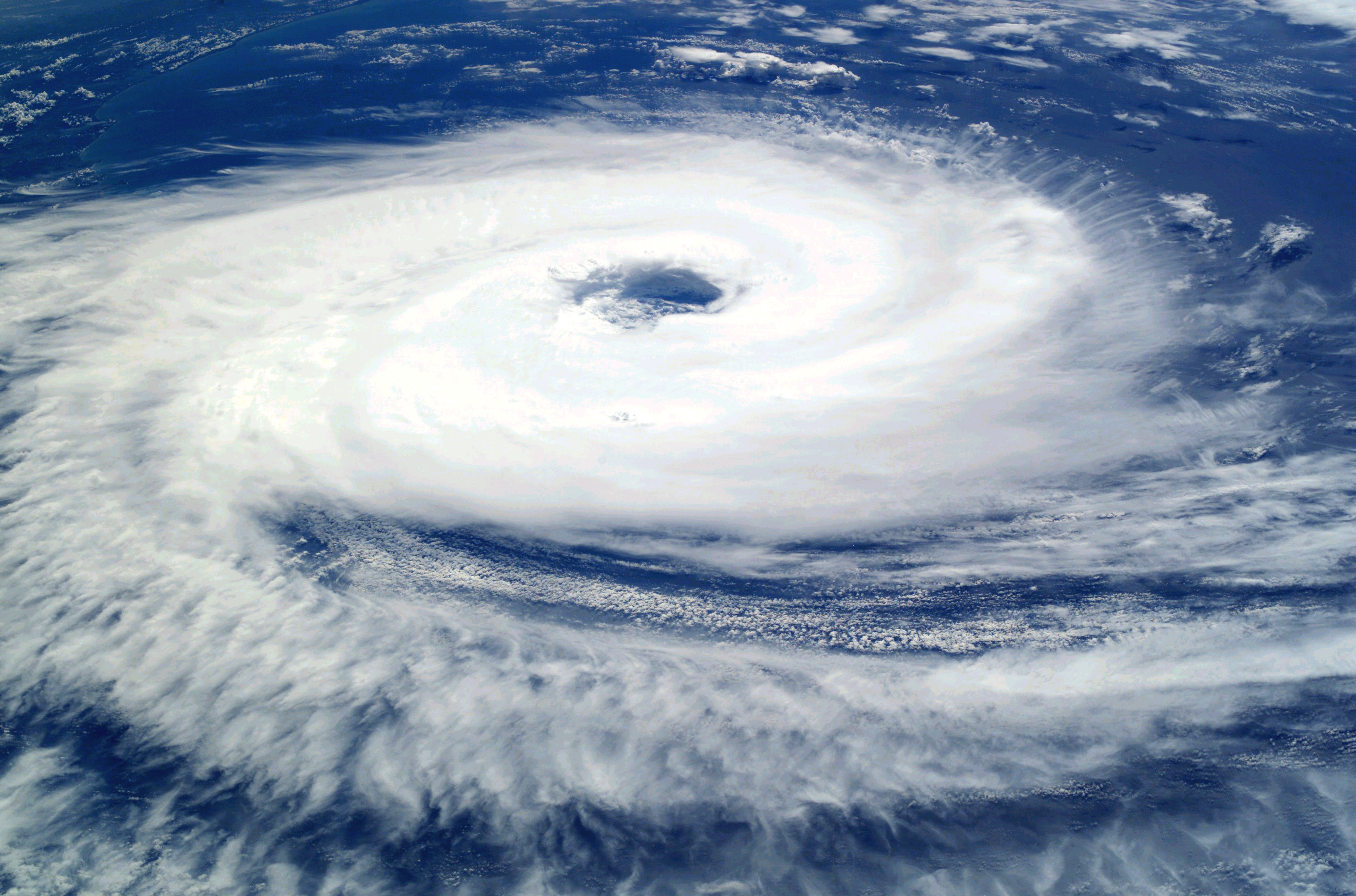
Hurricane Catarina, a rare South Atlantic tropical cyclone viewed from the International Space Station on March 26, 2004

A tropical cyclone is a fairly symmetric storm system characterized by a low pressure center and numerous thunderstorms that produce strong winds and flooding rain. A tropical cyclone feeds on the heat released when moist air rises, resulting in condensation of water vapour contained in the moist air. It is fueled by a different heat mechanism than other cyclonic windstorms such as nor'easters, European windstorms, and polar lows, leading to their classification as "warm core" storm systems.

The term "tropical" refers to both the geographic origin of these systems, which form often in tropical regions of the globe, and their formation in Maritime Tropical air masses. The term "cyclone" refers to such storms' cyclonic nature, with counterclockwise rotation in the Northern Hemisphere and clockwise rotation in the Southern Hemisphere. Depending on their location and strength, tropical cyclones are referred to by other names, such as hurricane, typhoon, tropical storm, cyclonic storm, tropical depression, or simply as a cyclone. Generally speaking, a tropical cyclone is referred to as a hurricane (from the name of the ancient Central American deity of wind, Huracan) in the Atlantic and eastern Pacific oceans, a typhoon across the northwest Pacific Ocean, and a cyclone across in the southern hemisphere and Indian Ocean.

Tropical cyclones can produce extremely powerful winds and torrential rain, as well as high waves and damaging storm surge. They develop over large bodies of warm water, and lose their strength if they move over land. This is the reason coastal regions can receive significant damage from a tropical cyclone, while inland regions are relatively safe from the strong winds. Heavy rains, however, can produce significant flooding inland, and storm surges can produce extensive coastal flooding up to 40 kilometres (25 mi) from the coastline. Although their effects on human populations can be devastating, tropical cyclones can also relieve drought conditions. They also carry heat and energy away from the tropics and transport it toward temperate latitudes, which makes them an important part of the global atmospheric circulation mechanism. As a result, tropical cyclones help to maintain equilibrium in the Earth's troposphere.

Many tropical cyclones develop when the atmospheric conditions around a weak disturbance in the atmosphere are favorable. Others form when other types of cyclones acquire tropical characteristics. Tropical systems are then moved by steering winds in the troposphere; if the conditions remain favorable, the tropical disturbance intensifies, and can even develop an eye. On the other end of the spectrum, if the conditions around the system deteriorate or the tropical cyclone makes landfall, the system weakens and eventually dissipates. A tropical cyclone can become extratropical as it moves toward higher latitudes if its energy source changes from heat released by condensation to differences in temperature between air masses; From an operational standpoint, a tropical cyclone is usually not considered to become a subtropical cyclone during its extratropical transition.

=== Lake-effect snow ===
Lake-effect precipitation coming off Lake Erie, as seen by NEXRAD radar, October 12–13, 2006

Lake-effect snow is produced in the winter in the shape of one or more elongated bands when cold winds move across long expanses of warmer lake water, providing energy and picking up water vapor which freezes and is deposited on the lee shores. The same effect over bodies of salt water is called ocean effect snow, sea effect snow, or even bay effect snow. The effect is enhanced when the moving air mass is uplifted by the orographic effect of higher elevations on the downwind shores. This uplifting can produce narrow, but very intense bands of precipitation, which is deposited at a rate of many inches of snow per hour and often brings copious snowfall totals. The areas affected by lake-effect snow are called snowbelts. This effect occurs in many locations throughout the world, but is best known in the populated areas of the Great Lakes of North America.

If the air temperature is not low enough to keep the precipitation frozen, it falls as lake-effect rain. In order for lake-effect rain or snow to form, the air moving across the lake must be significantly cooler than the surface air (which is likely to be near the temperature of the water surface). Specifically, the air temperature at the altitude where the air pressure is 850 millibars (or 1.5 kilometres (0.93 mi) altitude) should be 13 °C (24 °F) lower than the temperature of the air at the surface. Lake-effect occurring when the air at 850 millibars is 25 °C (45 °F) colder than the water temperature can produce thundersnow, snow showers accompanied by lightning and thunder (due to the larger amount of energy available from the increased instability).

=== Polar low ===
A polar low is a small-scale, symmetric, short-lived atmospheric low-pressure system (depression) that is found over the ocean areas poleward of the main polar front in both the Northern and Southern Hemispheres. The systems usually have a horizontal length scale of less than 1,000 kilometres (620 mi) and exist for no more than a couple of days. They are part of the larger class of mesoscale weather systems. Polar lows can be difficult to detect using conventional weather reports and are a hazard to high-latitude operations, such as shipping and gas and oil platforms. Polar lows have been referred to by many other terms, such as polar mesoscale vortex, Arctic hurricane, Arctic low, and cold air depression. Today the term is usually reserved for the more vigorous systems that have near-surface winds of at least 17 metres per second (38 mph).

== Locations of formation ==
=== Great Plains of the United States ===
Typical evolution of thunderstorms (a) into a bow echo (b, c) and into a comma echo (d). Dashed line indicates axis of greatest potential for downbursts. Arrows indicate wind flow relative to the storm. Area C is most prone to supporting tornado development.

Thunderstorm areas are most prevalent in the Plains from May to September. That is when mesoscale convective systems develop here, mainly between 6 and 9 p.m. These systems bring 30% to 70% of the annual warm season rainfall to the Plains. A subset of these systems, known as mesoscale convective complexes, lead to up to 10% of the annual rainfall across the Plains and Midwest. Squall lines account for 30% of the large thunderstorm complexes which move through the region.

=== Europe ===
While most form over the continent, some MCSs form during the second half of August and September over the western Mediterranean. MCS triggering over Europe is strongly tied to mountain ranges. On average, a European MCS moves east-northeast, forming near 3 p.m. local solar time, lasts 5.5 hours, dissipating near 9 p.m. LST. Around 20% of the MCSs over Europe do not form during maximum heating. Their average maximum extent is around 9,000 square kilometres (3,500 mi^{2}).

=== Tropics ===
Mesoscale convective systems, which can evolve into tropical cyclones, form along areas such as tropical waves or easterly waves which progress westward along monsoon troughs and the Intertropical Convergence Zone in regions of ample low level moisture, convergent surface winds, and divergent winds aloft. This typically occurs north of the equator from Africa across the Atlantic and eastern Pacific oceans, as well as across the northwest and southwest Pacific oceans, from Australia eastward into Oceania, the Indian Ocean, Indonesia, and from southeast Brazil into the southern Atlantic Ocean. It is also noted on occasion in the southeast Pacific Ocean mild to cool ENSO years, outside of El Niño. More intense systems form over land than water.

=== Lee of warm water bodies in the winter ===
In the cases of Lake-effect snow and polar lows, the convective systems form over warm water bodies when cold air sweeps over their surface and leads to an increase in moisture and significant vertical motion. This vertical motion leads to the development of showers and thunderstorms in areas of cyclonic flow on the backside of extratropical cyclones.

== Remnants ==
A mesoscale convective vortex (MCV) is a mid-level low-pressure center within an MCS that pulls winds into a circling pattern, or vortex. Once the parent MCS dies, this vortex can persist and lead to future convective development. With a core only 30 miles (48 km) to 60 miles (97 km) and up to 8 kilometres (5 mi) deep, an MCV can occasionally spawn a mesoscale surface low-pressure area which appears on mesoscale surface weather analyses. But an MCV can take on a life of its own, persisting for several days after its parent MCS has dissipated. The orphaned MCV will sometimes then become the seed of the next thunderstorm outbreak. An MCV that moves into tropical waters, such as the Gulf of Mexico, can serve as the nucleus for a tropical storm or hurricane. A good example of this is Hurricane Barry (2019).

== See also ==
- Convective storm detection
- Mesovortex
