= Bow echo =

Mesoscale convective system shaped like an archer's bow

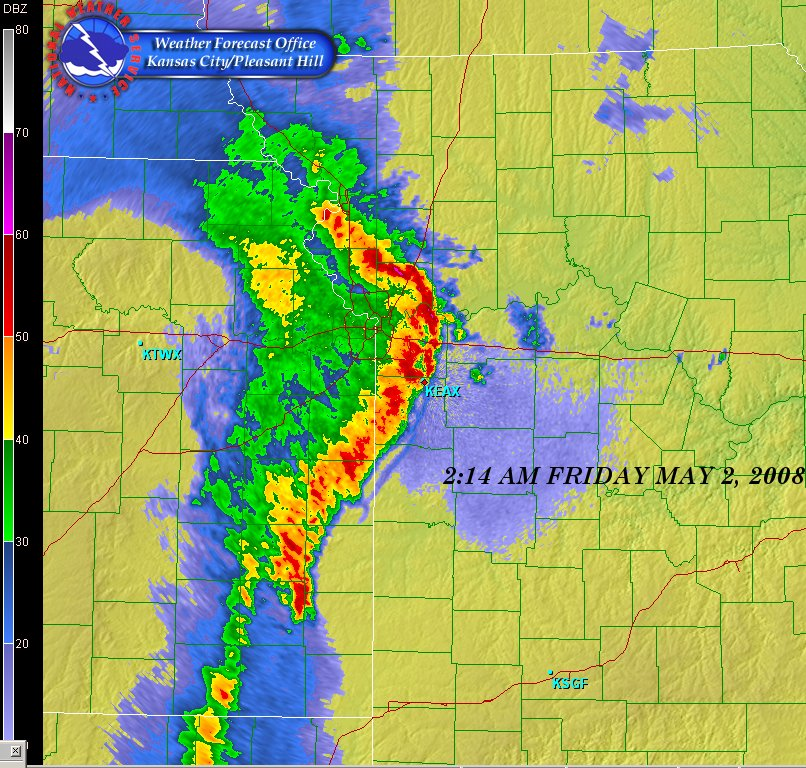
Radar image of a bow echo crossing Kansas City at 2:14 AM on May 2, 2008 (NWS Kansas City)

A bow echo is the characteristic radar return from a mesoscale convective system that is shaped like an archer's bow. These systems can produce severe straight-line winds and occasionally tornadoes, causing major damage. They can also become derechos or form Line echo wave pattern (LEWP).

== Research ==
The term "bow echo" was first used by Theodore Fujita in his May 1978 paper "Manual of Downburst Identification for Project NIMROD." In 2004, research was done to better anticipate the formation of bow echoes, specifically the formation of bow echoes from weakly organized squall lines and supercells. Researchers determined that bow echoes were most likely to occur in weakly organized cells. A Midwest Bow Echo Workshop was held in 2007, at which meteorologists gathered to share their research to better understand bow echoes.

== Formation ==
A bow echo is associated with squall lines or lines of convective thunderstorms. These echoes can range in size from 20 to 200 km, and have a life span of 3 to 6 hours. Bow echoes tend to develop when moderate to strong wind shear exists in the lower 2 to 3 km of the atmosphere. While similar to squall lines, bow echoes are smaller in scale and are moved by the wind inside them. They tend to push outward and after time die out. A bow echo also lowers the chance of a tornado being formed in the storm itself. The "bow shaped" echo is a result of focusing of the strong flow at the rear of the system. Especially strong bow echoes that cause devastating damage all along the width of the storm are often called derechos.

=== Rear inflow jet ===
The formation of a bow echo requires a strong elevated rear inflow jet at mid-levels. The strength of the cold pool and mesohigh at the surface as well as warmer temperatures aloft due to convection works to create a mesolow at mid-levels which strengthens the jet. Upon reaching the edge of the convection the jet descends and spreads along the surface, generating straight-line winds.

=== Book end vortices ===
After the rear inflow jet has bowed the storm system, book end or line end vortices develop on either side of the jet. These vortices are similar in strength. Due to the small size of the bow echo, the vortices help increase the mid-level flow between them, which strengthens the rear inflow jet. The surface winds increase from the descending jet. As the life of the storm increases, the Coriolis force acts to intensify the cyclonic vortex and weaken the anticyclonic vortex. The system then develops an asymmetric comma-shaped echo. Some embedded tornadoes or gustnadoes develop within these vortices.

Typical evolution of a thunderstorm radar echo (a) into a bow echo (b, c) and into a comma echo (d). Dashed line indicates axis of greatest potential for downbursts. Arrows indicate wind flow relative to the storm. Note regions of cyclonic rotation (C) and anticyclonic rotation (A); both regions, especially C, are capable of supporting tornado development in some cases.

== Strongest winds ==
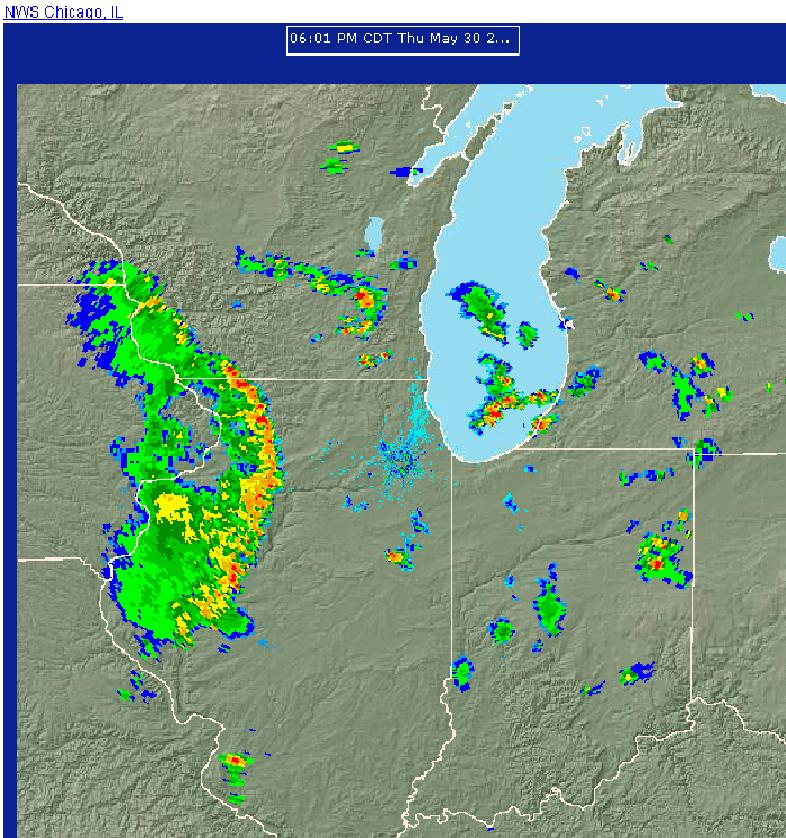
A bow echo west of the Chicago area

Damaging straight-line winds often occur near the center of a bow echo. Damage from all severe thunderstorm winds accounts for half of all severe reports in the lower 48 states of the US, and is more common than damage from tornadoes. In a type of long-lived and powerful bow echo known as a derecho, wind speeds can reach up to or exceed 100 mph (160 km/h) and can produce a damage path extending for hundreds of miles. Bow echoes are capable of producing straight-line winds that are just as strong as many tornadoes. Indeed, a strong bow echo will produce more widespread and intense damage than the majority of tornadoes. Also, bow echoes in the form of a line echo wave pattern create a favorable environment for tornadoes to form.

The semiarid climate and rugged terrain in the interior west of the United States do not favour the development of bow echoes. However, on 21 April 2011, a bow echo associated with a fast-moving mid-tropospheric perturbation formed across the Great Salt Lake (GSL) in Utah, producing damaging winds along its path.

== Notable bow echo storms ==
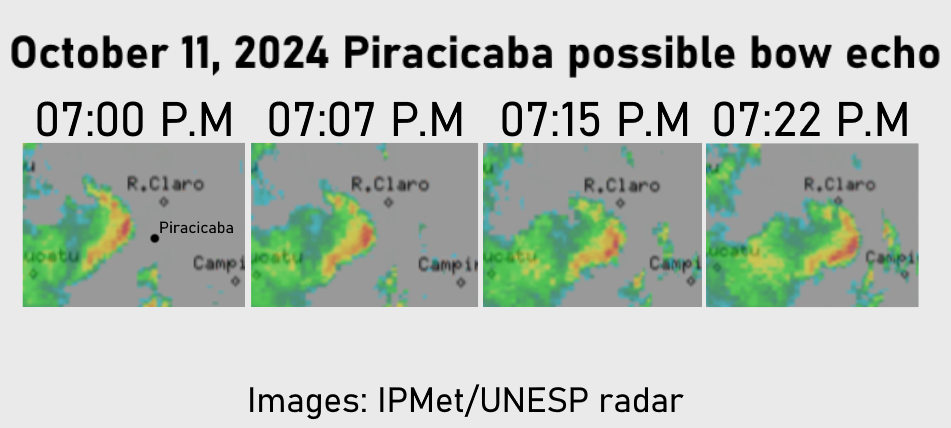
Bow echo moving through Piracicaba, Brazil

In 1674, the city of Utrecht in the Netherlands was devastated by a storm now thought to have been a bow echo storm. Some of the damage to the city is still visible, and severe storm activity was recorded across other areas of Europe.

In the 2014 Pentecost weekend storms in Europe, a violent bow echo moved across the Rhine-Ruhr metropolitan region, causing 6 fatalities and an estimated 650 million euros in damages.

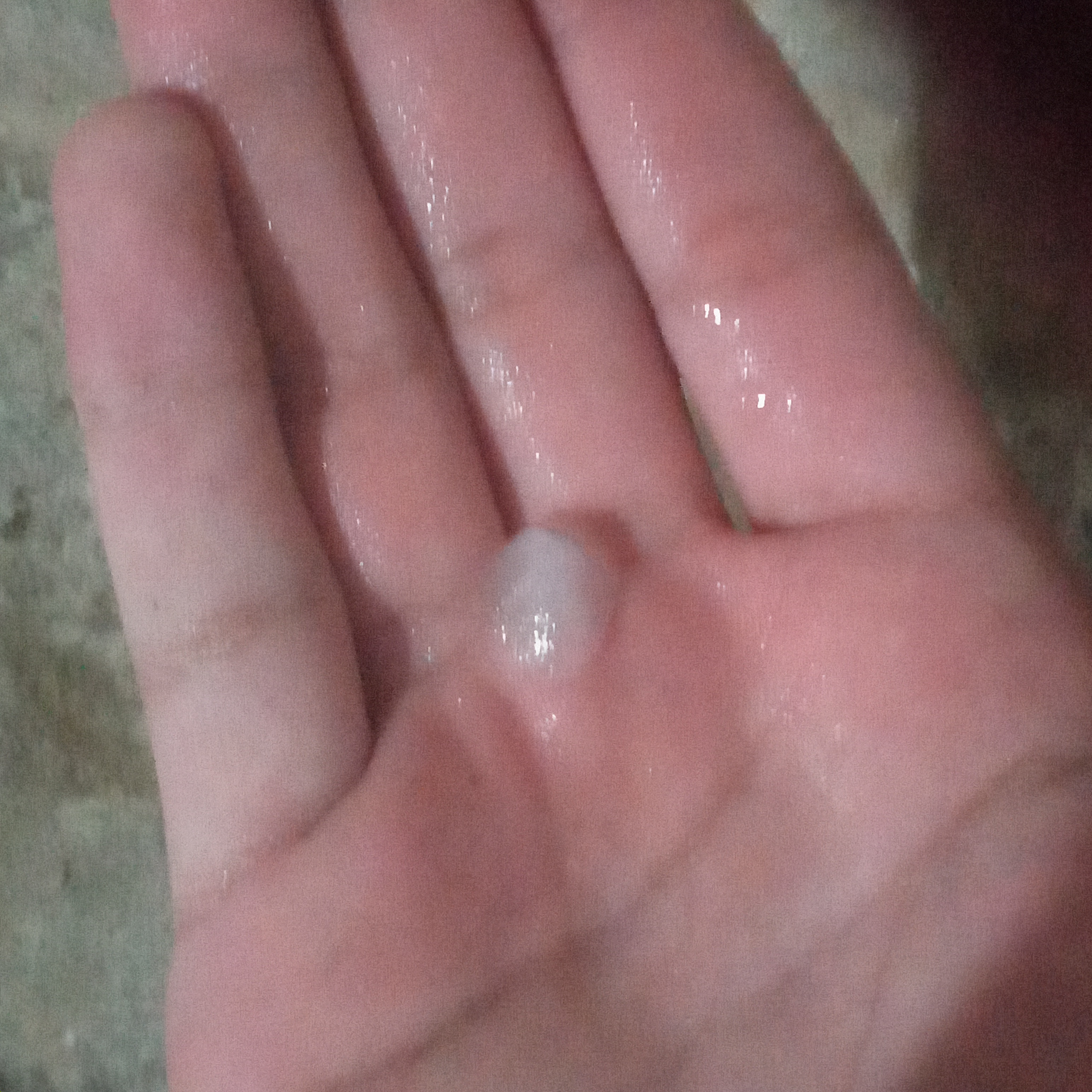
Hailstone caught during the storm in Piracicaba, Brazil

On the evening of October 11, 2024, a series of bow echoes swept across the state of São Paulo, Brazil. The first storm hit the city of São Paulo, bringing widespread damage with wind gusts of up to 75 mph (120 km/h) and resulting in two deaths, one directly and one indirectly caused. Damages were estimated at 1.65 billion BRL. Another storm moved toward Piracicaba and its metropolitan area, producing wind gusts of up to 52 mph (85 km/h) and small hail. Both storms brought down trees and light poles. Six additional fatalities were reported elsewhere in the state due to the severe weather linked to the bow echoes.

== See also ==
- Convective storm detection
- Derecho
- Gustnado
- Hook echo
- Mesoscale convective system
- Outflow boundary
- Rear-inflow jet
- Tornado
