= Line echo wave pattern =

Weather radar formation

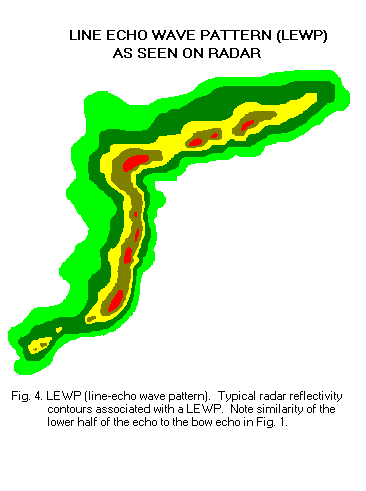
Radar schematic of a LEWP. This shape is a single wave along the pattern, for real LEWPs this shape is tessellated repeatedly in a linear fashion

A line echo wave pattern (LEWP) is a weather radar formation in which a single line of thunderstorms presenting multiple bow echoes forms equatorward of a mesoscale low-pressure area with a rotating "head". LEWP often are associated with a multiple-bow serial derecho and often produce tornadoes, some of which can be strong. The existence of a LEWP on radar means that a serial derecho has developed or is likely to develop soon, much as a hook echo indicates the same for a tornado.

== Formation ==
A LEWP, according to the NWS, is defined as "a squall line that has developed into a wave-like pattern due to acceleration at one end of the line and deceleration along the portion immediately adjacent."

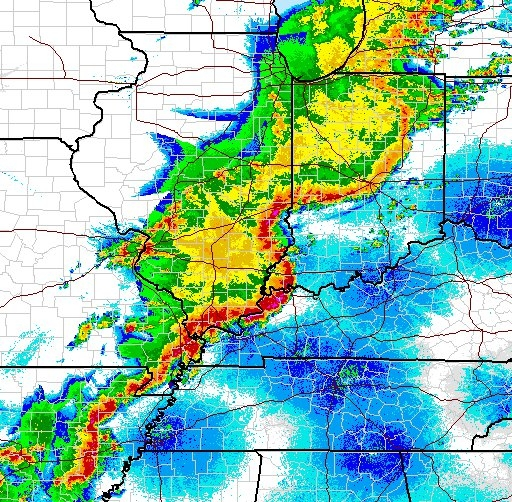
A LEWP in Illinois/Indiana and Arkansas, associated with a very large derecho

A LEWP is an extension of the concept of the bow echo, which usually indicates a powerful convective windstorm. Areas hit by the apices of bows often see the worst weather, with the highest winds and very heavy rain. However, if the sides of the bows reach enough of an orientation parallel to the derecho's movement, a very long-duration heavy rain event can result, leading to flash flooding. A serial derecho can be in the form of a LEWP or a single, very large bow echo. In theory, a LEWPs formation is dependent on varying environmental conditions in different regions of the respective LEWP. In many LEWPs, outflow induced winds behind the leading edge tend to influence this edge, appearing as a bulge in reflectivity on radar. Another conditional scenario is varying amounts of shear parallel and along the line.

== See also ==
- Derecho
- Hook echo
- Convective storm detection
- Mesoscale convective system (MCS) and mesoscale convective complex (MCC)
- Mesoscale convective vortex (MCV) and mesolow
- Rear-inflow jet (RIJ)
