= Squall =

Short, sharp increase in wind speed

A video recorded nearing the end of a squall, caused by a dry microburst (strong downdraft); after this video was shot, it started raining.

A squall is a sudden, sharp increase in wind speed lasting minutes, as opposed to a wind gust, which lasts for only seconds. They are usually associated with active weather, such as rain showers, thunderstorms, or heavy snow. Squalls refer to the increase of the sustained winds over that time interval, as there may be higher gusts during a squall event. They usually occur in a region of strong sinking air or cooling in the mid-atmosphere. These force strong localized upward motions at the leading edge of the region of cooling, which then enhances local downward motions just in its wake.

== Etymology ==
There are different versions of the word's origins:

- By one version, the word appears to be Nordic in origin, but its etymology is considered obscure. It probably has its roots in the word skvala an Old Norse word meaning literally to squeal.
- By another version, it is an alteration of squeal influenced by bawl.

== Character of the wind ==
The term "squall" is used to refer to a sudden wind-speed increase lasting minutes. In 1962 the World Meteorological Organization (WMO) defined that to be classified as a "squall", the wind must increase at least 8 metres per second (29 km/h; 18 mph) and must attain a top speed of at least 11 metres per second (40 km/h; 25 mph), lasting at least one minute in duration. In Australia, a squall is defined to last for several minutes before the wind returns to the long-term mean value. In either case, a squall is defined to last about half as long as the definition of sustained wind in its respective country. Usually, this sudden violent wind is associated with briefly heavy precipitation as squall line.

== Regional terms ==
=== Argentina ===
Known locally as pamperos, these are characterized as strong downsloped winds that move across the pampas, eventually making it to the Atlantic Ocean.

=== Australia ===
In southeastern Australia, the colloquial name for a squall is southerly buster, which is an abrupt southerly wind change in the southern regions of New South Wales and Victoria, Australia, which approaches from the southeast, mainly on a hot day, bringing in cool, usually severe weather and a dramatic temperature drop, thus ultimately replacing and relieving the prior hot conditions.

=== Central America ===
Offshore Central America, a gully squall is characterized by strong increases of the wind forced through sharp mountain valleys on the Pacific Ocean side of the isthmus.

=== Cuba ===
A bayamo is a squall emanating from tropical thunderstorms near the Bight of Bayamo.

=== Pacific Northwest (North America) ===
In the Pacific Northwest, a squall is a short but furious rainstorm with strong winds, often small in area and moving at high speed, especially as a maritime term. A strong Katabatic outflow occurring in fjords and inlets is referred to by mariners as a squamish.

=== South Africa ===
Bull's Eye Squall is a term used offshore South Africa for a squall forming in fair weather. It is named for the appearance of the small isolated cloud marking the top of the squall.

=== Philippines (West Pacific) ===
In most parts of the country, squalls are called subasko and are characterized by heavy rains driven by blustery winds. Local fishermen at sea are often on the lookout for signs of impending squalls on the open water and rush to shore at its early signs.

=== South-East Asia ===
"Barat" is a term for a northwest squall in Manado Bay in Sulawesi.

"Sumatra squall" is a term used in Singapore and Peninsular Malaysia for squall lines that form over the island of Sumatra and move east across the Straits of Malacca. Gusts can reach up to 28 m/s (100 km/h).

== Severe weather ==
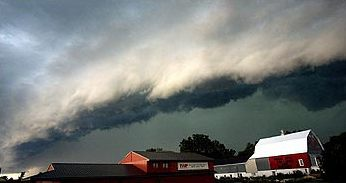
A shelf cloud such as this one can be a sign that a squall is imminent

A squall line is an organized line of thunderstorms. It is classified as a multi-cell cluster, meaning a thunderstorm complex comprising many individual updrafts. They are also called multi-cell lines. Squalls are sometimes associated with hurricanes or other cyclones, but they can also occur independently. Most commonly, independent squalls occur along front lines, and may contain heavy precipitation, hail, frequent lightning, dangerous straight line winds, and possibly funnel clouds, tornadoes and waterspouts. Squall lines require significant low-level warmth and humidity, a nearby frontal zone, and vertical wind shear from an angle behind the frontal boundary. The strong winds at the surface are usually a reflection of dry air intruding into the line of storms, which when saturated, falls quickly to ground level due to its much higher density before it spreads out downwind. Significant squall lines with multiple bow echoes are known as derechos.

=== Squall line life cycle ===
There are several forms of mesoscale meteorology, including simplistic isolated thunderstorms unrelated to advancing cold fronts, to the more complex daytime/nocturnal mesoscale convective system (MCS) and mesoscale convective complex (MCC), to squall line thunderstorms.

==== Formation ====
The main driving force behind squall line creation is attributed to the process of in-filling of multiple thunderstorms and/or a single area of thunderstorms expanding outward within the leading space of an advancing cold front.

===== Pressure perturbations =====
Pressure perturbations within an extent of a thunderstorm are noteworthy. With buoyancy rapid within the lower and mid-levels of a mature thunderstorm, one might believe that low pressure dominates in the mesoscale environment. However, this is not the case. With downdrafts ushering colder air from mid-levels, hitting ground and propagating away in all directions, high pressure is to be found widely at surface levels, usually indicative of strong (potentially damaging) winds.

===== Wind shear =====
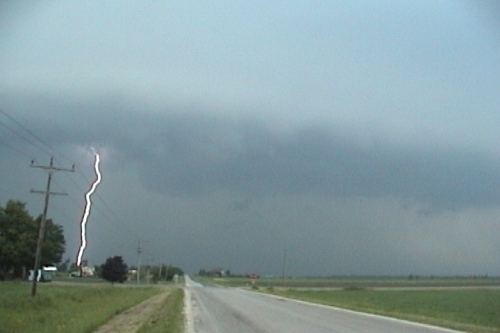
A summer squall line in Southern Ontario, producing lightning and distant heavy rains.

Wind shear is an important aspect to measuring the potential of squall line severity and duration. In low to medium shear environments, mature thunderstorms will contribute modest amounts of downdrafts, enough to turn will aid in create a leading edge lifting mechanism – the gust front. In high shear environments created by opposing low level jet winds and synoptic winds, updrafts and consequential downdrafts can be much more intense (common in supercell mesocyclones). The cold air outflow leaves the trailing area of the squall line to the mid-level jet, which aids in downdraft processes.

==== Evolution ====
===== Updrafts =====
The leading area of a squall line is composed primarily of multiple updrafts, or singular regions of an updraft, rising from ground level to the highest extensions of the troposphere, condensing water and building a dark, ominous cloud to one with a noticeable overshooting top and anvil (thanks to synoptic scale winds). Because of the chaotic nature of updrafts and downdrafts, pressure perturbations are important.

As thunderstorms fill into a distinct line, strong leading-edge updrafts – occasionally visible to a ground observer in the form of a shelf cloud – may appear as an ominous sign of potential severe weather.

Beyond the strong winds because of updraft/downdraft behavior, heavy rain (and hail) is another sign of a squall line. In the winter, squall lines can occur albeit less frequently – bringing heavy snow and/or thunder and lightning – usually over inland lakes (i.e. Great Lakes region).

===== Bow echoes =====
Following the initial passage of a squall line, light to moderate stratiform precipitation is also common. A bow echo is frequently seen on the northern and southernmost reaches of squall line thunderstorms (via satellite imagery). This is where the northern and southern ends curl backwards towards the middle portions of the squall line, making a "bow" shape. Bow echoes are frequently featured within supercell mesoscale systems.

===== Mesolow =====
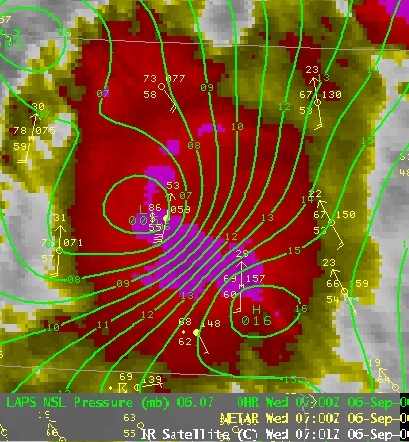
A wake low is a mesolow

The poleward end of the squall line is commonly referred to as the cyclonic end, with the equatorward side rotating anticyclonically. Because of the coriolis force, the poleward end may evolve further, creating a "comma shaped" mesolow, or may continue in a squall-like pattern.

A wake low is another kind of mesoscale low-pressure area to the rear of a squall line near the back edge of the stratiform rain area. Due to the subsiding warm air associated with the system's formation, clearing skies are associated with the wake low. Severe weather, in the form of high winds, can be generated by the wake low when the pressure difference between the mesohigh preceding it and the wake low is intense enough. When the squall line is in the process of decay, heat bursts can be generated near the wake low. Once new thunderstorm activity along the squall line concludes, the wake low associated with it weakens in tandem.

==== Dissipation ====
As supercells and multi-cell thunderstorms dissipate due to a weak shear force or poor lifting mechanisms, (e.g. considerable terrain or lack of daytime heating) the squall line or gust front associated with them may outrun the squall line itself and the synoptic scale area of low pressure may then infill, leading to a weakening of the cold front; essentially, the thunderstorm has exhausted its updrafts, becoming purely a downdraft dominated system. The areas of dissipating squall line thunderstorms may be regions of low CAPE, low humidity, insufficient wind shear, or poor synoptic dynamics (e.g. an upper-level low filling) leading to frontolysis.

From here, a general thinning of a squall line will occur: with winds decaying over time, outflow boundaries weakening updrafts substantially and clouds losing their thickness.

=== Signs in the sky ===
Shelf clouds and roll clouds are usually seen above the leading edge of a squall, also known as a thunderstorm's gust front. From the time these low cloud features appear in the sky, one can expect a sudden increase in the wind in less than 15 minutes.

== Tropical cyclones ==
Tropical cyclones normally have squalls coincident with spiral bands of greater curvature than many mid-latitude systems due to their smaller size. These squalls can harbor waterspouts and tornadoes due to the significant vertical wind shear which exists in the vicinity of a tropical cyclone's outer bands.

== Winter weather ==
Snow squalls can be spawned by an intrusion of cold air aloft over a relatively warm surface layer. Lake-effect snows can be in the form of a snow squall.

== See also ==
- Rogue wave
- Squall line
- White squall
