= Mesohigh =

A mesohigh (sometimes called a "bubble high") is a mesoscale high-pressure area that forms beneath thunderstorms. While not always the case, it is usually associated with a mesoscale convective system. In the early stages of research on the subject, the mesohigh was often referred to as a "thunderstorm high".

== Formation ==
A mesohigh forms underneath the downdraft in a squall line and is associated with the cold pool of a thunderstorm. It is largely formed by hydrostatic phenomenon, specifically the evaporation of falling precipitation. As precipitation, primarily rain, falls in the downdraft, it evaporates in the unsaturated air, leading to cooling in the downdraft due to an absorption of latent heat. The cooling of the air leads to an increase in the pressure as the air becomes denser. While not the primary mechanism behind the mesohigh, melting or sensible cooling of hail can also lead to increased pressure in the mesohigh.

An additional source of increased pressure is hydrometeor loading, the weight of precipitation increasing the speed of the downdraft, leading to increased pressure as the air converges at the surface. While hydrometeor loading is not a main contributor of increased pressure to the mesohigh, and it is a non-hydrostatic process, it can increase the pressure as much as 2 mb.

== See also ==
- Wake low
- Ted Fujita
