= Squall line =

Line of thunderstorms along or ahead of a cold front

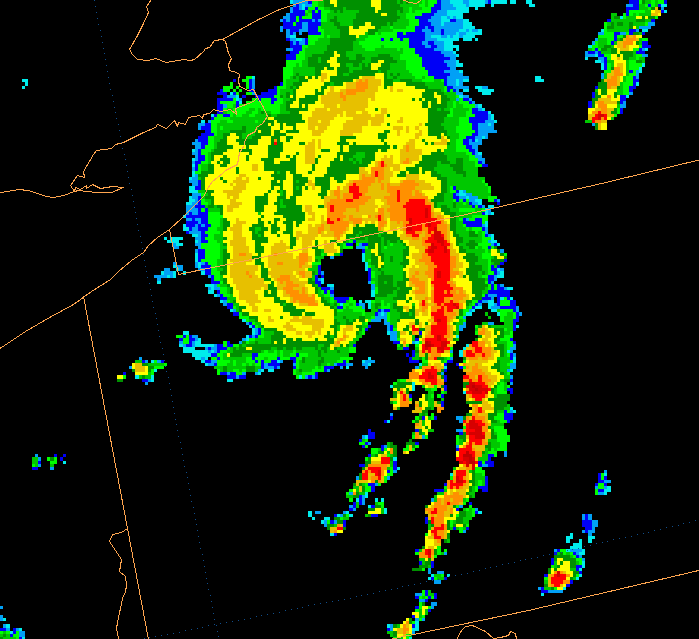
A weather radar image of a mesoscale convective vortex (MCV) over Pennsylvania with a leading squall line

A squall line, or quasi-linear convective system (QLCS), is a line of thunderstorms, often forming along or ahead of a cold front. In the early 20th century, the term was used as a synonym for cold front (which often are accompanied by abrupt and gusty wind shifts). Linear thunderstorm structures often contain heavy precipitation, hail, frequent lightning, strong straight-line winds, and occasionally tornadoes or waterspouts. Particularly strong straight-line winds can occur where the linear structure forms into the shape of a bow echo. Tornadoes can occur along waves within a line echo wave pattern (LEWP), where mesoscale low-pressure areas are present. Some bow echoes can grow to become derechos as they move swiftly across a large area. On the back edge of the rainband associated with mature squall lines, a wake low can be present, on very rare occasions associated with a heat burst.

== Theory ==
Polar front theory was developed by Jacob Bjerknes, derived from a dense network of observation sites in Scandinavia during World War I. This theory proposed that the main inflow into a cyclone was concentrated along two lines of convergence, one ahead of the low and another trailing behind the low. The trailing convergence zone was referred to as the squall line or cold front. Areas of clouds and rainfall appeared to be focused along this convergence zone. The concept of frontal zones led to the concept of air masses. The nature of the three-dimensional structure of the cyclone was conceptualized after the development of the upper air network during the 1940s.

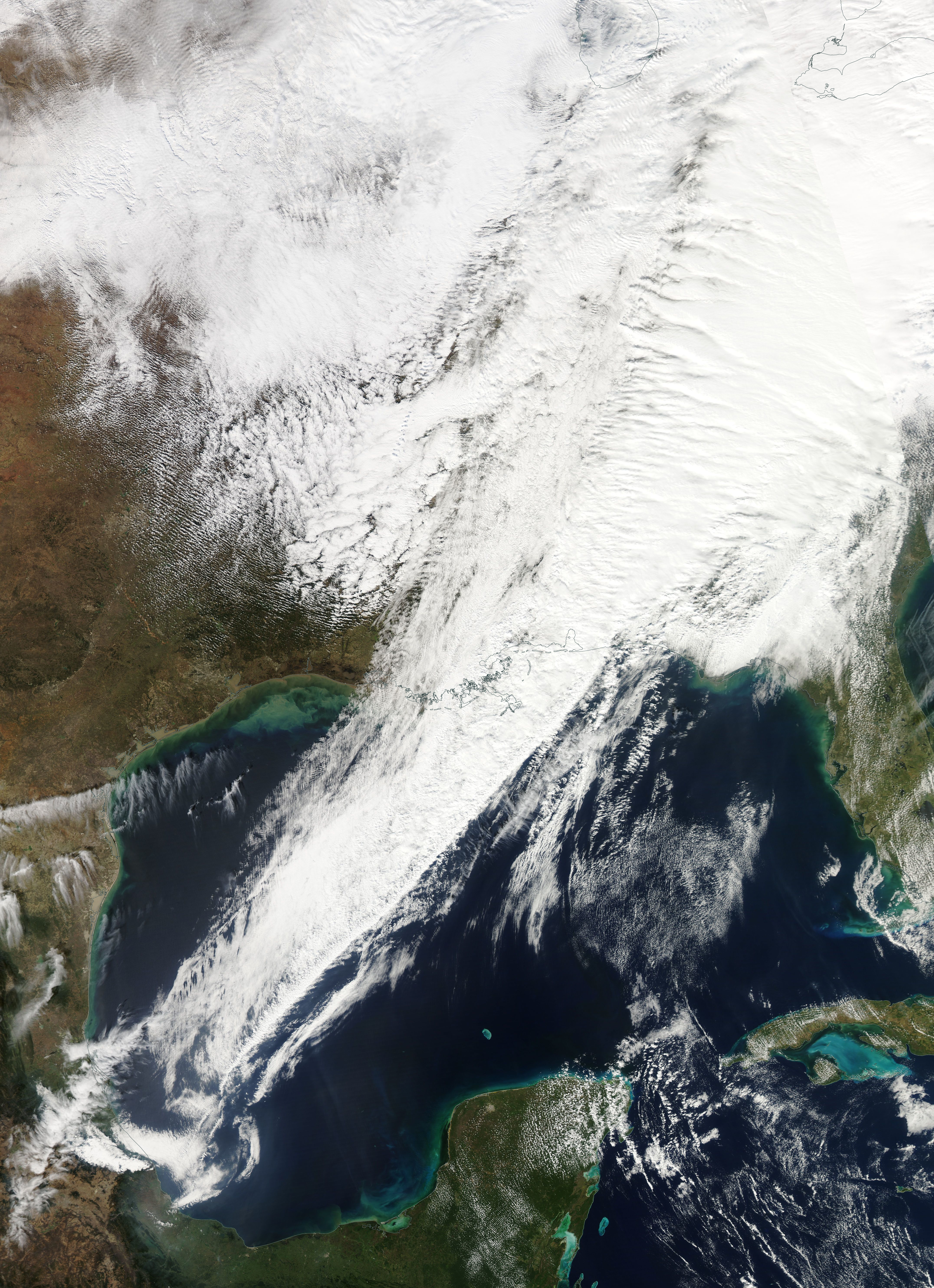
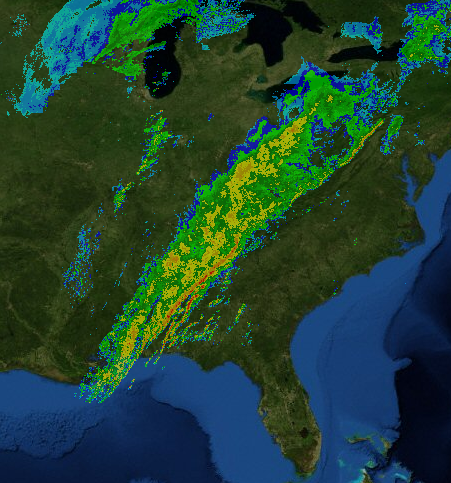
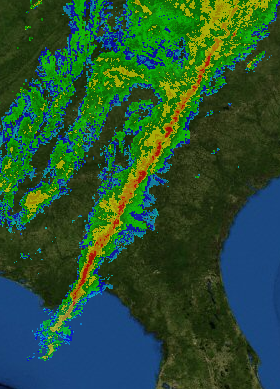
A squall line over 1,000 mi (1,600 km) long across the Gulf of Mexico and the Eastern U.S (radar coverage is from ground radars, so middle image does not cover the portion over the Gulf). The rightmost image is a couple of hours after the other two, showing the strongest portion of the line as it passes through Florida, Georgia, and South Carolina.

=== Life cycle ===
Typical evolution of (a) into a bow echo (b, c) and into a comma echo (d). Dashed line indicates axis of greatest potential for downbursts. Arrows indicate wind flow relative to the storm. Area C is most prone to supporting tornado development.

Organized areas of thunderstorm activity reinforce pre-existing frontal zones, and they can outrun cold fronts. This outrunning occurs within the westerlies in a pattern where the upper-level jet splits into two streams. The resultant mesoscale convective system (MCS) forms at the point of the upper level split in the wind pattern in the area of best low-level inflow.

The convection then moves east and toward the equator into the warm sector, parallel to low-level thickness lines. When the convection is strong linear or curved, the MCS is called a squall line, with the feature placed at the leading edge of the significant wind shift and pressure rise.

If squall lines form over arid regions, a dust storm known as a haboob may result from the high winds in their wake picking up dust from the desert floor. Well behind mature squall lines, a wake low can develop on the back edge of the rain shield, which can lead to a heat burst due to the warming up of the descending air mass which is no longer being rain-cooled. Smaller cumulus or stratocumulus clouds, along with cirrus, can be found ahead of the squall line.

As supercells and multi-cell thunderstorms dissipate due to a weak shear force or poor lifting mechanisms, (e.g. considerable terrain or lack of daytime heating) the gust front associated with them may outrun the squall line itself and the synoptic scale area of low pressure may then infill, leading to a weakening of the cold front; essentially, the thunderstorm has exhausted its updrafts, becoming purely a downdraft dominated system. The areas of dissipating squall line thunderstorms may be regions of low CAPE, low humidity, insufficient wind shear, or poor synoptic dynamics (e.g. an upper-level low filling) leading to frontolysis.

=== Characteristics ===
Cross-section of a squall line showing precipitation, airflow, and surface pressure

==== Updrafts ====
The leading area of a squall line is composed primarily of multiple updrafts, or singular regions of an updraft, rising from ground level to the highest extensions of the troposphere, condensing water and building a dark, ominous cloud to one with a noticeable overshooting top and anvil (thanks to synoptic scale winds). Because of the chaotic nature of updrafts and downdrafts, pressure perturbations are important. Precipitation-cooled air from downdrafts usually spreads outwardly just above the surface and lifts air into the updrafts unless gushing too far out and cutting off this inflow. Visually this process may take the form of a shelf cloud, often with a turbulent appearance.

==== Pressure perturbations ====
Pressure perturbations around thunderstorms are noteworthy. With buoyancy rapid within the lower and mid-levels of a mature thunderstorm, updraft and downdraft create distinct mesocenters of pressure. As thunderstorms organized in squall lines, the northern end of the squall line is commonly referred to as the cyclonic end, with the southern side rotating anticyclonically (in Northern hemisphere). Because of the Coriolis force, the northern end may evolve further, creating a "comma shaped" wake low, or may continue in a squall-like pattern. The updraft ahead of the line create a mesolow too while the downdraft just behind the line will produce a mesohigh.

==== Wind shear ====
Wind shear is an important aspect of a squall line. In low to medium shear environments, mature thunderstorms will contribute modest amounts of downdrafts, enough to help create a leading edge lifting mechanism – the gust front. In high shear environments created by opposing low level jet winds and synoptic winds, updrafts and consequential downdrafts can be much more intense (common in supercell mesocyclones). The cold air outflow leaves the trailing area of the squall line to the mid-level jet, which aids in downdraft processes.

=== Severe weather indicators ===
Severe squall lines typically bow out due to the formation of a stronger mesoscale high-pressure system (a mesohigh) within the convective area due to strong descending motion behind the squall line, and could come in the form of a downburst. The pressure difference between the mesoscale high and the lower pressures ahead of the squall line cause high winds, which are strongest where the line is most bowed out.

Another indication of the presence of severe weather along a squall line is its morphing into a line echo wave pattern (LEWP). A LEWP is a special configuration in a line of convective storms that indicates the presence of a low-pressure area and the possibility of damaging winds, large hail, and tornadoes. At each kink along the LEWP is a mesoscale low-pressure area, which could contain a tornado. In response to very strong outflow southwest of the mesoscale low, a portion of the line bulges outward forming a bow echo. Behind this bulge lies the mesoscale high-pressure area.

=== Depiction on maps ===
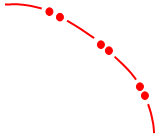
How a squall line is depicted by the NWS on weather maps

Squall lines are depicted on National Weather Service (NWS) surface analyses as an alternating pattern of two red dots and a dash labelled "SQLN" or "SQUALL LINE".

== Variations ==
=== Derecho ===
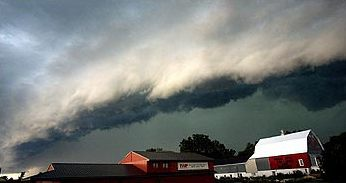
Shelf cloud on the leading edge of a derecho as photographed in Minnesota

A derecho (from Spanish: "derecho" meaning "straight") is a widespread and long-lived, violent convectively induced straight-line windstorm that is associated with a fast-moving band of severe thunderstorms usually taking the form of a bow echo. Derechos blow in the direction of movement of their associated storms, similar to a gust front, except that the wind is sustained and generally increases in strength behind the "gust" front. A warm weather phenomenon, derechos occur mostly in summer, between May and August in the Northern Hemisphere. They can occur at any time of the year and occur as frequently at night as in the daylight hours.

The traditional criteria that distinguish a derecho from a severe thunderstorm are sustained winds of 58 miles per hour (93 km/h) during the storm as opposed to gusts, high or rapidly increasing forward speed, and geographic extent (typically 250 nautical miles (500 km; 300 mi) in length.) In addition, they have a distinctive appearance on radar (bow echo); several unique features, such as the rear inflow notch and bookend vortex, and usually manifest two or more downbursts. Although these storms most commonly occur in North America, derechos occur elsewhere in the world. Outside North America they may be called by different names. For example, in Bangladesh and adjacent portions of India, a type of storm known as a "Nor'wester" may be a progressive derecho.

== See also ==
- Convective storm detection
- Mesoscale convective complex (MCC)
- Mesoscale convective vortex (MCV)
- Mesovortex
- Squall
