= Outflow (meteorology) =

Air that flows outwards from a storm system

Radar image animation of an outflow boundary of a storm approaching Tulsa, Oklahoma. The outflow boundary's weak echo moves left-to-right and passes overhead of the Doppler radar station. The outflow produces a gust front that moves ahead of the main thunderstorm.

Outflow, in meteorology, is air that flows outwards from a storm system. It is associated with ridging, or anticyclonic flow. In the low levels of the troposphere, outflow radiates from thunderstorms in the form of a wedge of rain-cooled air, which is visible as a thin rope-like cloud on weather satellite imagery or a fine line on weather radar imagery. For observers on the ground, a thunderstorm outflow boundary often approaches in otherwise clear skies as a low, thick cloud that brings with it a gust front.

Low-level outflow boundaries can disrupt the center of small tropical cyclones. However, outflow aloft is essential for the strengthening of a tropical cyclone. If this outflow is restricted or undercut, the tropical cyclone weakens. If two tropical cyclones are close, the upper-level outflow from the upwind system can limit the development of the other system.

== Thunderstorms ==
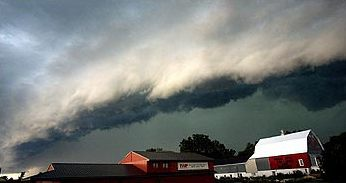
The outflow boundary indicated by the presence of this shelf cloud preceded a derecho in Minnesota

For thunderstorms, outflow tends to indicate the development of a system. Large quantities of outflow at the upper levels of a thunderstorm indicate its development. Too much outflow in the lower levels of a thunderstorm, however, can choke off the low-level inflow which fuels it. Squall lines typically bow out the most, or bend the most convex outward, at the leading edge of low level outflow due to the formation of a mesoscale high-pressure area which forms within the stratiform rain area behind the initial line. This high-pressure area is formed due to strong descending motion behind the squall line, and could come in the form of a downburst.

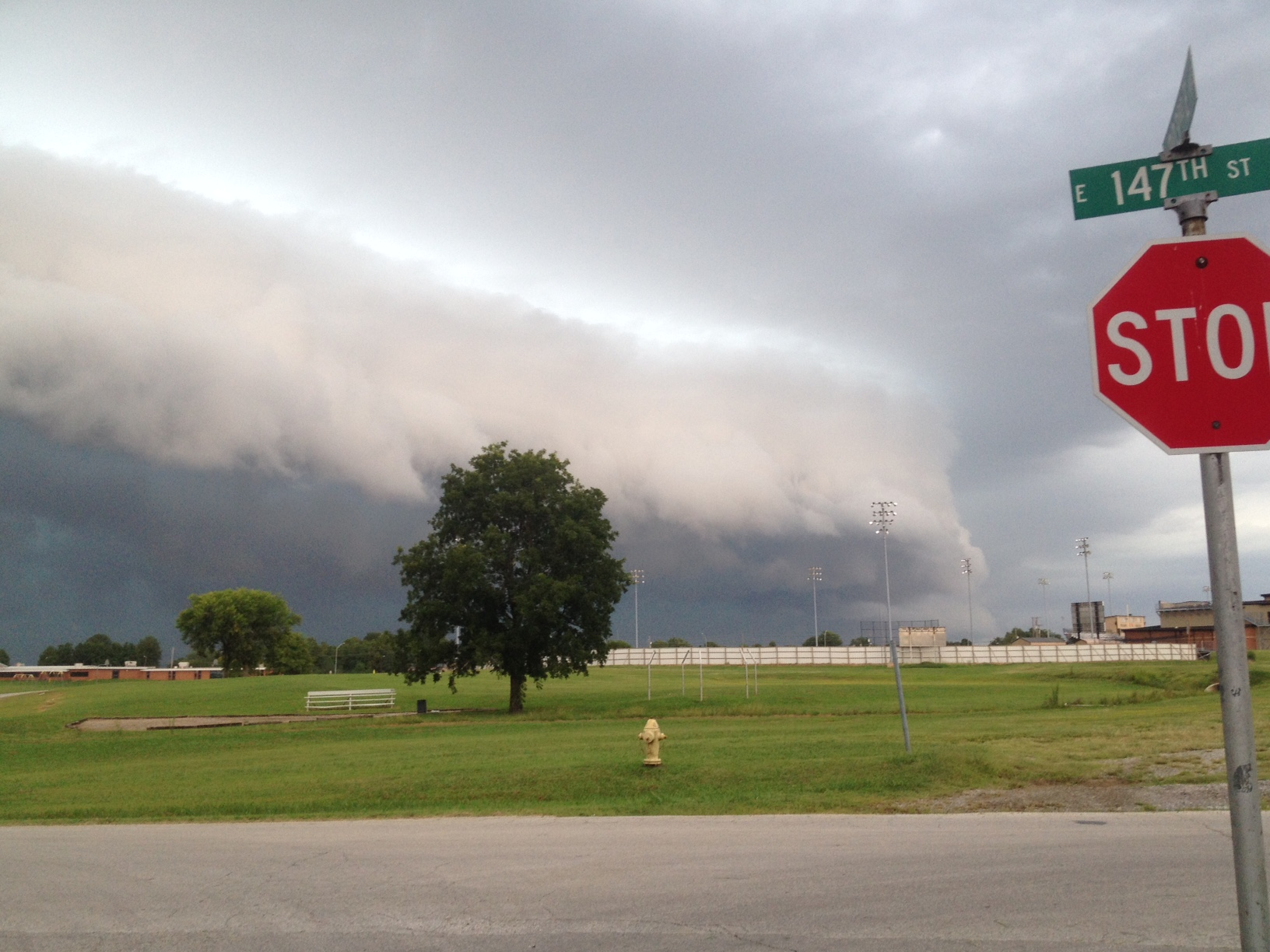
Outflow boundary that preceded a strong thunderstorm in Oklahoma

The "edge" of the outflow boundary can often be detected by Doppler radar (especially in clear air mode). Convergence occurs along the leading edge of the downdraft. Convergence of dust, aerosols, and bugs at the leading edge will lead to a higher clear air signature. Insects and arthropods are swept along by the prevailing winds, making them good indicators of the presence of outflow boundaries. The signature of the leading edge is also influenced by the density change between the cooler air from the downdraft and the warmer environmental air. This density boundary will increase the number of echo returns from the leading edge. Clouds and new thunderstorms also develop along the outflow's leading edge. This makes it possible to locate the outflow boundary when using precipitation mode on a weather radar. Also, it makes outflow boundaries findable within visible satellite imagery as a thin line of cumuliform clouds which is known as an arcus, or arc, cloud. The image to the right depicts a particularly strong outflow boundary ahead of a line of storms. Often, the outflow boundary will bow in the direction it is moving the quickest.

== Tropical cyclones ==
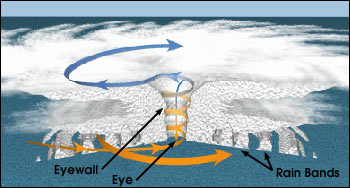
Structure of a tropical cyclone. The upper level outflow is depicted by cirrus clouds in the upper part of the schematic

The development of a significant mesoscale convective complex can send out a large enough outflow boundary to weaken the cyclone as the tropical cyclone center moves into the more stable air mass behind the leading edge of thunderstorm outflow, or outflow boundary. Moderate vertical wind shear can lead to the initial development of the convective complex and surface low similar to the mid-latitudes, but it must relax to allow tropical cyclogenesis to continue.

While the most obvious motion of clouds is toward the center, tropical cyclones also develop an upper-level (high-altitude) outward flow of clouds. These originate from air that has released its moisture and is expelled at high altitude through the "chimney" of the storm engine. This outflow produces high, thin cirrus clouds that spiral away from the center. The clouds are thin enough for the sun to be visible through them. These high cirrus clouds may be the first signs of an approaching tropical cyclone. As air parcels are lifted within the eye of the storm the vorticity is reduced, causing the outflow from a tropical cyclone to have anticyclonic motion. If two tropical cyclones are in proximity to one another, the outflow from the system downstream (normally to the west) can hinder the development of the system upstream (normally to the east).

== Local effects ==
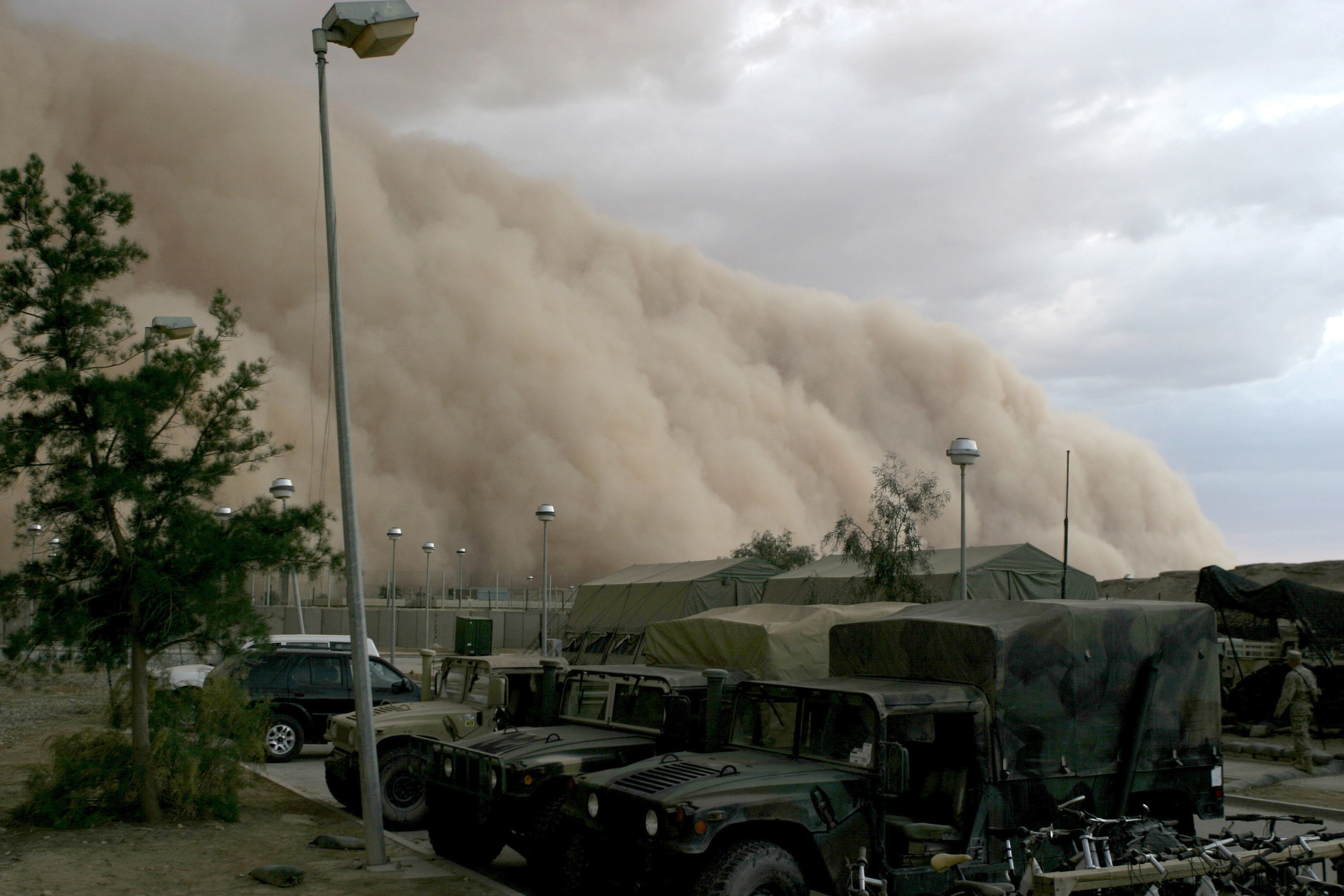
A sandstorm (Haboob) approaching Al Asad, Iraq, just before nightfall on April 27, 2005.

Low-level outflow boundaries from thunderstorms are cooler and more moist than the air mass the thunderstorm originally formed within due to its wet bulbing by rain, forming a wedge of denser air which spreads out from the base of the parent thunderstorm. If wind speeds are high enough, such as during microburst events, dust and sand can be carried into the troposphere, reducing visibility. This type of weather event is known as a haboob, and is most common in the late spring within Sudan. Upper-level outflow can consist of thick cirrus clouds which would then obscure the sun and reduce solar insolation around the outermost edge of tropical cyclones.
