= Hydrometeor loading =

Hydrometeor loading is the induced drag effects on the atmosphere from a falling hydrometeor. When falling at terminal velocity, the value of this drag is equal to gr_{h}, where g is the acceleration due to gravity and r_{h} is the mixing ratio of the hydrometeors. Hydrometeor loading has a net-negative effect on the atmospheric buoyancy equations. As the hydrometeor falls toward the surface, the surrounding air provides resistance against the acceleration due to gravity, and the air in the vicinity of the hydrometeor becomes denser. The increased weight of the atmosphere can support a present downdraft or even cause a downdraft to occur. Hydrometeor loading can also lead to increased high pressure inside of a mesohigh in a thunderstorm.
