= Arcus cloud =

Low-altitude horizontal cloud formation

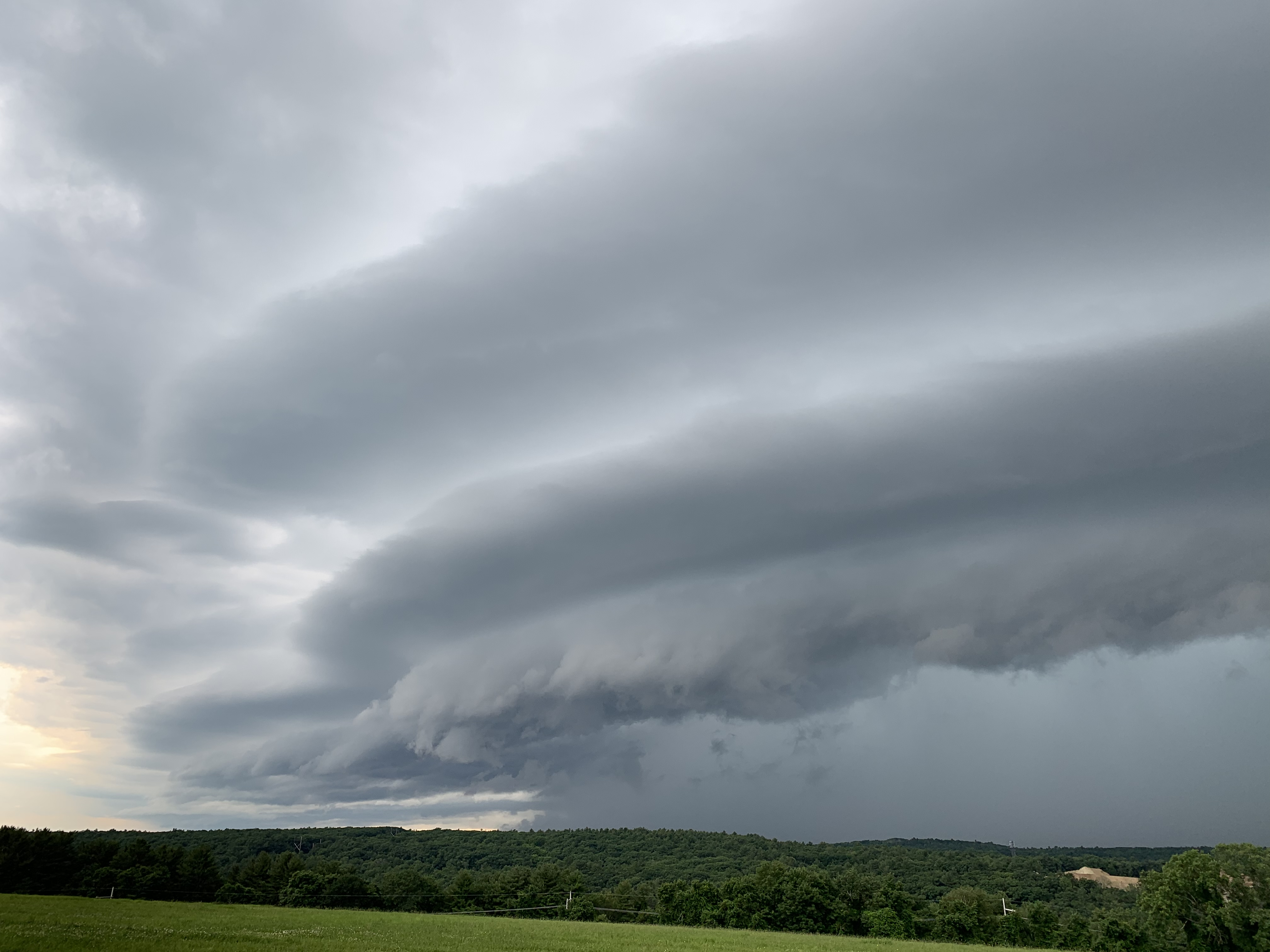
A striated shelf cloud, in Massachusetts in July 2022

An arcus cloud is a low, horizontal cloud formation, usually appearing as an accessory cloud to a cumulonimbus. Roll clouds and shelf clouds are the two main types of arcus clouds. They most frequently form along the leading edge or gust fronts of thunderstorms; some of the most dramatic arcus formations mark the gust fronts of derecho-producing convective systems. Roll clouds may also arise in the absence of thunderstorms, forming along the shallow cold air currents of some sea breeze boundaries and cold fronts.

== Types ==
=== Shelf cloud ===
A shelf cloud is a low, horizontal, wedge-shaped arcus cloud attached to the base of the parent cloud, which is usually a thunderstorm cumulonimbus, but could form on any type of convective clouds. Rising air motion can often be seen in the leading (outer) part of the shelf cloud, while the underside can often appear as turbulent and wind-torn. Cool, sinking air from a storm cloud's downdraft spreads out across the land surface, with the leading edge called a gust front. This outflow cuts under warm air being drawn into the storm's updraft. As the lower and cooler air lifts the warm moist air, its water condenses, creating a cloud which often rolls with the different winds above and below (wind shear).

People seeing a shelf cloud may believe they have seen a wall cloud. This is likely to be a mistake, since an approaching shelf cloud appears to form a wall made of cloud. Shelf clouds usually appear on the leading edge of a storm, while wall clouds are usually at the rear of the storm.

A sharp, strong gust front will cause the lowest part of the leading edge of a shelf cloud to be ragged and lined with rising fractus clouds. In a severe case there will be vortices along the edge, with twisting masses of scud that may reach to the ground or be accompanied by rising dust. A very low shelf cloud accompanied by these signs is the best indicator that a potentially violent wind squall is approaching. An extreme example of this phenomenon looks almost like a tornado and is known as a gustnado.

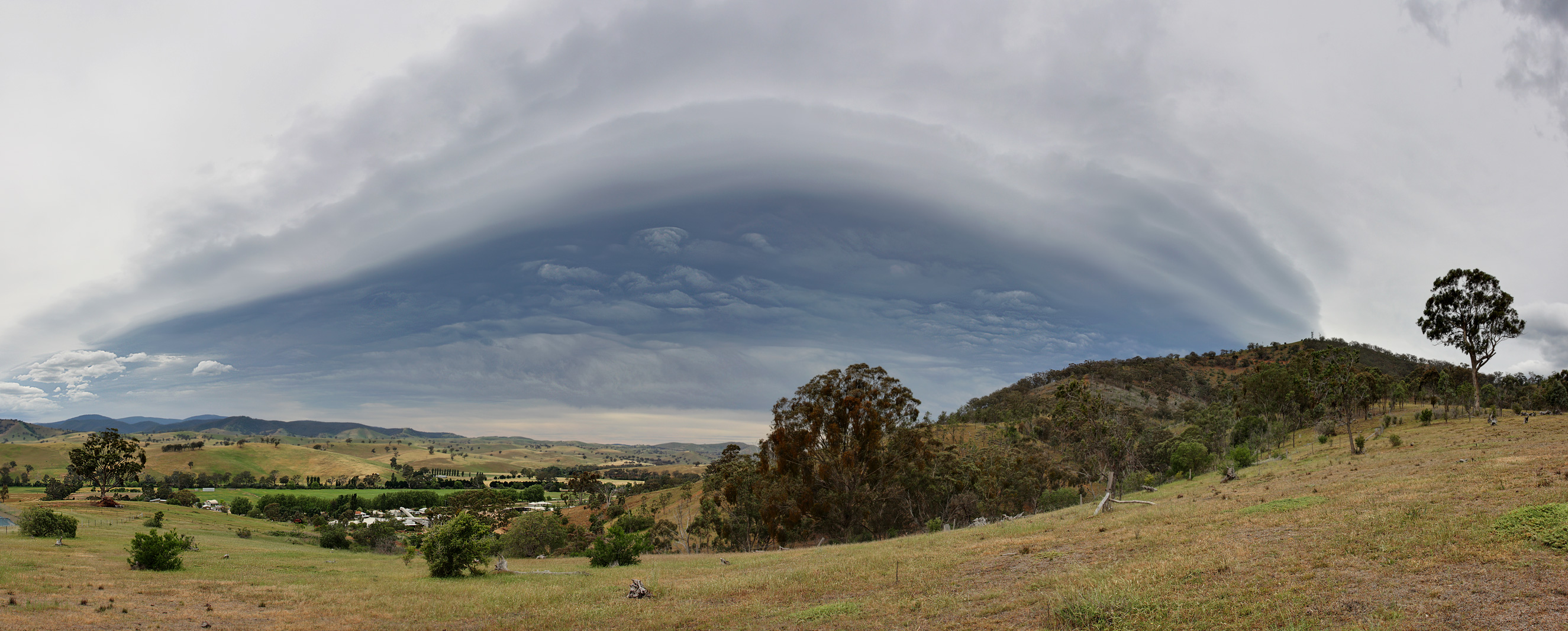
Underside of a weak shelf cloud

A time-lapse photography of shelf cloud just before a thunderstorm in Pondicherry, India

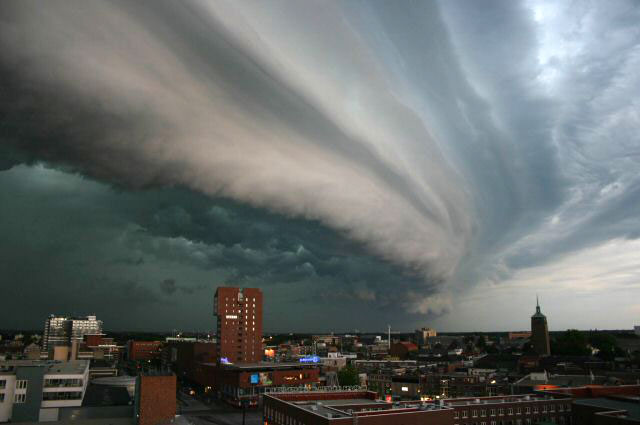
A shelf cloud over Enschede, Netherlands

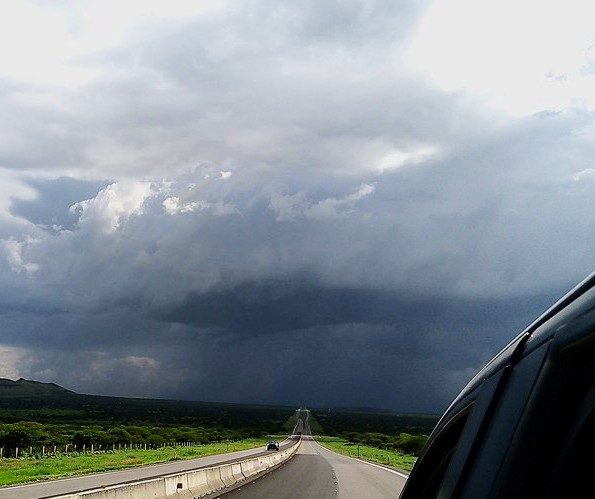
A shelf cloud in Durango, Mexico

=== Roll cloud ===
A roll cloud (Cloud Atlas name volutus) is a low, horizontal, tube-shaped, and relatively rare type of arcus cloud. They differ from shelf clouds by being completely detached from other cloud features. Roll clouds usually appear to be "rolling" about a horizontal axis. They are a solitary wave called a soliton, which is a wave that has a single crest and moves without changing speed or shape. This rolling is due to the variation in speed and direction of the winds with altitude (wind shear).

One of the most famous frequent occurrences is the Morning Glory cloud in Queensland, Australia, which can occur up to four out of ten days in October. One of the main causes of the Morning Glory cloud is the mesoscale circulation associated with sea breezes that develop over the Cape York Peninsula and the Gulf of Carpentaria. Such coastal roll clouds have been seen in many places, including California, the English Channel, Shetland Islands, the North Sea coast, coastal regions of Australia, and Nome, Alaska.

However, similar features can be created by downdrafts from thunderstorms or advancing cold front, and are not exclusively associated with coastal regions. They have been reported at different locations inland, including Kansas.

Roll clouds have not been associated with funnel clouds or tornadoes, as they are a horizontal vortex.

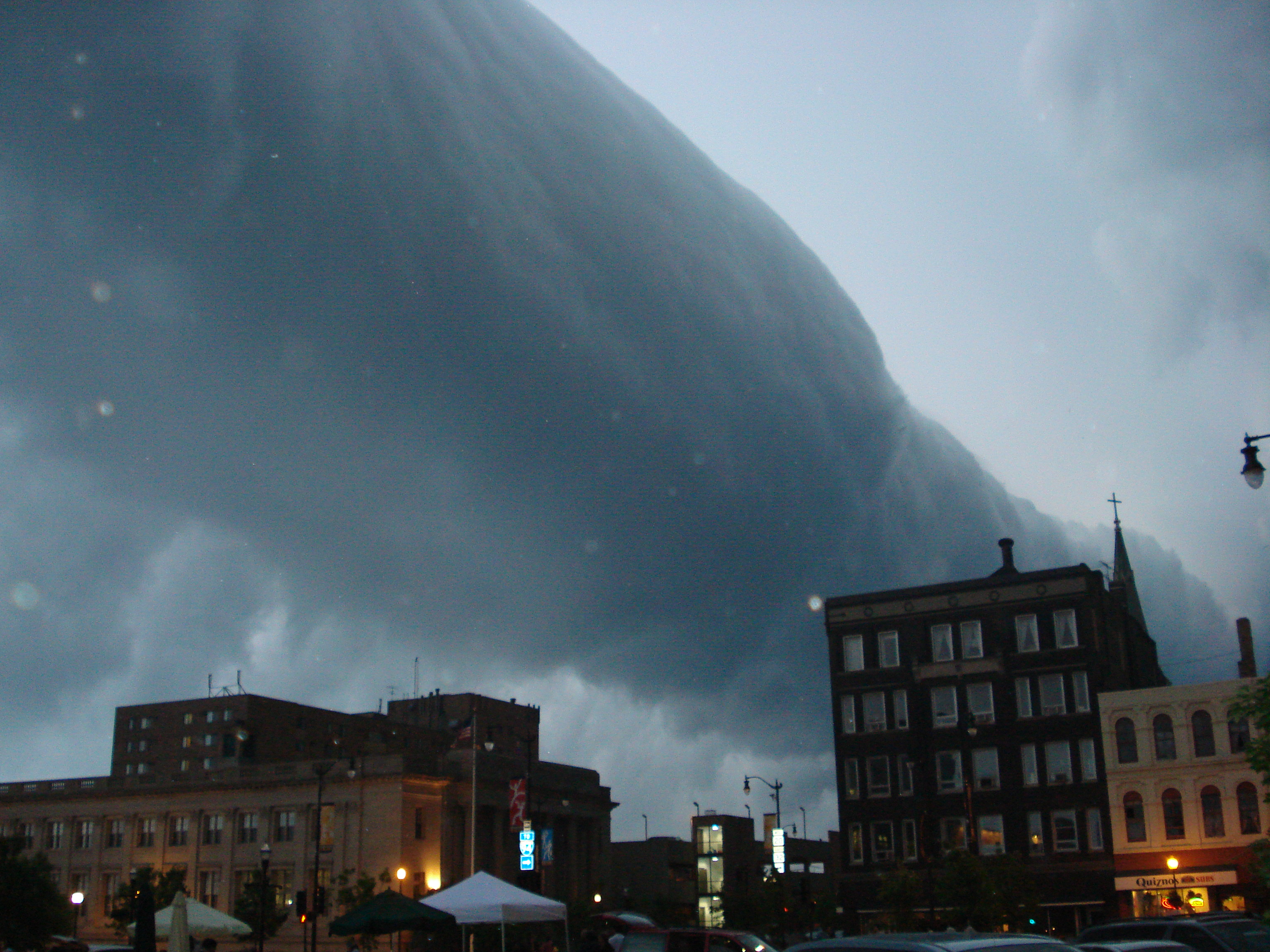
A roll cloud associated with a severe thunderstorm over Racine, Wisconsin, United States

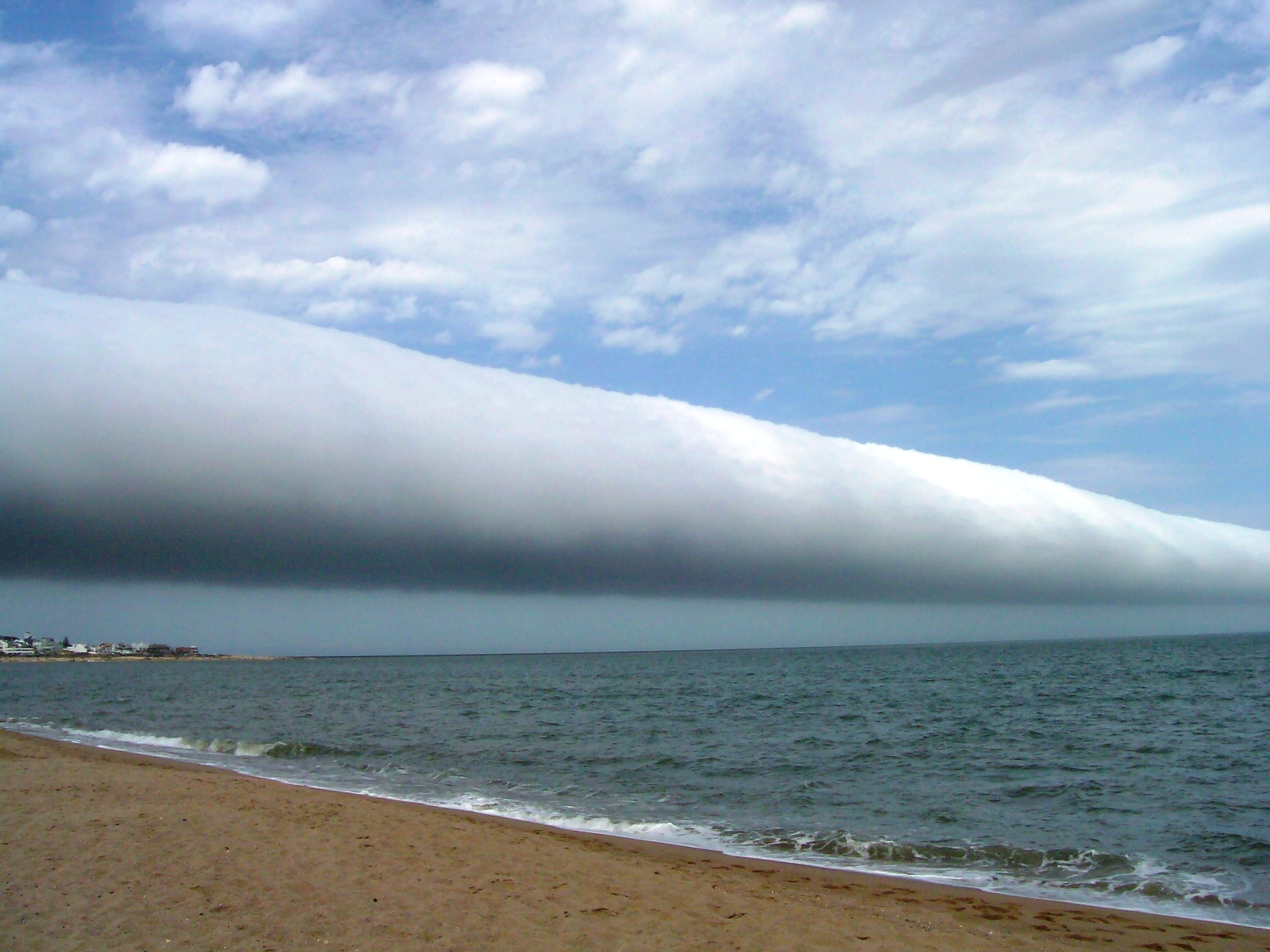
Coastal roll cloud in Punta del Este, Maldonado, Uruguay, a type known as Volutus

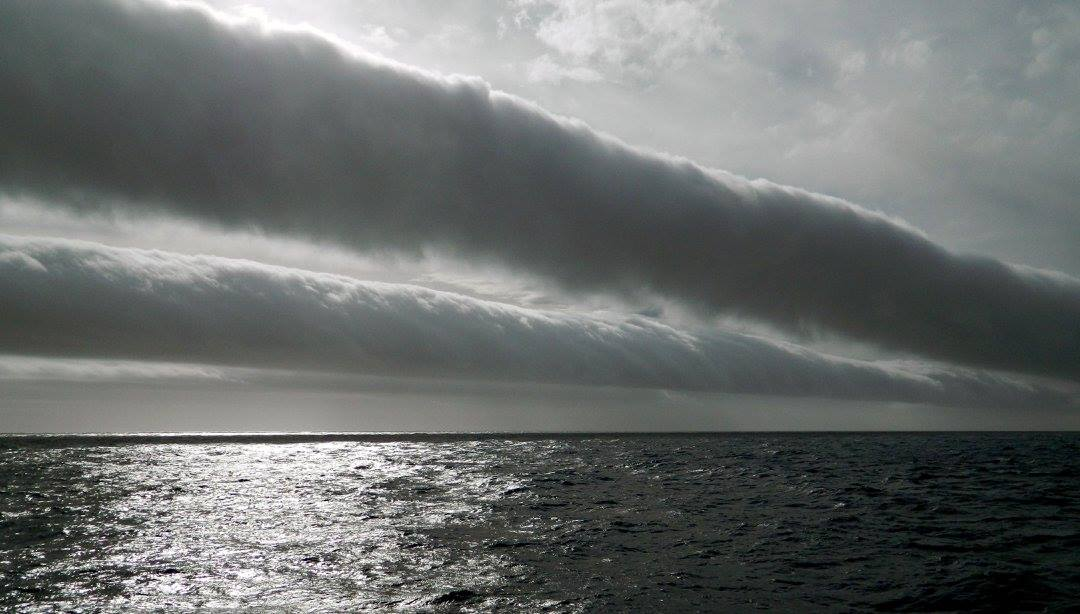
A sequence of volutus clouds at sea in the Drake Passage of the Southern Ocean

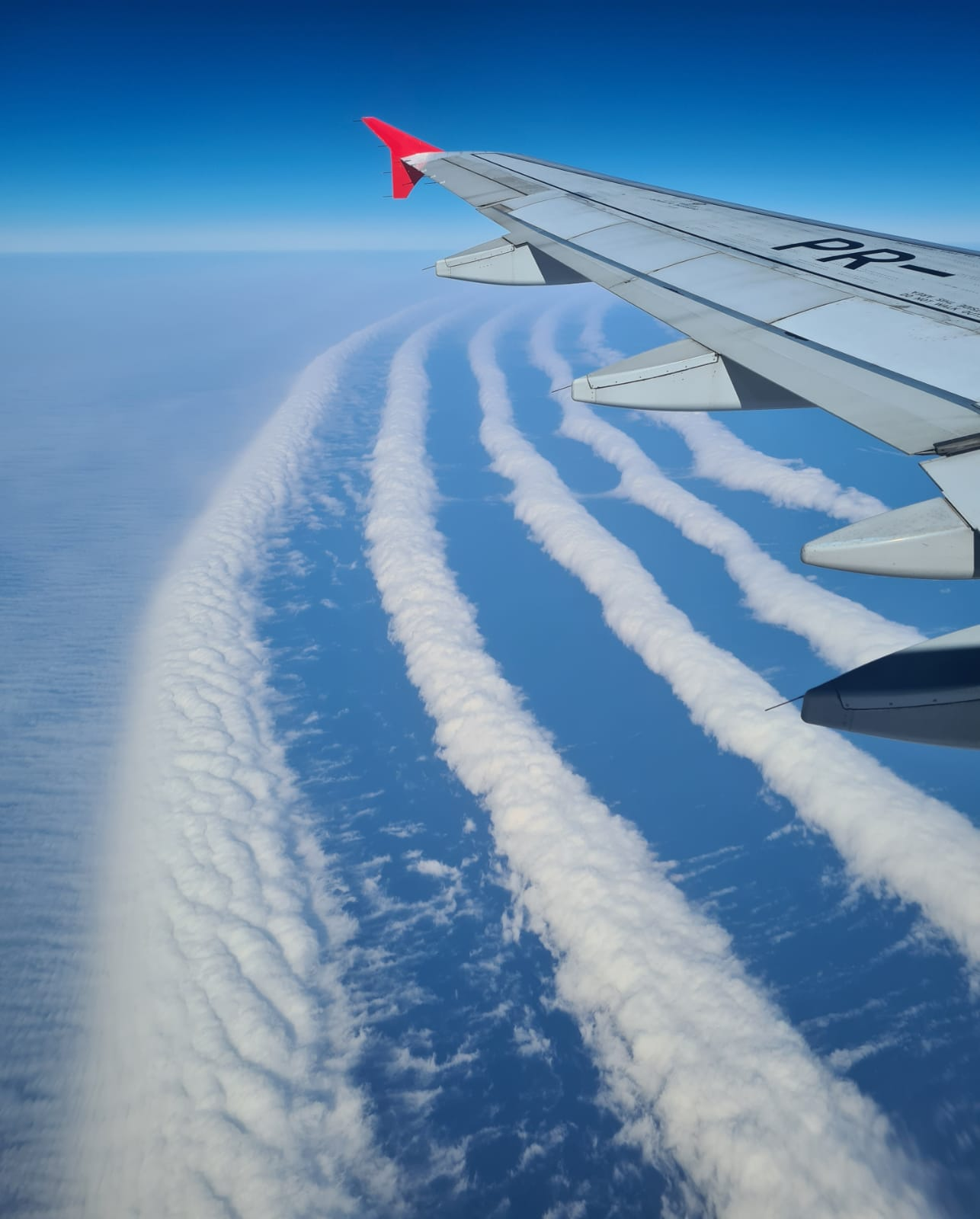
Roll clouds over southern Brazil

== See also ==
- Atmospheric convection
- Horizontal convective rolls (cloud streets)
- International Cloud Atlas
- World Meteorological Organization
