= Wake low =

Weather system

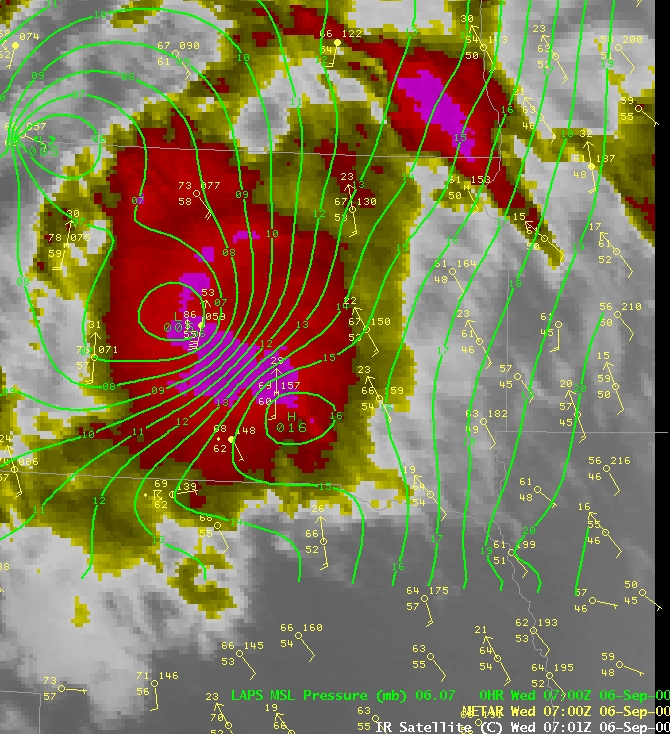
Image showing the pressure pattern around an organized thunderstorm complex. Near the strong wake low, strong winds and a temperature spike were recorded

A wake low, or wake depression, is a mesoscale low-pressure area which trails the mesoscale high following a squall line. Due to the subsiding warm air associated with the system's formation, clearing skies are associated with the wake low. Once difficult to detect in surface weather observations due to their broad spacing, the formation of mesoscale weather station networks, or mesonets, has increased their detection. Severe weather, in the form of high winds, can be generated by the wake low when the pressure difference between the mesohigh preceding it and the wake low is intense enough. When the squall line is in the process of decay, heat bursts can be generated near the wake low. Once new thunderstorm activity along the squall line concludes, the wake low associated with it weakens in tandem.

== Formation ==
Wake lows form due to adiabatic warming in the wake of mature squall lines at the back edge of their rain shields, where evaporative cooling is unable to offset warming due to atmospheric subsidence, or downward motion. They can be caused by gravity waves which duct through boundary layers which are deep and cold to the north of a weather front. As with mesoscale high-pressure areas behind a squall line, when new thunderstorm development stops along the squall line, the wake low will weaken as well. Clearing conditions will accompany the wake low, due to the descending warm air mass associated with the feature. Within the United States, these systems have been observed to form in the Mississippi River valley, Southeast, Florida, and Great Plains. A wake low producing strong northeasterly winds of 70 to 80 mph (110 to 130 km/h) and very rough seas was determined to be responsible for the capsizing of the Seacor Power lift boat (according to the National Weather Service) with 13 mariners drowned or missing.

== Detection ==
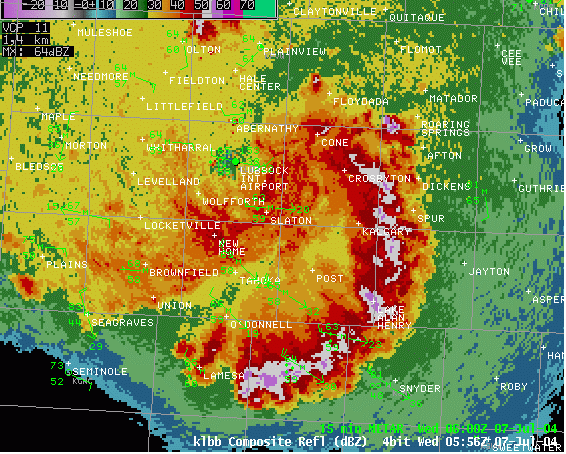
This radar image shows the location of a wake low wind event near Tahoka, Texas. Note the minimum in the radar returns in that area.

Both direct and indirect ways have been found to indicate the presence of a wake depression. The most direct is through the use of surface observations. Prior to the development of mesoscale weather station networks, or mesonets, it was difficult to locate wake lows. With the advent of mesoscale networks, wake lows have become easier to detect. On weather satellite and weather radar imagery, wake lows and heat bursts normally occur on the rear side of a precipitation area. However, within larger precipitation areas, they can be located within the area showing a minimum of returns. When using velocity data from a WSR-88D doppler radar, high winds on the back edge of reflectivity data can give away the location of a wake low.

== Association with heat bursts ==
Heat bursts are rare atmospheric phenomenon characterized by gusty winds and a rapid increase in temperature and decrease in dew point (moisture). Heat bursts typically occur during night-time and are associated with decaying thunderstorms. In association with wake lows, heat bursts are caused when rain evaporates (virga) into a parcel of cold dry air high in the atmosphere making the air denser than its surroundings. The parcel descends rapidly, warming due to compression, overshoots its equilibrium level and reaches the surface, similar to a downburst.

Recorded temperatures during heat bursts have reached well above 90 °F (32 °C), sometimes rising by 20 °F (11 °C) or more within only a few minutes. More extreme events have also been documented, where temperatures have been reported to exceed 130 °F (54 °C), although such extreme events have never been officially verified. Heat bursts are also characterized by extremely dry air and are sometimes associated with very strong, even damaging, winds.

== See also ==
- Mesoscale convective vortex (MCV)
