= List of derecho events =

The following is a list of derecho events.

== North America ==
Event	Date	Notes
First Named Derecho	July 31, 1877	The severe windstorm crossing Iowa that Prof. Gustavus Hinrichs identified as something special, and named the "derecho" for its straight (rather than spiraling) winds.
1965 Chicago Derecho	August 26–27, 1965	
Ohio Fireworks Derecho	July 4, 1969	
1977 Southern – Mid-Atlantic derecho	June 6, 1977	
Independence Day Derecho of 1977	July 4, 1977	This derecho was important in developing the understanding of what a derecho is. It was captured on radar and studied by Dr. Fujita in his efforts to better identify and formalize descriptions of weather events. It revealed a well-defined bow-shaped echo with edge vortices and was extremely long-lived compared to a tornado. Fujita used information from this storm to formalize terminology and identify radar echo attributes which could be used to identify past and future derechos. Using this information, Fujita analyzed radar signatures from previous windstorms to formally classify some of those as derechos.
More Trees Down Derecho	July 4–5, 1980	
Western Wisconsin Derecho	July 15, 1980	
Illinois/Michigan Derecho	July 16, 1980	
I-94 derecho	July 19, 1983	
1991 West Virginia derecho	April 9, 1991	
Southern Great Lakes Derecho of 1991	July 7–8, 1991	
Pakwash Forest Blowdown	July 18, 1991	Near Ear Falls, Ontario – 191,400 hectares of forest blown down, in a line some 40 km (25 miles) long. Post-damage survey estimated peak wind speeds of over 100 mph (160 km/h)
1993 Storm of the Century	March 12–13, 1993	Florida and Cuba; associated with very significant storm surge
June 4, 1993 Derecho	June 4, 1993	Midwestern US, Mid-Atlantic US – A fast moving derecho causes significant wind speeds and damage across its path.
July 1993 Central Plains derecho	July 8–9, 1993	
Utah Wyoming Derecho 1994	May 31, 1994	One of the few identified "Low Dew Point" Derecho events (i.e. one in relatively dry air) according to the National Weather Service. What started as a cluster of thunderstorms in southern Nevada rapidly intensified as they moved northeast into west central Utah. Eventually a powerful line of storms formed producing destructive winds across northern Utah, southwestern Wyoming, and small portions of southeastern Idaho, and northwestern Colorado. The system was unique as surface dew points across the impacted region were in the 40s F to low 50s F (≈4-12 C), much lower (drier) than the typical high 60s F to low 70s F (≈19-23 C), or higher, dew points typically seen during late spring-summer derecho events in the eastern US.
Heat wave of 1995 derecho series	July 11–15, 1995	Four derechos occurred over 4 consecutive nights. The first one formed the evening of July 11 in eastern Montana and dissipated the next morning over Minnesota. That evening a second derecho followed a nearly identical path before turning south over Michigan and dissipating over Ohio the evening of the 13th. That evening a derecho formed over central South Dakota and moved northeast before dissipating over northeast Minnesota that morning. The final derecho formed over northern Michigan and moved southeast over the Northeast dissipating over the Atlantic Ocean producing 100 mph (160 km/h) winds over Ontario and New York. 14 states were affected by these storms.
Late-May 1998 tornado outbreak and derecho	May 30–31, 1998	Formed out of a tornado outbreak over South Dakota that produced the F-4 Spencer tornado. The derecho swept across southern Minnesota and northern Iowa producing 80–100 mph (130–160 km/h) winds. It crossed into Wisconsin around 12 am CDT bringing widespread damage to almost the entire state with 100–128 mph (161–206 km/h) winds being reported from northern Madison to northern Milwaukee. It crossed into Michigan around 4:45 am EDT (causing a seiche over Lake Michigan) bringing 60–90 mph (97–145 km/h) winds to the entire state with the southern counties being hit with 120–130 mph (190–210 km/h) winds. The event caused the largest power outage recorded in the state's history. It crossed the state at a blistering 70 mph (110 km/h) and entered Ontario bringing 75 mph (121 km/h) winds. The line would dissipate over New York after 11 am EDT. Six people were killed in the derecho and more than two million people lost power. Some areas in Michigan didn't get power restored for ten days.
Corn Belt Derecho	June 29, 1998	
New York State Labor Day derechos	September 7, 1998	
Boundary Waters-Canadian Derecho	July 4–5, 1999	
People Chaser Derecho	May 27–28, 2001	Affected Kansas, Oklahoma, and Texas on the evening of May 27 into May 28. The strongest winds reached 100 mph (160 km/h) near Garden City, Kansas. One fatality and four injuries, alongside over 150,000 power outages in Oklahoma.
2001 Central Wisconsin derecho	June 11, 2001	AKA the "Oshkosh Derecho"
October 2001 Mississippi-Ohio Valleys derecho	October 24, 2001	
March 2002 Serial Derecho	March 8–10, 2002	Produced snow, sleet, freezing rain, rain, and hail.
Memphis Summer Storm of 2003	July 22, 2003	AKA "Hurricane Elvis"
Michigan Ohio Pennsylvania Derecho	May 21, 2004	
Mississippi – Tennessee Valley Derecho of 2004	July 13, 2004	A derecho formed out of the complex of thunderstorms that included the supercell that caused the Roanoke tornado in central Illinois. It swept southeast over southwest Indiana bringing winds of around 58 mph (93 km/h) to Evansville and much of the city was left without power. As it moved over Kentucky and Tennessee it expanded in size bringing damage to over half of both states with winds peaked at 84 mph (135 km/h) in Southern Kentucky. Louisville reported the most power outages since the 1974 Super Outbreak. 60 mph (97 km/h) winds were also reported in Lexington and a 70 mph (110 km/h) wind gust was reported in Elizabethtown. Hundreds of trees were reported down in Nashville with multiple reports of 60 mph wind gusts.
2005 Upper Midwest Derecho	July 23, 2005	A derecho formed in Northeastern South Dakota near Roslyn and traveled through Central Minnesota into West Central Wisconsin, and Central Wisconsin into Southern Wisconsin. The Derecho traveled more than 350 miles (560 km) and produced winds up to 85 mph (137 km/h) with hail up to Half Dollar Size.
Southern U.S. March Derecho	March 9, 2006	
April 2, 2006 Tornado Outbreak	April 2, 2006	
Heat wave of 2006 derecho series	July 17–19 and 21, 2006	
February 26, 2008, derecho	February 26, 2008	
June 4, 2008, derecho	June 4, 2008	
The Iowa Summer Derecho of 2008	July 21, 2008	
Chicago Derecho	August 4, 2008	
May 2009 derecho series	May 3–8, 2009	
May 2009 Southern Midwest derecho	May 8, 2009	AKA "The Inland Hurricane"
June 2009 Mid-South Derecho	June 12, 2009	
June 2009 Southern KY derecho	June 16, 2009	
June 2009 Midwest Derecho series	June 17–19, 2009	
June 18 Midwest derechos	June 18, 2010	A cluster of thunderstorms over Nebraska developed into a squall line over Iowa during the morning of June 18. This line swept eastward bringing 75 mph winds to Des Moines, Iowa and 60 mph winds to the Quad Cities. It continued across northern Illinois and extreme southern Wisconsin hitting Chicago at 1 pm bringing 70-80 mph winds to the city. The line continued into Michigan and Indiana dramatically growing in size, stretching from Danville, IL to Fort Wayne, IN to Lansing, MI. A 90 mph wind gust was recorded in La Porte, IN. Behind this line, a second squall line developed over northeast Iowa and traveled across the same areas as the first hitting the Quad Cities 6 hours after the first one and Chicago 5 hours after the first line. The first line began dissipating around 9pm EDT over Ohio while the second one would fall below severe limits. 2 people died in the first line while it is unclear if the second one met derecho criteria.
Late June 2010 Hybrid Derecho	June 23, 2010	
October 2010 North American storm complex	October 23–28, 2010	
April 2011 Serial Derecho and Tornado Outbreak	April 4–5, 2011	An extensive serial derecho moved through the entire southeast. The first line formed in Texas and swept northeastward through Arkansas and Northern Louisiana and continued through Kentucky, Tennessee and Northern Mississippi extending over 200 miles in length. As it continued east a new line (associated with the same system) formed over Louisiana and organized over Mississippi and Alabama. At one point the two lines stretched over 800 miles in length. The first line weakened over the Appalachian Mountains while the second one continued across Georgia and South Carolina and grew to also affect Virginia and North Carolina before moving offshore. 1096 wind reports came in, the most on record. 46 tornadoes also touched down.
April 2011 Ozarks Serial Derecho and Tornado Outbreak	April 19–20, 2011	A second large serial derecho affected areas of the Tennessee River Valley and Midwest. Wind gusts up to 95 mph were recorded. Large hail and 80 tornadoes also occurred with this event. This event would be overshadowed by major tornado outbreaks that occurred just before and after it.
July 2011 Upper Midwest-Great Lakes Derecho	July 10–11, 2011	A series of derecho-producing convective systems produced a relatively narrow but lengthy swath of wind damage that extended all the way from the central High Plains to the Mid-Atlantic states on July 10–11, 2011. A small powerful derecho first formed in Southern North Dakota producing winds up to 95 mph (153 km/h), hail up to hen egg sized and nine tornadoes including a large EF2 tornado SE of Napoleon which heavily damaged three farm houses. Two large grain bins were destroyed and thrown considerable distances. Many trees were uprooted or snapped. The derecho produced widespread wind gusts and wind damage reports from Southern North Dakota, Central Minnesota and Western Central Wisconsin. The derecho weakened considerably when the July 2011 Iowa-Illinois-Michigan-Ohio derecho sucked the instability and moisture from the storm over Lake Michigan. The derecho traveled more than 400 miles (640 km) and produced nine tornadoes in North Dakota and Western Minnesota.
July 2011 Iowa-Illinois-Michigan-Ohio derecho	July 11, 2011	
July 2011 Ontario-Quebec-Northern New England derecho	July 17, 2011	A fast moving progressive derecho moved into the Ottawa Valley, the province of Quebec and bordering areas of northern New York, Vermont, New Hampshire before dissipating over Maine. 3 people were injured after the stage collapsed at the Ottawa Bluesfest due to the straight line winds.
June 2012 Lower Mississippi Valley derecho	June 11, 2012	
Summer of 2012 derecho series	June 29, 2012-August 2012	Event on July 26 was the third derecho in 4 weeks to impact west-central Ohio
June 2012 North American derecho	June 29–30, 2012	AKA the "Ring of Fire Derecho", passed through nine states from Indiana to New Jersey, cutting power to millions
June 12–13, 2013 derecho series	June 12–13, 2013	Two derechos developed; one on June 12 and another on June 13.
Late June 2013 Chicago derecho	June 24, 2013	One person was killed by EF1 tornado near Muscatine, Iowa. Four other tornadoes were also confirmed during this event.
Late June 2014 Derechos	June 30-July 1, 2014	Also known as the "'One-Two Punch' Derechos", The first derecho began consolidating over Nebraska and swept eastward over Central Iowa where it organized into a small line of storms bringing winds up to 90 mph in the state. It weakened as it crossed into Illinois with the bulk of the 60-70 mph winds occurring in Wisconsin, though the line did restrengthen over Chicago. A second derecho formed right behind the first one and again brought damaging winds across Northern Illinois. It hit Chicago just 3 hours after the first one bringing 80 mph winds. It continued into Northern Indiana bringing 100 mph winds to Lake County before it began to weaken. It dissipated over Ohio at 4 am EDT. Two people were killed in the second derecho.
June 21–22, 2015 Severe Weather Event	June 21–22, 2015	Winds of 122 mph (196 km/h) recorded on personal weather station near Hayes, South Dakota before it was destroyed.
2015 Midwest Derecho	July 12–13, 2015	A powerful derecho first formed in a cluster in Todd and Douglas Counties in Minnesota and then spread to the east and southeast. A barn was one of the first victims south of Aldrich in Todd County. Next there were reports of trees down in Douglas County. There was also tree damage in Pope and Stearns Counties. Some of the most extensive damage occurred in the Brainerd and Baxter area of Crow Wing County where a National Weather Service survey showed winds in excess of 100 mph (160 km/h) did extensive damage to large, healthy trees, homes, power lines and businesses. Many trees and power lines were down the Baxter area, blocking roads including Highway 371. Two camper trailers were flipped and the Brainerd International Raceway grandstand was damaged. The Gull Lake Dam Campsite was evacuated of campers and then closed with hundreds of trees down in and around the campground. There was also extensive damage on Pelican Lake in Crow Wing County with many trees down and structural damage to resorts and cabins. As the storms sagged south into the Twin Cities Metro Area, heavy rain and lightning were the biggest impacts with 1–2 inches (2.5–5.1 cm) of rain common. 1.7 inches (4.3 cm) of rain fell in an hour at the U of M St. Paul Campus Climate Observatory. A location near Woodbury in Washington County saw 2.41 inches (6.1 cm) of rain. The highest 24-hour rainfall total found so far was 3.25 inches (8.3 cm) near Fergus Falls in Otter Tail County. Lighting sparked house fires in several locations around the Twin Cities. Severe storms merged in west central and central Minnesota and then developed more into a line of storms and produced periodic downed trees, power lines, and occasional estimated winds of 60–70 mph (97–113 km/h) as the storms moved southeast along Interstate 94 and into the Twin Cities metro area. Damage was not as widespread after it moved out of central Minnesota and into east central Minnesota, due to less wind shear and instability. The storms re-intensified as they moved into Wisconsin and continued to move southeast. By late afternoon on the 13th the line of storms were progressing through eastern Kentucky. The derecho traveled more than 900 miles (1,400 km) with winds gusting up to 104 mph (167 km/h).
August 2015 Northwest Michigan Derecho	August 2, 2015	Derecho over northwestern Lower Michigan, causing damage to trees at the Sleeping Bear Dunes National Lakeshore and cutting off power to many residents of Traverse City; also impacting the penultimate night of the Traverse City Film Festival, winds of 100 mph (160 km/h) occurred around Sleeping Bear Dunes and Glen Arbor, the largest hailstone in Northern Michigan occurred near West Branch, measured at 4.25 inches (10.8 cm).
June 2016 Ohio Valley Derecho	June 22–23, 2016	A powerful derecho produced just over 120 reports of either high thunderstorm winds or wind damage were reported to NOAA's Storm Prediction Center from midday Wednesday through early Thursday morning from northern Illinois to Virginia, including a 100 mph (160 km/h) wind gust apparently measured northwest of Battle Ground, Indiana. The temporal and spatial distribution of those wind reports qualified the event as a low-end derecho, according to the criteria used in a 2005 study.
2016 Upper Midwest Derecho	July 20–21, 2016	A massive intense derecho formed in central North Dakota during the afternoon of July 20 and moved into northwest Minnesota at dusk. A wind gust of 83 mph (134 km/h) was clocked at the Hallock Airport in Kittson County at 9:34 pm. The storms continued to move to the east and southeast causing damage as they went, including flipping over planes at the Bemidji Airport and peeling off roofs on steel-clad buildings in town. At 1 am on July 21 the storms reached Park Rapids in Hubbard County and downed trees. A wind gust was measured at 55 mph (89 km/h) at the Park Rapids Airport. By 3 am the storms moved into the Duluth area, where the ground was saturated from previous storms, making it even easier for the strong winds to topple large trees. Widespread power outages resulted, and at least 75,000 Minnesota Power customers lost service. The storms also moved through the Boundary Waters Canoe Area Wilderness, tragically killing two campers on Basswood Lake in Quetico, just across the Minnesota border in Ontario. The southern edge of the storms also moved through Central Minnesota and the Twin Cities metro area between 3:30 and 5:00 am, with gusty winds up to 70 mph (110 km/h) out ahead of the storms waking people out of bed and causing minor tree damage along with spotty power outages. Winds were measured at 100 mph (160 km/h) in downtown Duluth and measured at 103 mph (166 km/h) in the ship canal by a 700-foot (210 m) freighter.
May 2017 United States Derecho	May 26–28, 2017	Three derechos in a row struck the Ozarks, Ohio, and Tennessee valleys
June 2017 Northern Plains Derecho	June 11, 2017	During the morning hours of June 11, 2017, a dangerous derecho tracked eastward out of South Dakota, across Southern and Central Minnesota, and through Northern Wisconsin into the Upper Peninsula of Michigan. The derecho produced widespread wind gusts, large hail, and a tornado. Winds gusts up to 80 mph (130 km/h) were reported in Meeker County, Minnesota with hail up to hen egg size.
July 2017 Midwestern derecho	July 19–21, 2017	
2018 Mid-Atlantic Derecho	May 14, 2018	A derecho traveled over 400 miles (640 km) from Columbus, Ohio to the east coast of Virginia, causing severe thunderstorms, flash flooding, and hailstones the size of ping pong balls.
2018 Northeast Derecho	May 15, 2018	A derecho originating in Eastern Ohio traveled over 450 miles (720 km), terminating on the East Coast. This storm system caused damage from as far north as New York and Connecticut, to as far south as Maryland, killing five people and causing extensive damage. Ahead of the derecho, several supercells formed in, and travelled through the Northeastern Tri State Area, as well as Southern New England, producing hail up to the size of baseballs as well as multiple tornadoes, including an EF2 tornado. The derecho was notable for several reasons, as it was the first to hit the New York metropolitan area in several years, and it dropped large, life-threatening hail in areas that normally never saw hail at all.
2018 Southeastern Derecho	June 28, 2018	Formed in central Tennessee, traveled through the entire state of Alabama to the Gulf coast. One person was killed in Clay County, Alabama by a falling tree. Widespread power outages were reported all across Alabama.
2018 Northern Plains Derecho	June 28, 2018	Supercells formed in eastern Montana, producing several tornadoes before rapidly congealing into a derecho producing squall line. The derecho produced widespread wind damage across North Dakota and Western Minnesota. Winds up to 96 mph (154 km/h) were reported with this storm. A man was killed by a fallen tree.
2018 Midwest-Mississippi River Derecho	June 28, 2018	A derecho producing squall line formed in Eastern Nebraska. The complex of storms moved east across Iowa before turning southeast and moving south along the Mississippi River. Along its path it produced wind damage with gusts up to 85 mph (137 km/h).
Table Rock Lake Derecho	July 19, 2018	A derecho producing squall line formed in Kansas moving east then turning southeast into Missouri. Many wind gusts in excess of 75 mph (121 km/h) were reported in Kansas. As the derecho went through Missouri, it created dangerous marine conditions in Table Rock Lake. A duck boat capsized in the lake partly due to these conditions killing 17 of the 31 people on board.
July 2019 Heatwave Upper Midwest Derecho	July 19–20, 2019	A powerful derecho storm moved through the Upper Midwest on the Friday night of July 19, gathering up 73 damaging wind reports, according to the National Weather Service, and the same area remained under threat of more severe weather Saturday, July 20 for northern Iowa, southern Minnesota, Wisconsin and Michigan. Its believed that this storm dissipated before it reached the eastern Great Lakes Region including southern Ontario in Canada and the northeastern United States around July 21. Friday's event resulted in only the sixth known watch (Tornado or Severe Thunderstorm) with Wind Gust potential of up to 105 mph (169 km/h).
2020 Southern Plains-Ozarks Serial Derecho	April 28–29, 2020	A derecho brought damaging winds to parts of the central U.S. Tuesday night. Near Jasper, Missouri, a semi truck was overturned on Interstate 49 early Tuesday evening because of damaging thunderstorm winds from this squall line. A 75 mph (121 km/h) wind gust was estimated in the area of the incident. Tulsa, Oklahoma, reported estimated wind gusts of 65–75 mph (105–121 km/h) when the squall line of thunderstorms impacted that area early Tuesday evening. A wind gust to 64 mph (103 km/h) was clocked at Springfield–Branson National Airport in southwestern Missouri early Tuesday evening. Some 70 miles (110 km) to the west in Joplin, Missouri, and its suburbs, there were reports of trees and power lines down. The storms also produced hail up to the size of tennis balls – 2.5 inches (6.4 cm) in diameter – near Marshall, Mustang, Ninnekah and Yukon, Oklahoma. This storm system produced more than 450 reports of severe weather in the 24 hours ending early Wednesday morning from Illinois, Missouri and southeastern Kansas to parts of Texas and Louisiana. Most of those reports were for wind damage, strong thunderstorm winds or large hail. The derecho traveled more than 500 miles (800 km) before moving off the coast of Texas and Louisiana into the Gulf of Mexico and produced winds up to 78 mph (126 km/h) with hail up to 3.75 inches (9.5 cm) in diameter and a few tornadoes including a short-lived EF2 tornado north of Hochatown, Oklahoma that tossed two barges over 100 yd (91 m), a home's roof deck was collapsed, and a single-wide manufactured home was destroyed, with its base frame twisted and tossed 100 yd (91 m) to the east. A second house suffered significant roof and structural damage after large gas tanks were tossed into it. A third house had roofing material removed. Numerous trees were snapped or uprooted.
Kansas-Tennessee Progressive Derecho	May 3, 2020	Second derecho in a week, originating from the same spot. Hit Nashville, Tennessee just 2 months after a tornado devastated part of the city. 130,000 people lost power, making it the largest power outage in the cities history. It was said to be the worst derecho in 16 years.
June 2020 Pennsylvania–New Jersey derecho	June 3, 2020	Three deaths were reported in Montgomery County, Pennsylvania and a 93 mph (150 km/h) wind gust was recorded in Beach Haven, New Jersey. 700,000 were left without power.
June 2020 Rocky Mountains-Northern Plains Derecho	June 6–7, 2020	This derecho originated over eastern Utah and western Colorado in the late morning of June 6 and crossed the Rockies on to the High Plains before falling below severe limits in eastern North Dakota. A 110 mph (180 km/h) wind gust was recorded at the Winter Park Ski Resort in Colorado. Tree damage was reported throughout metro Denver and wind gusts were clocked at over 75 mph (121 km/h) at several locations in Jefferson, Adams, Douglas, and Denver Counties. Winds in excess of 75 mph (121 km/h) were also recorded in portions of Wyoming, South Dakota, and Nebraska. This derecho was unusual for its origin west of the Continental Divide and the extreme forward speed in its early stages, reaching 120 mph (190 km/h) at some points in western Colorado.
Great Lakes serial derecho of June 2020	June 10, 2020	A widespread thunderstorm wind event known as a squall line formed from a slowly progressing cold front, that was possibly associated with the remnants of Tropical Storm Cristobal. The squall line, later classified as a derecho, blasted the eastern Midwestern United States and Eastern Canada. A rare moderate risk of severe weather was issued for a large part of Michigan and parts of Ohio and Indiana; these regions had not had a moderate risk of severe weather since 2013. With a 5% chance for a tornado 45% hatched chance for damaging winds and 15% chance for damaging hail. Roughly 300 reports of high winds or wind damage were received from Michigan to western New York leaving 700,000 people without power. The storm system produced 7 tornadoes in the Canadian province of Ontario.
August 2020 Midwest derecho	August 10–11, 2020	AKA the "Heartland Derecho", A severe weather event which took place from August 10–11, 2020 across the Midwestern United States and portions of southwestern Ontario. The derecho caused notably high wind speeds of up to 126 mph (203 km/h) recorded in Iowa, with post-damage assessments of up to 140 mph (230 km/h) in some places. The derecho also spawned an outbreak of weak tornadoes, and resulted in an estimated $11 billion of damage. In addition, certain areas reported torrential rain and large hail.
October 2020 Northeast Serial Derecho	October 7, 2020	This serial derecho on Wednesday, October 7, 2020, caused a 320-mile (510 km) wide damage path in Ontario, New York, Massachusetts, and Connecticut. It formed over Ontario in the morning and raced eastward in New York State in the late afternoon and early evening, gathering strength as it moved across New York and southern New England. Isolated areas received gusts up to 75 mph (121 km/h), causing hundreds of thousands of people to have power outages, as well as tree and power line damage. Microbursts occurred in Root, Pittstown, and Johnsonville, New York, with estimated maximum wind speeds of 80, 90, and 100 mph (130, 140, and 160 km/h), respectively. An EF0 tornado touched down in Canajoharie, New York. An isolated brief EF0 tornado also touched down in Millis, Massachusetts with winds of 75–80 mph (121–129 km/h), only damaging trees and taking down a metal lamp post.
December 2021 Midwest derecho and tornado outbreak	December 15, 2021	A rare high end serial derecho event struck areas of the Midwest, including Kansas, Nebraska, Iowa, Wisconsin, and Minnesota. Lincoln Airport in Lincoln, Nebraska, with peak winds measured >93 mph (150 km/h). Several power outages were also reported, 200,000 of which were in the state of Kansas. This derecho also produced 120 tornadoes, including 33 rated EF2, making this the largest tornado outbreak ever recorded in December just days after another large outbreak set the record. This also was 4th most tornadoes ever recorded in a 24-hour period in the United States. The same system also produced intense non-thunderstorm winds on the back side of it, which spurred the formation of rapidly-moving fires across Colorado and western Kansas, with attendant dust and debris spreading eastward as well as heavy rain and snowfall to the Western United States.
May 2022 Midwest derecho	May 12, 2022	Large amounts of atmospheric instability contributed to a fast-moving and deadly derecho that traveled over 500 miles (800 km) across Kansas, Nebraska, Iowa, South Dakota, and Minnesota with wind gusts up to 107 mph (172 km/h). A powerful serial derecho first started in Central Nebraska, before moving rapidly into South Dakota, where most of the damage occurred, two deaths occurred in Minnehaha County, both were in their cars and were hit by flying debris. Many towns in South Dakota saw significant damage, some of the hardest hit being Salem and Madison. In Marion, several rail cars were tipped over by the extreme winds. In the aftermath, the governor of South Dakota deployed the National Guard in the hardest hit towns to assist with cleanup efforts. A person was injured in a truck rollover in Holt County, Nebraska. In Blomkest, Minnesota, a man was killed when a grain bin collapsed onto his car. Several farms in Western Minnesota and Eastern South Dakota had outbuildings, equipment, silos, grain bins, and barns damaged or destroyed. A moderate risk was issued with a 45% significant severe wind probability at 7:53 am CST.
May 2022 Canadian derecho	May 21, 2022	A fast-moving, intense derecho formed in the morning hours in St. Clair County, Michigan near Sarnia, Ontario, progressing through the London, Toronto, Ottawa, Montreal, and Quebec City metropolitan areas, killing at least ten people and causing extensive damage and power outages affecting an estimated 480,000 people. Wind gusts of over 75 mph (120 km/h) were reported in Windsor, as well as at the Ottawa and Toronto international airports. Kitchener/Waterloo Airport recorded a peak wind gust of 82 mph (132 km/h). Within the Derecho, four Tornadoes, three EF2's and one EF1 touched down in Southern Ontario Post storm damage investigation analysis identifies maximum wind speeds reaching 120 mph (190 km/h) in a 3.1 miles (5 km) corridor in Ottawa, resulting from embedded downbursts.
June 2022 Great Lakes derecho	June 13–14, 2022	Multiple mesoscale convective systems, with one classified as a derecho thus far by the National Weather Service in Northern Indiana, caused widespread damage and power outages across the Midwestern United States. Damage was particularly intense around the Fort Wayne, Indiana area and portions of northwest Ohio. Another possible derecho caused the worst power outages in the Cincinnati metropolitan area since the June 29, 2012, event. The derecho produced four tornadoes in Ohio and one tornado in Illinois.
July 2022 Midwest derecho	July 5, 2022	The storms went through the upper Midwest, causing widespread wind damage across the region. This makes the fourth derecho in 7 months to hit the area, when the area typically only gets one every two years. The storms were very high in precipitation, which made the sky appear as a bright green color. The derecho produced two tornadoes in Iowa. Peak winds of 99mph and softball sized hail. Four injuries reported.
February 2023 Southern Plains derecho	February 26, 2023	The derecho swept through the southern Plains states of Oklahoma and Kansas, leaving 75,000 without power through extensive wind damage. 15 tornadoes were confirmed, along with a 114-mph straight-line wind gust.
June 2023 Midwest derecho	June 29, 2023	A powerful derecho affected parts of Nebraska, Kansas, Iowa, Illinois, and Indiana also leaving over 300,000 without power. Winds of over 100 mph (160 km/h) were estimated in extreme southeastern Iowa and Western Illinois, with multiple reports of damaged roofs, destroyed outbuildings, and large trees blown over. The highest recorded wind gust was 90 mph (140 km/h) in Adrian, IL. In some areas, winds gusted over 70 mph (110 km/h) for 15 minutes. In addition, large hail up to 3.25" was reported, and at least eight tornadoes touched down, including one rated EF2. At least 7 people were injured.
Tornado outbreak and derecho of April 1–3, 2024	April 2, 2024	An MCS in the morning to noon hours caused damage from the Missouri/Illinois border to the West Virginia/Virginia state line. At least 17 tornadoes were confirmed to have touched down during a national radar outage that occurred during the event. Roughly 34 injuries were reported over all three days.
2024 Houston derecho	May 16, 2024	A derecho struck the Houston, Texas area, resulting in eight deaths (including one unconfirmed) and power outages to over one million customers. Wind gusts peaking at 85 mph (137 km/h) blew out windows in multiple buildings in downtown Houston. Two EF1 tornadoes were also confirmed near Cypress and Waller County.
Tornado outbreak sequence of May 19–27, 2024	May 19 and May 23–24, 2024	A derecho caused winds to 100 mph and large hail across Kansas and western Missouri on the 19th. Later on, another derecho impacted Nebraska, Iowa, and Illinois on the evening of May 23 into the morning of May 24.
July 2024 Midwest derecho	July 15, 2024	A derecho formed over Iowa, bringing winds over 70 mph to eastern Iowa and tornadoes to Des Moines. It continued east and south, bringing gusts over 100 mph, with a peak gust of 111 mph in Dunlap, IL. Winds up to 75 mph would also hit Chicago and Indiana before the line would weaken and dissipate. However, significant flooding would occur in southern Illinois the following morning associated as a result of the storm system. Multiple tornadoes were confirmed near Des Moines and Chicago as well as in central Illinois. 1 person was killed and 460,000 people were left without power.
April 2025 Ohio–West Virginia–Pennsylvania Derecho	April 29, 2025	A derecho began to form over southern Ohio and intensified over southwestern Pennsylvania before traveling across northern West Virginia and southwestern to central Pennsylvania at a speed of 70 mph. Wind speeds topped 80 mph, with a localized gust, estimated to be between 100 and 110 mph, knocking over a cellular phone tower in Cambria County, Pennsylvania. 755,000 customers across different electrical utility companies lost power for several days. Four deaths were attributed to falling trees or downed power cables related to the storm.
Tornado outbreak and derecho of June 19–22, 2025	June 20–21, 2025	A significant derecho moved through North Dakota, Minnesota, and Ontario. The derecho left over 23,000 people without power in the state of North Dakota and wind speeds at the Bemidji airport in Minnesota were recorded at 106 mph (171 km/h). The derecho was largely overshadowed by an EF5 tornado near Enderlin, North Dakota that was produced by one of two tornadic supercells that formed ahead of the derecho.
Tornado outbreak and derecho of June 9–11, 2026	June 10–11, 2026	
Tornado outbreak and derecho of June 21–22, 2026	June 21–22, 2026	
August 2026 Midwest derecho	August 11, 2026	The August 2026 Midwest derecho was a powerful derecho that started over Western Iowa before ending in Southern Tennessee and Northern Georgia. The derecho caused multiple tornado warnings throughout the Chicago area, power outages with an EF1 tornado in Columbus, Ohio and caused destructive severe thunderstorms in Cincinnati and Northern Kentucky.

== Europe ==
Event	Date	Notes
1674 derecho	1 August 1674	Utrecht cathedral partly collapsed; widespread and extreme damage everywhere in west and mid of country. Many well-built limestone homes were leveled to the ground, and many other churches suffered heavy damage. The damage was rated IF3 by the ESWD and the 5-second peak wind gusts were estimated to have been higher than 300 km/h. The 1674 derecho was the deadliest and most intense derecho in recorded history.
June 1929 Eastern Alpine Derecho	4 June 1929	A derecho hit Germany, Austria & Possibly Hungary, producing severe wind damage, including 1 F2 tornado that killed 1 person in Salzburg, Austria.
July 1929 Central Europe derecho	4 July 1929	A derecho or cluster of downbursts produced extraordinary damage (up to IF3) across Germany, Austria and Czech Republic. Extreme damage to forests, sturdy limestone houses and barns were almost fully leveled to the ground, and church towers collapsed. At least 38 people were killed by the extremely powerful downburst winds.
July 1995 Switzerland – Germany Derecho	22 July 1995	
July 2002 Finland derecho	5 July 2002	known as storm "Unto" in Finnish.
July 2002 Germany derecho	10 July 2002	(Crossair Flight 850)
2003 Mediterranean derecho	17 August 2003	Struck Catalonia, Spain and Languedoc to Roussillon, France with up to F2 damage
2007 winter derecho	18 January 2007	Significant derecho across northern and central Europe embedded within Kyrill windstorm caused many fatalities, and a tornado outbreak with the strongest tornado being rated high-end F3/T7
March 2008 Central Europe derecho	1 March 2008	Significant derecho embedded within Emma windstorm caused more than a dozen fatalities. An extreme downburst produced up to F3/T6 damage in Austria, with straight-line wind gusts higher than 250 km/h.
Middle Europa (Czech) Derecho	25–26 June 2008	
July 2009 Middle Europe Derecho	23–24 July 2009	
June 2010 Russia derecho	27 June 2010	First documented derecho event in Russia, affected the Yaroslavl and Vologda oblasts. 19 people were injured.
2010 Heat Wave derecho series	7–14 July 2010	Multiple significant derechos (with tornado(s)) across Belgium, the Netherlands
July 2010 Russia – Finland derecho	29–30 July 2010	Eighteen people were killed by falling trees in the Vsevolozhsky District where the derecho destroyed a campsite. The towns of Lyubytino, Nebolchi and Sosnovo were heavily damaged. The derecho caused a more than 370 mi (600 km) long swath of catastrophic forest damage extending from Novgorod Oblast to central Finland. The event was confirmed to be a derecho in Finland alone, extending the swath of wind damage to the west coast of the country.
August 2010 Baltic – Finland derecho	8 August 2010	Severe wind gusts more than 81 mph (130 km/h; 36 m/s) were measured in Estonia. This was determined to be a derecho event.
July 2011 Bulgaria derecho	20 July 2011	First derecho in Bulgaria to be studied.
June 2014 Western Germany derecho	9 June 2014	At least 6 killed and Highest gust 144 km/h (89 mph) in Düsseldorf, Germany.
July 2015 Poland derecho	19 July 2015	The supercell from western Saxony in Germany transformed into an expansive mesoscale storm system in Poland. Approximately 6000 wind damages were recorded all over the country. The derecho reached western Belarus during the night-time hours with total distance over 430 miles (700 km).
August 2017 Middle Europe derecho series	10–12 August 2017	10–11 August: A strong mesoscale system formed in central Austria at about 10 pm on August 10. The storm crossed eastern Czech Republic and central Poland during the night and hit Warsaw at about 7 am on August 11. At least one person was dead because of storm wind gusts. About 200,000 buildings were without electric power. 11–12 August: Severe wind gusts with more than 90 mph (140 km/h) were recorded in western and central Poland. 6 people were killed and 62 injured, almost half a million buildings were without power. 8.2 million cubic metres of trees fell down by the windstorm. 21,944 wind damages were recorded. Elbląg recorded 94 mph (152 km/h) winds as a result.
August 2022 Corsica derecho	18 August 2022	At least five people killed at Corsica (France), 5 also in Austria and 2 in Italy. Wind gusts at its peak – 224 km/h. (140 mph) The storm which started near Barcelona (Spanish east coast) crossed the Balearic Sea and hit Corsica island with the full force at its peak. Then the mesoscale system hit Northern Italy and reached Southern Austria in total distance more than 1000 km. (more than 621 miles) The highest wind gust was also the highest in Europe, 2022
October 2022 Scandinavia and the Baltic Sea derecho	October 16, 2022	A derecho that started in Denmark and continued through the southern portions of Norway, Sweden, and Finland and into northern Estonia. Two tornadoes occurred in Norway, both rated F1 on the Fujita scale and IF1 on the International Fujita scale. Widespread wind damage was observed, and the highest wind gust observed was 39.2 metres per second (141 km/h; 88 mph). Local flooding in some places was also reported, together with power outages from lightning strikes & severe wind. As of October 19, 2022, 173 severe weather reports were reported as a result of the derecho.
June 2023 Northern Alpine derecho	June 21, 2023	A derecho struck the far northern part of the alpine mountains in Germany, and continued into the Czech Republic, Austria and Slovakia. The strongest gust reached 42 m/s (151 km/h). Nobody was killed, but 5 people were injured
July 2023 Balkan derecho	July 19, 2023	At least 5 killed and dozens of injured from mesoscale system formed in Northern Italy. MCS system proceeded towards Slovenia with a speed of more than 80 km/h. The size of hail was up to 13 cm. The largest wind and rain damages were reported in Zagreb, where the wind speed, measured at Zagreb airport, reached 115 km/h, and the amount of precipitation was 20 to 35 mm in only 10 minutes. As a result of what was, possibly, the strongest storm on the record in Zagreb, the city was left with fallen trees, flooded areas, and widespread damage, and two people died. In the evening, while moving further east, the storm caused damage and a casualty in the eastern part of Croatia. The last wind speed measured at the automatic weather station Gradiste, in the easternmost part of Croatia was 50 m/s, after which the station collapsed from the wind. The storm crossed from northern Italy to Serbia in less than 12 hours.
June 2025 France Derecho	June 25–26, 2025	A derecho, confirmed by Keraunos, began in northern Spain before intensifying, sweeping northeast across France. The strongest wind gust was 140 km/h (87 mph) in Bailleul-le-Soc; hail up to 10 cm (3.9 in) in diameter was observed. Two people were killed and 17 were injured across the country.
August 2026 France Derecho	August 24, 2026	Keraunos confirmed a derecho, more info to come.

== South America ==
Event	Date	Notes
Amazon Blowdown	16–18 January 2005	Massive derecho downed ~540 million trees within the Amazon rainforest of Brazil
Buenos Aires Derecho	4 April 2012	Severe straight-line winds and five tornadoes caused 25 confirmed deaths near Buenos Aires, Argentina. Unofficially, more than 100 people were killed. It's also possible that many embbeded vortices were produced by the squall line, or gustnadoes, instead of tornadoes. Most of the damage was in fact produced by extreme downbursts.
December 2012 Uruguay-Brazil Derecho	16 December 2012	Powerful squall line of severe thunderstorms produced wind gusts up to 160 km/h in Uruguay and up to 177 km/h in Rio Grande do Sul state (Brazil).
May 2013 Rio Grande do Sul Derecho	29 May 2013	A long-lived bow echo produced an extensive swath of damaging winds in the early morning hours in extreme southern Brazil.
October 2014 Rio Grande do Sul Derecho	18–19 October 2014	A fast-moving nocturnal/early-morning bow echo displaying a bow-and-arrow mesoscale convective structure, a strong rear-inflow jet, and a mesoscale convective vortex produced a swath of damaging winds along a path of more than 310 miles (500 km) in southern Brazil.
Southern Brazil Derecho of June 30, 2020	30 June 2020	Long-lived and linear derecho caused by an extratropical cyclone (bomb cyclone), causing widespread wind destruction across various municipalities of all states in the Southern Region of the country. Isolated tornadoes also occurred. Highest measured windgust was 110 mph (180 km/h). The squall line then weakened before reaching São Paulo and Mato Grosso do Sul states causing widespread heavy rain. The remnants of this squall line reached the state of Minas Gerais state, causing widespread and unseasonal scattered showers, before dissipating completely.
July 2022 Paysandú Derecho	11 July 2022	A derecho struck the town of Paysandú, Uruguay, causing the loss of 400 trees, damaging 11000 homes and injuring more than 30 people. The event was unprecedented in the town, only comparable to the 2016 Dolores tornado. The squall line produced wind gusts higher than 160 km/h.
December 2023 Buenos Aires Bow-Echo Storm	16–17 December 2023	Squall line with a bow-echo signature. A wind gust of 190 km/h was measured at a private weather station from the municipality of Bahía Blanca (Buenos Aires Province). Extensive damage and many fatalities were recorded.
Southern Brazil Derecho of September 2026	21-22 September 2026	Squall line hit Southern Brazil, with Rio Grande do Sul being the most impacted region. The line of storms had a bow-echo signature, with mesovorticies present. 18 tornadoes happened, with one being a F2 in Pedras Altas and wind gusts over 100 km/h being measured.

== Asia ==
Event	Date	Notes
Huanghuai Area Derecho	June 3–4, 2009	An intense squall line impacted the Chinese provinces of Shanxi, Henan, Shandong, Anhui, and Jiangsu, killing 22 people.

== See also ==
- Bow echo
- Line echo wave pattern
- List of microbursts
- List of tornadoes and tornado outbreaks
- Mesoscale convective system and Mesoscale convective complex
- Mesovortex
- Severe thunderstorm
- Squall line
- Straight-line winds
- Tornado
