= Weather records in Windsor, Ontario =

Extreme weather has been known to hit Windsor, Ontario, and the city is home to several local, national, and international weather records. They are shown below, organized chronologically (by date):

== 1913 ==
- March 21: The area between Windsor and Cobalt in Ontario was affected by winds gusting up to 150 km/h. 7 people were killed during the storm which also damaged buildings and uprooted trees.

== 1922 ==
- March 30: 30–40 mm freezing rain affected south Ontario from the Windsor area to an area just north of Toronto.

== 1943 ==
- March 8: Temperatures in Windsor, ON drop to −19.4 °C (−3 °F), the coldest March night on record here.

== 1946 ==
- June 17: An F4 tornado tracking from near Detroit, Michigan (River Rouge, Michigan), via Windsor to Tecumseh, Ontario kills 17 and injures hundreds more. 400 homes in Windsor were damaged or destroyed. This is Canada's third worst killer tornado.

== 1953 ==
- June 20: The highest humidex reading ever recorded in Windsor (and in Canada until it was surpassed by Carman, Manitoba in 2007) occurred, hitting 52.1. The temperature was 37 °C (99 °F).

== 1966 ==
- May 10: Lows drop to −2.8 °C (27 °F) in Windsor, ON, the coldest May night on record here.

== 1967 ==
- October 4: Temperatures reach 28.9 °C (84 °F) in Windsor, Ontario, the highest temperature recorded across Canada in October 1967.

== 1973 ==
- January 29: Windsor Coldest temperature recorded on record (−32.8 °C or −27 °F)

== 1974 ==
- April 3: Windsor's costliest disaster, an F3 tornado, hits, as a part of the 1974 Super Outbreak.

== 1984 ==
- September 2: 8 tornadoes touch down between Windsor and London, Ontario.

== 1985 ==
- April 7: Southern Ontario was affected by winds gusting up to 110 km/h. Among the consequences were Power failures from Windsor to Belleville, 7 people being stranded in a lift at the Skylon Tower at the Niagara Falls when the lift cables were twisted in the wind and the wind combined with pack ice on the Welland Canal to block the canal stopping shipping traffic.
- May 30: Golf ball size hail in the Windsor and Leamington areas of Ontario causing $30–40 million damage.

== 1988 ==
- June 25: The temperature hit 40.2 °C. At 38.2 °C it was also the hottest day on record in London, Ontario, as well.

== 1990 ==
- November 1: Record breaking temperatures spreads much into Southern Ontario bringing the temperature up to 21 °C.

== 1991 ==
- July 7–8: See: Southern Great Lakes Derecho of 1991

== 1995 ==
- July 14: Extreme hot temperatures shattered into much of Southern Ontario and the Great Lakes which saw the mercury in Windsor rise to 38 °C. This was all part of the 1995 Chicago heat wave which saw temperature in Chicago rise to 41 °C.

== 1997 ==
- February 27: 110 km/h winds affected the Windsor, ON area damaging buildings, smashing windows and uprooting trees.
- July 2: Windsor is hit by tornadoes, along with Metro Detroit in the Southeast Michigan Tornado Outbreak.
- August 16: Further rough weather rolls through, with a funnel cloud spotted south of Amherstburg, Ontario, over Lake Erie, causing a tornado warning for Toledo, Ohio and Wood County.

== 1998 ==
- March 22: A spell of snow over Southern Ontario from Windsor to the Ottawa Valley that began on the evening of the 20th came to an end. Generally 15–25 cm snow fell and in the Niagara Peninsula more than 35 cm snow fell. 19
- March 30: Very unusually warm weather spreads into southern Ontario bringing the temperature in Windsor up to 25 °C.
- December 6: Temperature soars up to 19 °C making it one of the warmest Decembers in Southern Ontario on record.

== 1999 ==
- September 3: One of Canada's worst road disasters occurred in dense early morning fog which suddenly sprung up near Windsor, Ontario on Highway 401 just east of Exit 21, reducing visibility to less than 1 metre. Out of 87 automobiles and trucks involved, 82 vehicles were destroyed, 8 people were killed and 33 others were injured.
- November 9: Very unusually warm late summer, mid-September like mild temperatures broke records across most of Ontario. Temperatures that day in Windsor soars up to 23 °C.

== 2000 ==
- February 26: saw temperatures in London, ON reach 17.8 °C whilst in Windsor temperatures topped 20 °C for the first time on record in February.
- March 7: Temperatures exceeded 25 °C in Windsor, Sarnia, Petrolia and Strathroy (all in Ontario). Records show that this is the earliest temperatures over 25 °C have been reached here, beating the old record by more than 3 weeks.
- April 20: 94.6 mm rain fell in Windsor, Ontario, well above the total average precipitation for the whole month of April (74.9 mm). London and Sarnia were also really wet, recording 66.4 mm and 51.2 mm rain respectively.

== 2001 ==
- August 8: A heat wave invades much of Southern Ontario and northeastern US. Temperature in Windsor rose up to 37 °C.
- December 5: Windsor and much of Southern Ontario saw an unusually mild late September temperatures with the mercury soaring up to 18 °C. This was very well known to be one of the warmest Decembers ever recorded in Southern Ontario.

== 2002 ==
- February 25: The temperature peaked at 15.1 °C in Windsor, Ontario, the highest temperature recorded in the whole of Canada in the whole of February 2002.
- March 26: An early Spring storm brought snow to much of southern Ontario, and some freezing rain to the St. Catharines/Hamilton area. Among the storm snowfall totals was 24.5 cm in Cornwall, 15 cm in Kitchener, 13 cm in Peterborough, 12 cm in Barrie, 11 cm in Windsor, between 7 and 12 cm snow fell in Toronto and 8 cm in Hamilton.
- April 8 – April 9: Heavy rain on the 8th and 9th (mainly on the 8th) over parts of Ontario knocks out power to 4,000 customers in Muskoka. Among the wettest places were Windsor with 31 mm and Hamilton with 22 mm rain; here it was the wettest weather since January 31. Meanwhile, in Wiarton, conditions were much wetter and 41 mm rain fell.
- April 11: Temperatures peak at 20.5C in London and 20.7C in Windsor, the warmest weather here since October 25, 2001 when temperatures topped 20 °C for the last time. Meanwhile, Medicine Hat reached 17.5 °C, the warmest weather here since the first half of November 2001 whilst 17.9 °C in Saskatoon was their warmest weather since early October 2001.
- April 16: Temperatures in an area extending from Windsor and London northeastwards across the Barrie, Hamilton and Greater Toronto Area areas to Ottawa reached 28–30 °C, the hottest weather in this area since September 9, 2001.

== 2003 ==
- February 23: A major winter storm affected southern and eastern Ontario on the February 22 and 23. 15 to 30 cm snow fell across many parts of regions extending from Windsor across Barrie-Huronia and Ski country into the National Capital Region/Ottawa area. Locally as much as 30 to 40 cm snow fell and drifts up to 60 cm deep were reported. On the morning of the 23rd snow depths included 20 cm in Windsor, 17 cm in Hamilton, 10–15 cm in Kitchener, 26 cm in Grand Valley, 28 cm in Vaughan, 20–30 cm in Maple, Northern Toronto, 20 to 25 cm in Barrie, 34 cm in Orillia, 25 cm in Brampton, 27 cm in Minden and 20–37 cm in the Ottawa area. The greatest snow depth was 37 cm recorded in Franktown, southwest Ottawa. Freezing rain and ice pellets also affected the Niagara region and the north shore of Lake Ontario. Ice accretions as high as 2–4 cm were reported in Prince Edward County
- March 3: A cold start across Ontario. Overnight lows fell to −24.7C at Pearson Airport, Toronto, −30.5 in Wiarton, −29.4C in Kitchener, −24.6 °C in Hamilton, −34.7 °C in Sudbury, −32.3 °C in Gore Bay, −31.0 °C in Petawawa, −19.7 °C in Windsor, −29.2 °C in Peterborough and −22.3 °C in Sarnia.
- April 28: Summery over southern Ontario and Quebec with temperatures up to 26.4 °C in Toronto, 26.1 °C in Windsor, 25.1 °C in Ottawa, 25.5 °C in Sarnia and 24.3C in London. Montreal reached 23.7 °C, Sherbrooke reached 24.3 °C and Maniwaki reached 25.1 °C.

== 2006 ==
- October 12: Somewhat unusually cool air allows 0.51 cm of snow to fall, just enough to break the old record of the earliest snowfall of the season. The previous record was October 13. The requirements for measurement is 0.25 cm or higher. Below that, it would have been measured as a "trace" amount of snow, and would not have been a record.

== 2007 ==
- March 26: Unusually warm air pushes the Jet Stream far north into the Hudson Bay, causing record high temperatures across much of Ontario, the Great Lakes, Midwestern United States, and New England. Windsor's old record of 23 °C was shattered, reaching a balmy 27 °C.

== 2008 ==
- January 7: Unusually warm winter weather peaks at 13 °C, breaking the previous local record of 12.8 °C set in 1989.

== 2009 ==
- April 24: Windsor and Southern Ontario experience a small heat wave, with temperatures in Windsor reaching 30.7 °C.

== 2011 ==
- April 11: Summer-like conditions in Windsor brought temperatures up to 26 °C with a humidex of 32 °C while temperatures in the rest of Southern Ontario (excluding Southwestern Ontario) only remained in the single digits. Nearby Detroit, Michigan reached 27 °C with a humidex of 33 °C at one point during the day.
- July 21: One of the worst heat waves recorded in North America's history was reported in much of the Midwest and Eastern US and much of Southern Ontario with temperatures in Windsor rising up to 37 °C.

== 2012 ==
- July 4 and 17: Very hot temperatures shattered into much of Southern Ontario and eastern US with Windsor temperatures on both of these days climbs up to 38 °C.

== 2014 ==
- January 7: Extreme cold temperatures invades much of Southern Canada and Midwest and Northeastern US with windchill temperatures in Windsor plunging down to −39 C, close to all-time low of −42 C.

== 2015 ==
- November 4: Windsor saw a daily record 23.9 °C (75.0 °F). An unseasonably late summer, mid-September like mild temperatures broke records across most of Ontario between November 3 and 5, 2015. More mild record breaking temperatures were reported a month later around Christmas Day, which most of Ontario saw a "Green Christmas".

== 2016 ==
- May 15: A rare mid-May snow fell in Windsor along with the rest of Southern Ontario and the Great Lakes region. In that overnight, temperature plunges down to the record low of 0 °C (32 °F).

== See also ==
- List of tornadoes and tornado outbreaks
- List of tornadoes striking downtown areas
- List of Canadian Tornadoes
- Windsor Ontario: Climate sub-article
