= June 2020 Rocky Mountains-Northern Plains derecho =

Derecho event

The June 2020 Rocky Mountains-Northern Plains derecho was a rare derecho that moved across at least 750 miles and affected eight US states on June 6, 2020. The derecho was notable for forming in a highly unusual location west of the Rocky Mountains and crossing the Continental Divide. The storm which crossed the entire state of Colorado was the first such storm to impact the state on record and only the third of this type reported in the Western United States.

== Meteorological history ==
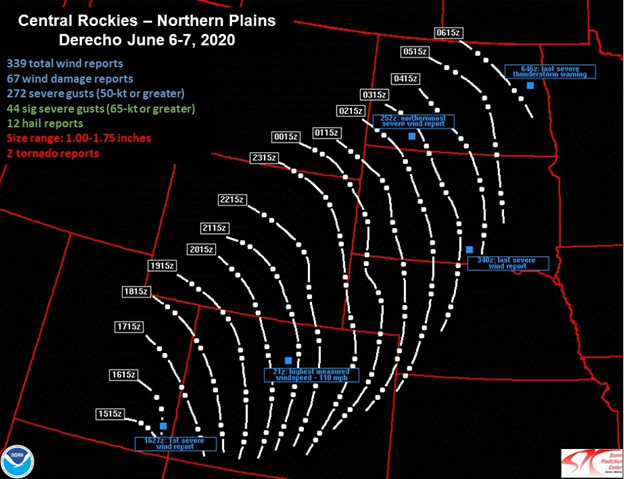
Map showing the path of the derecho

On the morning of June 6, a large trough of low pressure off the West Coast of the United States caused jet stream winds to move from the southwest to the northeast across the Rocky Mountains. A shortwave trough embedded in the southwest flow moved across the Rocky Mountains creating a highly unstable atmosphere and wind gusts between 59 and 71 mph across the state. This caused the Storm Prediction Center to issue slight and enhanced risks of severe weather across much of the North Central United States. At around 9 AM local time a cluster of thunderstorms developed over southeast Utah. Guided by the trough these storms moved northeast and crossed the Continental Divide at around noon. The Rocky Mountains generally disrupt thunderstorm systems but this system was too powerful. The National Weather Service in Boulder issued the largest severe thunderstorm warning it has ever issued covering an area of over 20,000 square miles. The storm moved into South Dakota by six in the evening and dissipated in eastern North Dakota by midnight the next day.

== Impact ==
The derecho caused widespread strong wind gusts. The strongest gust was reported near Winter Park, Colorado at 110 mph (180 km/h). A station at Denver International Airport reported a peak wind gust of 78 mph. Widespread wind speeds of 60–75 mph (97–121 km/h) were observed throughout the Greater Denver area. In Colorado, a total of 91 severe wind reports were recorded on June 6, 2020, the most reports on record for a single day. There were also 17 reports of wind gusts higher than 75 mph (121 km/h) across Colorado on June 6. In South Dakota, the derecho caused at least two tornadoes and widespread reports of wind gusts over 58 mph (93 km/h). A wind gust of 94 mph (151 km/h) was reported in Butte County, South Dakota. Sections of I-94 were closed when high winds toppled vehicles and caused damage at construction sites. The strong winds uprooted and snapped numerous trees throughout the affected region causing hundreds of thousands of people to lose power including over 200,000 in Colorado. Falling trees damaged homes and vehicles and one Denver resident was injured. A Denver billboard was toppled crushing several cars, and windows were shattered in Littleton.

== See also ==
- List of derecho events
- Tornadoes of 2020
- Weather of 2020
- June 2020 Pennsylvania-New Jersey Derecho—a derecho that hit the eastern United States three days earlier
