= Ohio Fireworks Derecho =

Weather event

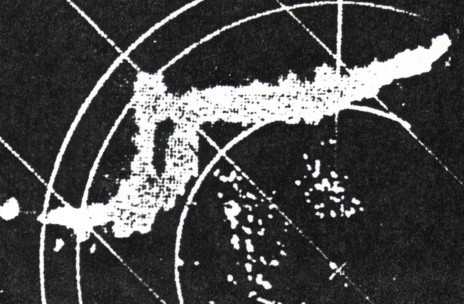
- The Ohio Fireworks Derecho was one of the first bow echos and line echo wave patterns to be radar-documented.
- Date(s): July 4, 1969
- Peak wind gust (measured): 104 mph (167 km/h; 46.5 m/s) (Sandusky, Ohio)
- Fatalities: At least 40

The Ohio Fireworks Derecho (or also the Ohio Independence Day derecho of 1969), was a severe wind event that took place during the evening hours of July 4 (American Independence Day) 1969. It affected the northern half of the state of Ohio as well as portions of Pennsylvania, southern Michigan, northern West Virginia and extreme southwestern New York. It was one of the numerous events of that type that hit a region in the United States during its national holiday, the others being in 1977, 1980, and 1999.

== Event ==
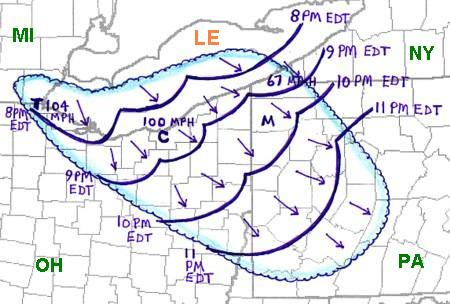
Track of the Ohio Fireworks Derecho

The event started out during the afternoon hours as a line of thunderstorms developed in southern Michigan. At about 6 p.m., as it reached the southern suburbs of the Detroit Metro area in Lenawee and Monroe counties, it quickly became a major derecho. It entered northwestern Ohio near the Toledo area packing winds that locally exceeded 100 miles per hour (161 km/h) which downed scores of trees all over the city.

Moving at a fairly quick pace, the mesoscale then hit the Sandusky and Cleveland areas creating extensive damage to some of its suburbs, including Lakewood, Rocky River and Linndale. Major damage was also reported over communities right along the Lake Erie shoreline. Winds also peaked near 100 miles per hour (161 km/h) in Cleveland, causing extensive power outages. An F3 tornado was confirmed in Flat Rock, Michigan on the day of this event.

At about midnight, after affecting northeastern Ohio and the Pittsburgh area, the storm weakened and dissipated near the borders of Pennsylvania, West Virginia and Maryland.

== Aftermath ==
This derecho event, although short-lived in comparison with other such events, was one of the deadliest ever. Eighteen people were killed in Ohio alone, including seven in Cleveland. Many of them were from toppled trees. At least three people who were watching holiday fireworks from small boats on Lake Erie drowned after being thrown off their boats by the high winds. Over 100 boats were destroyed or flipped over on Lake Erie. There were also injuries reported in western Pennsylvania.

In 2009, a temporary exhibit stood in Edgewater Park (part of the Lakefront Reservation of the Cleveland Metroparks) in Cleveland commemorating the event.

== See also ==
- List of derecho events
