= List of downbursts =

This is a list of notable downbursts (microbursts or macrobursts).

== List ==
=== Before 1900 ===
- August 1, 1674 - An extraordinarily extreme downburst associated with a bow echo led to the partial collapse of a well-built cathedral from Utrecht, Netherlands. Many limestone homes were leveled to the ground and many churches were destroyed across the country. Peak wind gusts were estimated to have reached (~325 km/h; ~200 mph) at the Utrecht cathedral.
- July 13, 1890 – A microburst capsized the vessel Sea Wing on Lake Pepin between Wisconsin and Minnesota, killing 98 people.

=== 1960s ===
- A particularly violent microburst is a possible alternative explanation to the 1961 sinking of the American school brigantine Albatross. The ship's captain Dr. Christopher Sheldon claimed that the ship was hit by a white squall on the voyage from Progreso, Yucatán, to Nassau in the Bahamas.

=== 1980s-1990s ===
- 1980–1995 – FAA-supported investigations into microburst morphology and microburst detection and warning systems. Principals: Ted Fujita, U. Chicago, John McCarthy and James Wilson, NCAR, J. Evans and Marilyn M. Wolfson, MIT Lincoln Laboratory, R Bowles and F Proctor, NASA). Hundreds of microbursts were detected and studied, many by dual Doppler weather radar analysis. Several had intensities in excess of 80 knots (92 mph; 150 km/h).
- August 1, 1983 – The strongest microburst recorded at an airport was observed at Andrews Air Force Base, Maryland, near Washington, DC. The wind speeds may have exceeded 150 mph (240 km/h) in this microburst. The peak gust was recorded at 2:11 PM –-7 minutes after Air Force One, with the President on board, landed on the same runway.
- June 11, 1984 - Shortly before midnight, a severe thunderstorm produced an exceptionally severe downburst near Rowena, South Dakota. Wind gusts were estimated at 160 mph (257 km/h) by Ted Fujita.
- August 2, 1985 - Delta Flight 191 encountered a microburst while attempting to land at Dallas-Fort Worth Airport and subsequently crashed, killing 136 passengers and crew on board the aircraft and one person on the ground.
- May 1986 – A microburst squall with wind speeds of 80 mph (130 km/h) is responsible for capsizing and sinking the Pride of Baltimore in the Caribbean Sea, about 250 mi (400 km) north of Puerto Rico. The ship took the lives of her captain and three of her other 11 crew members.
- May 13, 1989 — A microburst damaged around 200 helicopters and other aircraft at Fort Hood, Texas, at an estimated cost of $600 million, despite the aircraft being secured for storm weather.
- July 8, 1989 – Denver Stapleton International Airport. After being alerted by LLWAS of an imminent encounter with a 95 kn (109 mph; 176 km/h) microburst, Captain Craig Levine initiated a missed approach, taking his Boeing 737 to full takeoff power, climbing 400 ft (120 m) and adding 40 kn (46 mph; 74 km/h) of airspeed. Encountering the microburst at full takeoff power, they lost 400 ft (120 m) of altitude and lost 50 kn (58 mph; 93 km/h) of airspeed in about one-half of a minute. This event is a documented "save" of an airplane by a windshear alert system.
- August 7, 1994 – Severe thunderstorms produce numerous reports of damaging winds (and large hail) across central, southern, and southeastern Oklahoma. The worst damage occurs in Prague, where estimated winds of 90 mph (140 km/h) produced widespread damage across town, downed the steeple of a church, partially unroofed the high school, and damaged to destroyed mobile homes.
- August 17, 1994 – A series of extreme downbursts are produced by a southward moving long-lived supercell thunderstorm across south-central Kansas and western Oklahoma, whereafter new severe storms fire in western Oklahoma and drop into north Texas. Severe damage occurs across a long and narrow swath with numerous reports of 80–100 mph (130–160 km/h) winds and a then record gust of 113 mph (182 km/h) is measured at the Lahoma Oklahoma Mesonet site. At least two tornadoes and windblown hail the size of softballs and footballs also occur.
- July 15, 1995 – A series of microbursts hit northern and eastern New York State, killing 5 people, injuring 11, and causing nearly a half billion dollars in damages. It was the second derecho of a series during mid-July. The storms severely damaged 125,000 acres (51,000 ha; 195 sq mi; 510 km^{2}) of forest in the Adirondack Park, necessitating the helicopter rescue of 31 hikers/backpackers stranded in the backcountry due to blocked trails.
- October 20, 1995 – A morning downburst accompanied by hail caused widespread damage, 35 injuries and 1 death in Piracicaba, Brazil, with wind gusts up to 78 mph (126 km/h).
- May 21, 1996 – A microburst caused extensive damage and 60 injuries in Plymouth County, Massachusetts, where winds were clocked at 104 mph (167 km/h). Brockton, Whitman, and Abington were the hardest hit towns.
- On August 14, 1996 a severe thunderstorm and its accompanying dry microburst hit the northwest portion of the Phoenix metropolitan area, ripping off tile roofs and causing $160 million in damage. An Arizona-record wind gust of 115 mph (185 km/h) was recorded at the Deer Valley Airport. A few locations had to go without power for several days.
- In the early hours of September 7, 1998, a microburst hit the city of Syracuse, New York. Three people were killed and the area suffered $130 million in damages.

=== 2000s ===
- On July 12, 2002, a microburst hit the town of Quincy, CA, snapping trees and damaging homes in a random pattern.
- On March 12, 2006, at approximately 8:10 AM, a severe microburst with winds varying from 70–90 mph (110–140 km/h) damaged large portions of Lawrence, Kansas. Reported damage included downed power lines, stop lights and trees, overturned semi-trailers, collapsed farm silos and damage to roofs. Seventy buildings on the University of Kansas campus reported damage. In total, over $8 million in damages was estimated.
- On May 6, 2008, a microburst made by a LP/HP supercell hit Olton, Texas. It did no damage.
- On November 16, 2008, an extreme microburst during a severe supercell thunderstorm left a swath of very intense and extensive damage on the suburb of The Gap in Brisbane, Queensland, Australia. Peak wind gusts were measured at 180 km/h.
- On February 12, 2009, high winds from a microburst caused a 92 mph (148 km/h) wind gust in West Mifflin, Pennsylvania. Several damages were reported including roofs and garages collapsing.
- On May 2, 2009, a microburst struck the Dallas Cowboys indoor practice facility in Irving, Texas, causing the roof to collapse. 12 people were hospitalized.
- On July 11, 2009, winds believed to be caused by a microburst uprooted trees and brought down close to 30 utility poles in Mississauga, Ontario.
- On July 21, 2009, a strong thunderstorm produced a probable microburst in the western and southern suburbs of Denver, Colorado, causing extensive damage to trees and property. Cities that were most affected were Lakewood, Wheat Ridge, and Arvada.
- In the evening of August 18, 2009, an isolated thunderstorm originated in Bridgewater when a boundary generated from rain-cooled air associated with the isolated thunderstorm quickly shifted east toward Newark, New Jersey. Shortly thereafter, the isolated thunderstorm quickly intensified strong-to-severe while in the vicinity of Newark and after the intensification, the isolated severe thunderstorm produced 0.75 in (1.9 cm) hail in Hoboken and Weehawken. The isolated severe thunderstorm changed direction from moving east to northeast as the thunderstorm approached and shortly affected Manhattan, New York City. The isolated severe thunderstorm was responsible for producing 70 kn (81 mph; 130 km/h) thunderstorm wind gust, resulted a possible microburst that downed over few more than 500 trees, damaged several automobiles and spread debris across some streets.

=== 2010s ===
- On February 17, 2010, a microburst caused the capsizing and sinking of the tall ship Concordia some 550 km (340 mi) southeast of Rio de Janeiro, Brazil in rough seas. All 64 people who were on board (48 students attending school on board, eight teachers and eight crew) were rescued from 5 life rafts by merchant vessels.
- In the afternoon of June 24, 2010, there were reports of 52 kn (60 mph; 96 km/h) thunderstorm winds that downed tree limbs with some roads temporarily blocked by fallen tree limbs as the linear cluster of severe thunderstorms impacted across northern New Jersey and southeastern New York. Nutley, Cliffside Park, and Pompton are locations that reported downed tree limbs. 61 kn (70 mph; 113 km/h) thunderstorm wind was reported in SUNY Maritime College that knocked down trees and tree limbs when the linear clusters quickly changed into a severe thunderstorm after leaving The Bronx and central portions of Manhattan counties. 54 kn (62 mph; 100 km/h) thunderstorm gust was reported twice in LaGuardia Airport and fallen trees destroyed two homes and one car in College Point. 70 kn (81 mph; 130 km/h) thunderstorm wind was reported in Whitestone, responsible for downed numerous utility poles, street lamps, trees, at least one collapsed chimney, and damaged several vehicles, including a destroyed mini-van. Besides from thunderstorm wind damage, a funnel cloud was reported over Flushing Bay and the severe thunderstorm dumped at least golf ball sized hail in Queens side of Throgs Neck Bridge that was reported earlier with at least one car dented. After the aftermath of northeastern Queens, the severe thunderstorm produced 64 kn (74 mph; 119 km/h) thunderstorm gust in Kings Point and 87 kn (100 mph; 161 km/h) thunderstorm wind that was reported near Great Neck, resulted a microburst that accompanied dime-to-quarter sized hail and downed numerous large trees, powerlines and uprooted trees. The microburst produced winds exceeding 60–100 mph (97–161 km/h) that caused significant damage to homes and automobiles across Long Island.
- In the afternoon of June 24, 2010, a severe thunderstorm resembling characteristics of a supercell produced a wet microburst exceed 100 mph (160 km/h) winds and severe hail in the townships of Drexel Hill, Springfield, and Broomall, Pennsylvania in Delaware County, uprooted trees and damaged homes.
- On August 25, 2010, a microburst storm squall hit in the Lake Elsinore, California had snapped power poles.
- On September 1, 2010, a microburst was reported in West Yellowstone, Montana. The microburst, originally thought to be a tornado, topped at 80 mph (130 km/h), and ripped off 90% of the roof at Yellowstone Park Inn and Suites.
- On September 16, 2010, a macroburst was reported in the Middle Village and Forest Hills areas of Queens, New York during an unexpected linear/bowing segments contained intense thunderstorms that spawned two weak tornadoes. In a city with a population of 9 million people, only one fatality was reported. A tree fell on a Pennsylvania couple's vehicle and killed the wife.
- On September 22, 2010, in the Hegewisch neighborhood of Chicago, a wet microburst hit with winds upwards of 100 mph (160 km/h), causing severe localized damage and power outages, including fallen-tree impacts into at least four homes. No fatalities were reported.
- On May 27, 2011, in the Morgantown, West Virginia neighborhood of Westover, a wet microburst hit with winds in the 70–80 mph (110–130 km/h) range. The National Weather Service, reported that "numerous trees came down in the Westover area. A metal roof from a car dealership was blown off in downtown Morgantown...while trees were uprooted on the campus of West Virginia University, including a 122-year-old silver maple which was the fifth oldest tree on the campus. The strong winds knocked down or uprooted trees sporadically eastward until the storm reached the Pleasant Hill Cemetery."
- On June 14, 2011 a microburst hit Norman, Oklahoma (a suburb of Oklahoma City) with wind speeds of up to 82 miles per hour (132 km/h) and hail up to golf ball size. An inch (2.54 cm) of rain fell within 20 minutes, causing areas of flash flooding. The storm caused widespread damage to both residences and businesses across the town. Electrical poles were snapped causing power outages to 33,000 residents.
- On July 31, 2011, a microburst hit in the Victorville, California thousands were customers had lost power.
- On July 18, 2012, a microburst hit in Arlington, Massachusetts. Gusts were 70 to 80 mph, with worst damage in about a square mile area. Many trees and utility poles were damaged, tearing power lines from homes. There was one report of a fish blown five blocks from a pond that was near the center of the storm.
- On July 20, 2012 a microburst hit Ferry County, Washington with winds of up to 100 mph. Two people were killed in the storm, and it cost over $2 million in electrical damage, blowing down over 900 miles of power lines. Over 3,000 forested acres were destroyed from the associated remnants of Hurricane Fabio.
- On August 30, 2012, a severe microburst hit in Moreno Valley, California, and winds gust to 90 mph squall line in Apple Valley, California.
- On December 16, 2012, a squall line (possibly a derecho) produced a downburst with a gust of 177 km/h in Dom Pedrito (Rio Grande do Sul).
- On July 19, 2013, a microburst hit in Las Vegas, Nevada causing severely knocked out trees and power lines. Wind gusts have been reported to reach 70-80 mph.
- On July 21, 2013, a macroburst hit Piracicaba, Brazil, accompanied by large hail and causing damage in almost all the city neighborhoods. Wind gusts reached up to 128.5 km/h (80 mph). At least four people were injured.
- On June 3, 2014 - An extremely violent downburst left at least 325 roofs collapsed, 30 metal structures damaged, 700 brick walls torn down, 320 trees downed, and dozens of concrete posts collapsed or snapped, in the brazilian municipality of Taiobeiras (Minas Gerais). Many houses with ceramic tiles suffered major unroofing, and several schools were extensively damaged. A large and very tall telephone tower was destroyed and was torn in half. A gas station was completely destroyed. 13 people were injured. Wind gusts exceeded 150 km/h in some areas.
- On July 3, 2014, in the town of Cherryville, North Carolina a wet microburst tore apart a portion of a gas station car wash and brought down powerlines and trees. One tree fell on top of a mobile home nearly cutting it in half. The resident was injured when the fallen tree pinned him to the floor.
- On July 7, 2014, a microburst hit Tomball, Texas causing severe localized damage and power outages, including fallen-trees.
- On July 26, 2014, a wet microburst hit northern parts of Phoenix, Arizona felling trees, damaging homes, and causing power outages.
- On August 7, 2014 an apparent microburst toppled dozens of boats in the Dillon Reservoir in Dillon, Colorado, leaving emergency workers scrambling to get boaters out of the cold water.
- On October 15, 2014 - Unusually severe wet downburst from a rare supercell in the municipality of Tangará da Serra (Mato Grosso). It occurred during the afternoon and left major widespread damage across the town. A car was reportedly overturned. Wind gusts clocked at 160.9 km/h.
- On December 20, 2014, many destructive downbursts were produced by a squall line in the state of Rio Grande do Sul (Brazil). An embedded supercell thunderstorm in Porto Alegre, brought destructive wind gusts up to (80 mph; 130 km/h), producing significant damage. The main squall line brought an extremely severe wet microburst that affected Sant'Ana do Livramento. More than 400 homes were damaged, and some of them were completely destroyed, with trees being toppled and power poles snapped. In addition, eight wind turbines were destroyed by estimated extreme gusts up to 250 km/h.
- On June 23, 2015, a microburst hit Gloucester County and Camden County, New Jersey, causing major power outages across the region. Many homes and roads were damaged by fallen trees and debris from the storm.
- On July 29, 2015, a microburst hit in the Phelan, California had knocked out power.
- On October 31, 2016, an extreme downburst from a collapsing HP supercell produced major damage in the town of Piriapolis (Uruguay). A wind gust of 180 km/h was measured at the town hall private weather station, before it was destroyed by the gust. Besides that, schools, homes, medical centers were severely damaged and hundreds of trees and power poles were downed.
- On May 4, 2017, a microburst hit in Lacey, Washington had uprooted trees and fallen power lines.
- On Sept 3, 2017, a microburst hit in Santa Barbara, California and knocked off numerous trees and many landed on cars with many power lines down. Multiple traffic accidents occurred and 56 people were tossed into the water. A 22-foot sailboat was also overturned and was sinking into the ocean. With the associated from Tropical Storm Lidia.
- On February 2, 2019 a microburst hit in Long Beach, California with winds gusting 50 mph as a winter storm, and several trees fell.
- On March 31, 2019, a very destructive downburst cluster with characteristics of a small derecho, but too small to satisfy the criteria, impacted across a 33 km (21 mi) wide and 45 km (28 mi) long swath in the Bara and Parsa Districts, Nepal. Occurring at an elevation of 83 to 109 m (270 to 360 ft) amsl around 18:45 local time, the 30-45 min duration winds flattened many and severely damaged numerous buildings, leading to 28 deaths and hundreds of injuries.
- On June 1, 2019, a relatively short-lived MCS with embedded stronger microbursts formed after morning storms on the west side of Michigan intensified and supercells formed west of Detroit. An area on the west side of Novi and another northwest of West Bloomfield (near Green Lake) were hit especially hard. Wind gusts of 70-80 MPH were estimated in few corridors causing numerous branches, and in some cases, whole trees, to snap. Thousands lost power.
- On June 10, 2019, a microburst with wind speeds of up to 70 mph hit the DFW metroplex, leaving approximately 220,000 people without electricity in Dallas County, damaging many skyscrapers and other buildings, and knocking down around 200 trees.
- On July 6, 2019, a microburst hit Longmeadow, Massachusetts, downing dozens of trees, damaging cars, and houses.
- On August 20, 2019, a microburst hit in the Sevierville, Tennessee area, toppling trees and causing power outages to parts of nearby Pigeon Forge, Tennessee.

=== 2020s ===
- On July 10, 2020, a microburst hit in Eastern Germany.
- On September 28, 2021, a severe convective pulse storm impacted the municipality of Rondonópolis (state of Mato Grosso), in Brazil. 9 power poles were downed.
- On January 17, 2022, a very severe wet downburst produced by a HP supercell, left a wide swath of damage in the municipality of Guaíba (Rio Grande do Sul state), Brazil. Several masonry houses were severely damaged and a large church collapsed. Hundreds of trees were downed and dozens of concrete power poles collapsed. A large brick school had its roof almost fully destroyed, along with some windows. Wind gusts estimated at ≥150 km/h.
- On June 3, 2022, a microburst caused extensive crop damage in Wenona, North Carolina.
- On June 21, 2023, a severe thunderstorm in the Greater Houston area resulted in a powerful downburst. The storm was part of a larger tornado outbreak sequence that occurred from June 20-26, 2023. A record breaking wind gust of 97 mph (156 km/h) was observed at George Bush Intercontinental Airport, surpassing the previous record of 82 mph (132 km/h) recorded during Hurricane Ike in 2008. The aftermath left approximately 324,000 customers without power and caused extensive damage to CenterPoint Energy's equipment and infrastructure. The storm caused significant damage to buildings, with at least 243 homes damaged. The storm was strong enough to flip a small plane and push another off the tarmac at Hooks Airport in northwest Harris County.
- On July 24, 2023, a microburst hit La Chaux-de-Fonds in Western Switzerland with wind gusts of up to 135 mph (217 km/h), caused by a collapsing supercell. One person was killed and 40 people were injured in the event. Roofs were blown off, high-voltage pylons were knocked down and a train derailed. The 135 mph wind gust is one of the strongest ever measured in inhabited areas in Switzerland.
- On November 15, 2023, a heavy downburst impacts Giruá (Rio Grande do Sul). Many schools were severely damaged. 57 injured and 1 fatality recorded.
- On February 13, 2024, a bow-echo produced a very severe downburst over Mirboo North (Victoria), in Australia, during the afternoon after an intense heatwave. Damage up to IF1.5 (≥180 km/h) intensity was documented.
- On June 15, 2024, a macroburst produced heavy damage over São Luiz Gonzaga (Rio Grande do Sul), severely damaging many schools, medical centers, hospitals and many houses. Dozens of trees and power poles were downed.
- On October 12, 2024, a violent downburst impacted the municipality of Três Ranchos (state of Goiás), Brazil. There was significant damage to many roofs and a masonry school was partially destroyed. Health centers were also damaged. One weak brick house collapsed and a gymnasium was completely destroyed. Additionally, many trees and power poles were downed.
- On May 28, 2025, a long track microburst impacted central Austin, Texas, killing one person and leaving 180,000 without power.
- September 9, 2025 - Severe storm with an extremely destructive wet downburst left approximately 8000 homeless people in the brazilian municipality of Brasnorte (Mato Grosso). Dozens of newly built, ceramic-tiled roofs from homes were severely damaged. There were dozens of walls collapsed or destroyed, many trees uprooted and many power poles downed. Masonry walls have collapsed in some buildings.
- July 24, 2026 - A bow echo embedded within a HP supercell produced exceptionally violent downbursts (sequential macrobursts and microbursts) across the municipalities of Taquaritinga, Ribeirão Preto, Jaboticabal, Guariba, and Dumont (all in São Paulo state) during the early hours of July 24. While information remains preliminary, estimates indicate that over 250 concrete utility poles were toppled or snapped, more than 1.300 trees were downed, 54 high-voltage transmission towers (138 kV–500 kV) collapsed, and numerous telecommunications towers were destroyed. Thousands of structures — including hospitals, homes, schools, businesses, industrial facilities, apartments, and high-rises—sustained varying degrees of damage, with many suffering severe impacts. 3-second wind gusts were measured at speeds of at least 160 km/h. One fatality and numerous injuries have been reported.

== See also ==
- List of derecho events
- List of tornadoes and tornado outbreaks
