= 2022 European derecho =

Weather event in Europe

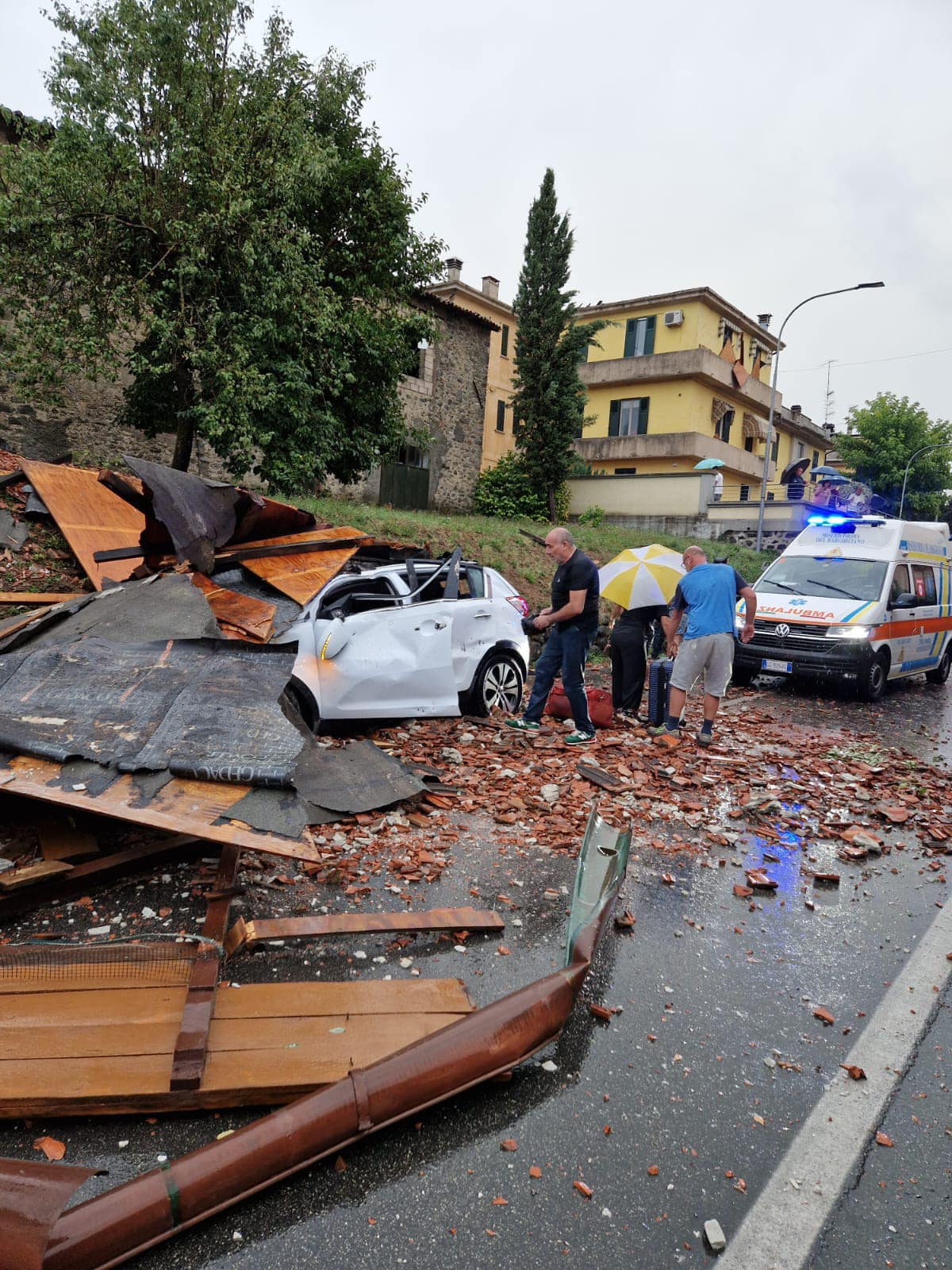
- Storm damage in Barga, Tuscany, Italy
- Date(s): 18 August 2022
- Duration: >12 hours
- Track length: 622 mi (1,000 km)
- Peak wind gust (measured): 139.2 mph (224 km/h; 62.2 m/s)
- Largest hail: 4.33 in (11 cm)
- Fatalities: 12 dead; France (Corsica): 5; Austria: 5; Italy: 2; 116 injuries
- Damage costs: $247 million (2022 USD)
- Types of damage: Widespread damage to residential and commercial property and public utility infrastructure
- Areas affected: Corsica, northern Italy, Austria, Slovenia, southern Czech Republic

The 2022 European derecho was a violent derecho which resulted in strong winds on the French island of Corsica and in parts of northern Italy, Austria, Slovenia, and the southern Czech Republic on 18 August 2022 which traveled over 1,000 kilometres (620 mi). The event resulted in 12 fatalities, and at least 116 others were injured.

== Meteorological history ==
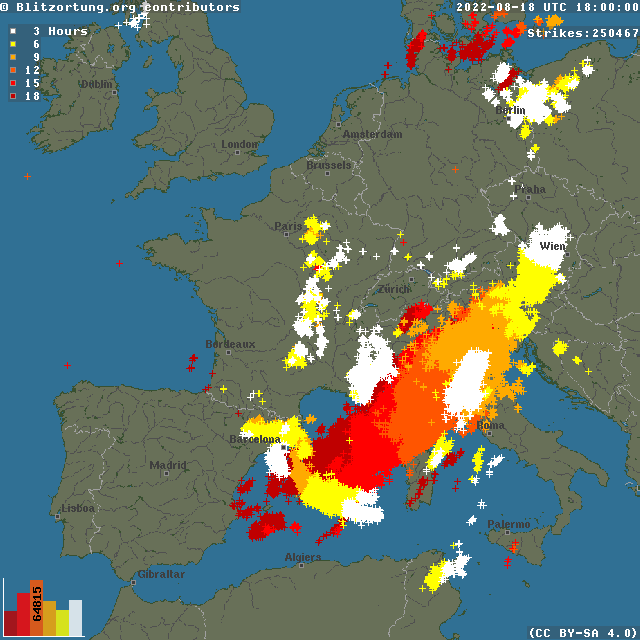
Lightning trace from 00 to 18 UTC showing the derecho track (dark red to white).

A Mesoscale Convective System (MCS) formed during the night from 17 to 18 August over the northern Balearic Islands and then rapidly moved towards the northeast, hitting Corsica early in the morning. The weather radar images show that the line of thunderstorms gradually arched and became a bow echo with the descent of the mid-level jet on the western flank of the MCS, producing powerful gusts of wind at the surface. The system affected Northern Italy afterward and Austria, all within a 12-hour period.

Météo-France was criticized for only triggering an Orange Vigilance by the morning, after the first reports of wind. Even if, according to some specialists, a numerical weather prediction simulation was predicting such an exceptional event, a spokesman for Météo-France defended the organization by saying that not all did because they do not yet represent these very localized phenomena well enough.

== Impact ==
=== Corsica ===
In Corsica, at least five people died and 20 were injured. Four injuries were serious, and 125 water rescues were also required. Winds up to 225 km/h (140 mph) were reported at Marignana, with widespread gusts of 111 km/h (69 mph) (Sari-d'Orcino) to 206 km/h (128 mph) (L'Île-Rousse), including 158 km/h (98 mph) in the capital of Ajaccio.

At one point, it was believed that 350 people were missing, but all have since been found alive. Around 45,000 homes were left without electricity.

=== Northern Italy ===
In Italy, two people were killed by falling trees in Tuscany. At least 41 others were injured in the region. Masonry on the belltower of St Mark's Basilica in Venice was damaged. In Piombino, the wind spun a Ferris wheel out of control, detaching at least one of the empty cabins. Winds gusted as high as 140 kilometres per hour (87 mph).

=== Austria ===
In Austria, five people died and 14 were injured, mostly by falling trees. Winds caused waves to get up to 50 centimetres (1.6 ft), and over 65,000 Austrians lost power.

=== Slovenia ===
In Slovenia, at least four people were injured.

== See also ==
- Weather of 2022
- List of derecho events
