= Mesoscale convective complex =

Type of mesoscale convective system

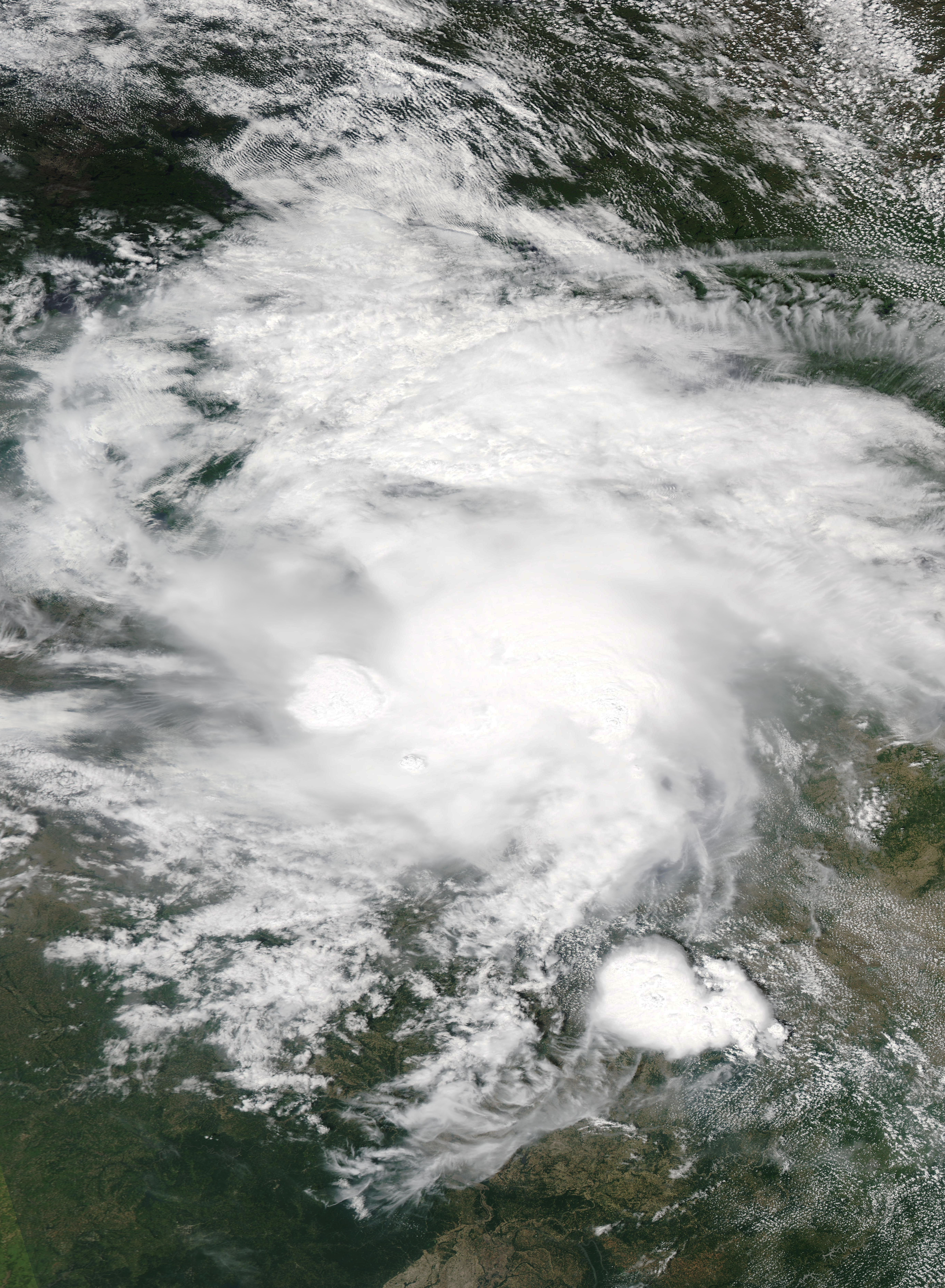
A mesoscale convective complex moving through the Great Lakes region

A mesoscale convective complex (MCC) is a unique kind of thunderstorm mesoscale convective system which is defined by characteristics observed in infrared satellite imagery. They are long-lived, often form nocturnally, and commonly contain heavy rainfall, wind, hail, lightning, and possibly tornadoes.

== Size ==
A mesoscale convective complex has either an area of cloud top of 100,000 km^{2} (39,000 sq mi) or greater with temperature less than or equal to −32 °C (−26 °F), or an area of cloud top of 50,000 km^{2} (19,000 sq mi) with temperature less than or equal to −52 °C (−62 °F). Size definitions must be met for 6 hours or greater. Its maximum extent is defined as when cloud shield reaches maximum area. Its eccentricity (minor axis/major axis) is greater than or equal to 0.7 at maximum extent.

== Development ==
MCCs commonly develop from the merging of thunderstorms into a squall line which eventually meet the MCC criteria. Furthermore, some MCC formation can be tracked from the plains in Colorado back to the Rocky Mountains. These are called orogenic complexes. The characteristics of the meteorological environment that MCCs form in are strong warm air advection into the formation environment by a southerly low-level jet stream (wind maximum), strong moisture advection which increases the relative humidity of the formation environment, convergence of air near the surface, and divergence of air aloft. These conditions are most prominent in the region ahead of an upper level trough.

1. The systems begin in the afternoon as scattered thunderstorms which organize overnight in the presence of wind shear (wind speed and direction changes with height).
2. The probability for severe weather is highest in the early stages of formation, during the afternoon.
3. The MCC persists at its mature and strongest stage overnight and into the early morning in which the rainfall is characterized as stratiform rainfall (rather than convective rainfall which occurs with thunderstorms).
4. Dissipation of the MCC commonly occurs during the morning.

After dissipation, a remnant mid-level circulation known as a mesoscale convective vortex can initiate another round of thunderstorms later in the day.

== Structure ==
The structure of an MCC can be separated into three layers. The low-levels of the MCC near the surface, the mid-levels in the middle of the troposphere, and the upper-levels in the upper-troposphere. Near the surface, the MCC exhibits high pressure, with an outflow boundary, or mesoscale cold front, at its leading edge. This high pressure is caused by the cooling of the air from the evaporation of rainfall (commonly referred to as a cold pool). In the mid-levels (mid-troposphere), the MCC exhibits a cyclonic (counterclockwise in the Northern Hemisphere) rotating low pressure which is warm compared to the surrounding environment (referred to as a warm core). This mid-level circulation is referred to as a Mesoscale Convective Vortex. The upper-levels contain an anti-cyclonic (clockwise in the Northern Hemisphere) rotating high pressure which is a sign of divergence of air. This high pressure is colder relative to its surrounding environment. This divergence at upper-levels and convergence of air at the surface along the cool pool's outflow boundary results in rising motion which aids maintenance of the MCC.

== Effects and climatology ==
MCCs produce heavy rainfall which can lead to flooding and other hydrological impacts. MCCs are found in the United States during the spring and summer months (warm season), the Indian monsoon region, the West Pacific and throughout Africa and South America. In particular, the heavy rainfall from MCCs accounts for a significant portion of the precipitation during the warm season in the United States. As the warm season progresses, the favorable regions for MCC formation shift from the southern plains of the United States northward. By July and August, the north-central states become the most favorable. The mid-level low pressure areas of MCCs have also been tracked to the origin of some tropical cyclones, and on rare occasions, tropical cyclones can generate MCCs.

== Notable MCCs ==
One of the most notable MCCs occurred overnight on 19 July 1977, in western Pennsylvania. The MCC resulted in heavy rainfall which led to the disastrous flooding of Johnstown, Pennsylvania. The complex was tracked 96 hours back to South Dakota and produced copious amounts of rain throughout the northern United States before producing up to 12 inches (300 mm) of rain in Johnstown.

A second notable MCC brought destructive straight-line winds to southern Ontario, Upstate New York, Vermont, Massachusetts, Connecticut, and Rhode Island on the morning of 15 July 1995. The MCC produced winds in excess of 160 km/h (99 mph) and was responsible for seven deaths, widespread destruction of forests in the Adirondack and Berkshire Mountains, and over $500 million in property damage.

The formation of large MCCs over the same general area for a large percentage of the nights between April 1993 and July 1993 and their tendency to persist well into the next day was a large part of the cause for the flooding in much of the central United States that year.

A significant mesoscale convective complex, containing remnant tropical moisture from both the eastern Pacific and Gulf of Mexico, caused catastrophic and deadly flooding in July 2025 in the Texas Hill Country. Over 130 died as a result, including many children attending Camp Mystic along the Guadalupe River.

== See also ==
- Mesoscale convective system
- Supercell
- Tropical cyclone
- Convective storm detection
- Mesoscale convective vortex
- Derecho

== External links and sources ==
- Forecasting MCC's - Hydrometeorological Prediction Center
- MCC description - Pennsylvania State University
- MCC description - University of Illinois
- MCC page - UCAR
- NOAA Glossary
