= I-94 derecho =

Weather event

The I-94 derecho was a progressive derecho that moved through the Upper Mississippi Valley on July 19, 1983. It is so called because the derecho moved through Minnesota and Wisconsin with I-94 as its axis.

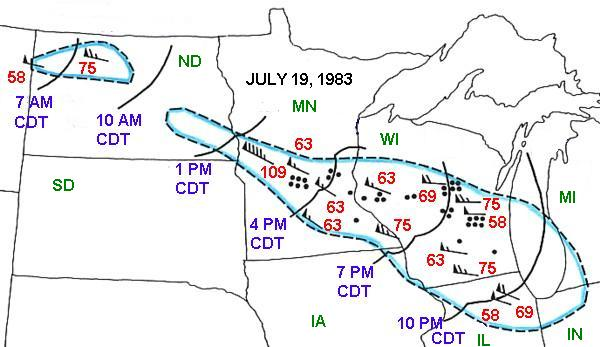
Map of the I-94 Derecho (Courtesy of NOAA)

The derecho formed as an area of disturbed weather in eastern Montana moved eastward. It moved into northwestern North Dakota at around 7 a.m. CDT forming a small bow echo. Williston and Minot reported winds up to 70 miles per hour (110 km/h).

Further development formed two and three bow echo segments as the storm moved into Minnesota. Winds of 100 miles per hour (160 km/h) were recorded at the Alexandria airport. The winds damaged and destroyed hangars. It continued southeast and arrived at Minneapolis, Minnesota at around 4 p.m. CDT and left 250,000 people without power.

Trees were blown over and buildings damaged as the derecho raced through Wisconsin. A meteorologist working at the University of Wisconsin–Madison saw the derecho approach from the southeastern shore of Lake Mendota near Madison, Wisconsin. On the university's campus, the windows were blown out of the second and third stories of the library. Tiles from the roof were blown off and landed several blocks to the southeast. The strong winds resulted in 4 feet (1.2 m) waves on Lake Mendota.

The derecho started moving into northern Illinois at around 9 p.m. CDT. National Weather Service meteorologist Richard Koeneman recorded observations in his weather diary, noting that the evening was "warm and humid", but that the temperature dropped 14 °F (7.8 °C) in 20 minutes (83 to 68 °F (28 to 20 °C) from 9:30 to 9:50 as the derecho passed. He also wrote that the wind had gusted to around 70 miles per hour (110 km/h).

The derecho winds were still strong as it moved into the northwestern side of Chicago. A wind gust of 69 miles per hour (111 km/h) was recorded at O'Hare International Airport. The derecho finally died out over northwestern Indiana at around midnight on July 20.

The storm was responsible for 34 injuries, including 12 from mobile homes being overturned and 8 from falling trees.

== See also ==
- List of derecho events
