= June 2009 Southern Kentucky derecho =

Weather event

The June 16, 2009 storm was an unusually strong derecho containing vivid lightning and spawning several tornadoes. The worst of the damage was primarily in South Central Kentucky.

This large storm system would later be classified as a derecho by the National Weather Service. It was a fast moving storm system moving across Kentucky, west to east, damaging several counties with 90 mph straight line winds in some areas, with heavy rain. There were many warnings issued during the derecho including tornado warnings.

== See also ==
- List of derecho events
