= June 2020 Pennsylvania–New Jersey derecho =

Weather event

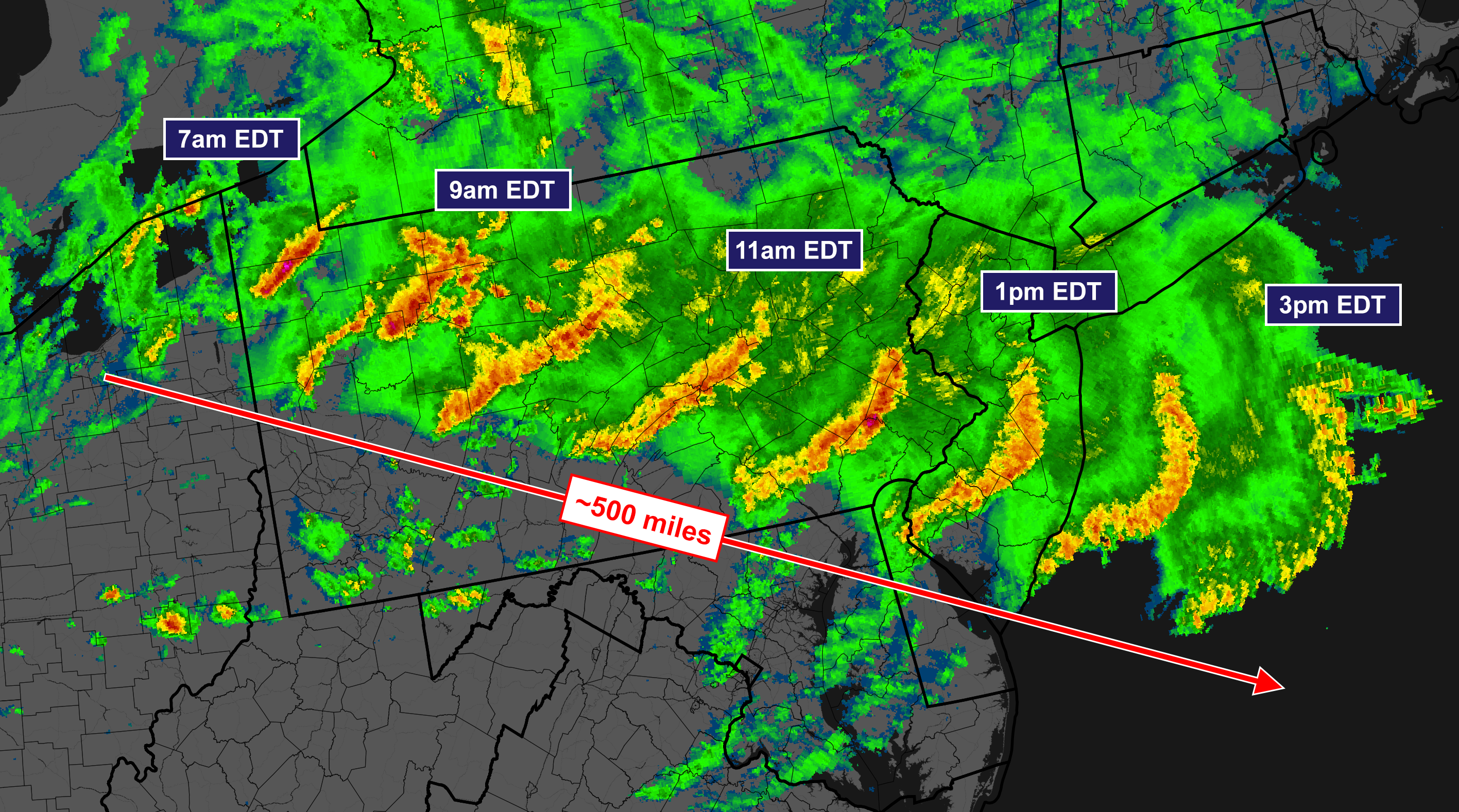
- A radar composite image of the derecho
- Date(s): Wednesday, June 3, 2020
- Track length: 350 mi (563 km)
- Peak wind gust (measured): 93 mph (150 km/h; 41.6 m/s) (Beach Haven, New Jersey)
- Fatalities: 4

On the morning and into the early afternoon of June 3, 2020, a powerful derecho crossed the U.S. states of Pennsylvania and New Jersey, resulting in four fatalities. It was the deadliest derecho event in the region since 1950.

The storms were part of a mesoscale convective system which formed just outside of Oil City, Pennsylvania, and began moving eastward across Lake Erie just after 5 a.m. (EDT). The Storm Prediction Center made its first warning around 8:30 a.m., and damaging wind reports began about 20 minutes later. A severe thunderstorm watch was put into effect in the region just after 10 a.m., as warm, humid temperatures further destabilized the squall line. By the time that the storm crossed the Delaware River into New Jersey, wind speeds were equivalent to those of a Category 1 hurricane. By 2 p.m., the storm had dissipated offshore.

Fallen trees and power lines resulted in four deaths across southeastern Pennsylvania. Wind speeds also resulted in severe property damage from fallen trees, and at least two buildings lost their roofs. Over 850,000 individuals lost electricity due to storm damage, and for many, power was not restored for several days. PECO Energy recruited service crews from outside the region to work on restoring electricity to homes, while drone technology was used to survey the damage. Repairs were slowed by several days of thunderstorms following the initial storm, but by June 6, the severe weather had come to an end.

== Meteorological history ==
A mesoscale convective system that formed just outside of Oil City, Pennsylvania, began moving eastward across Lake Erie around 5:12 a.m. EDT on the morning of June 3, 2020. By 8:32 a.m. EDT, the storm system had moved into northwestern Pennsylvania, and the Storm Prediction Center (SPC) warned that as it progressed and encountered the warmer temperatures in the eastern part of the state, there was a greater threat of severe weather. The first reports of damaging winds emerged twenty minutes later. The SPC issued its first severe thunderstorm watch at 10:05 a.m. EDT, covering an area that stretched from 35 miles (56 km) west-northwest of State College, Pennsylvania, and 30 miles (48 km) southeast of Lakehurst, New Jersey, as well as 60 miles (97 km) north and south. By 10:34 a.m. EDT, the squall line was moving into southeastern Pennsylvania, where the warm, humid temperatures would further destabilize the system.

While there were few damaging wind gusts of 60 mph (97 km/h) or more while the storm moved across western and central Pennsylvania in the morning, the storm intensified by noon. Significant wind damage began as the system entered Berks County, Pennsylvania, and continued through the Philadelphia metropolitan area towards Ocean County, New Jersey. The 83 mph (134 km/h) wind gust measured in Berks was the strongest on record, surpassing the 82 mph (132 km/h) gusts recorded during Hurricane Hazel. Social media footage from the storm showed funnel clouds in Philadelphia and hail in State College, Pennsylvania. The storm crossed the Delaware River around 12:30 p.m. EDT and reached Long Beach Island by 1:15 p.m. The derecho was most severe in Ocean County, New Jersey, where wind speeds were measured at 93 mph (150 km/h) in Beach Haven and 92 mph (148 km/h) in Surf City. By 2 p.m. EDT, the storm had moved off of the New Jersey coast.

Wind speeds reached in New Jersey were equivalent to a Category 1 hurricane, but no hurricane, tropical storm, or tornado was recorded. To be considered a derecho, the National Weather Service states that wind damage must extend at least 240 miles (390 km) and include gusts of at least 58 mph (93 km/h). An early report from climatologist David Robinson inferred that the storm had traveled 350 miles (560 km) in 5 1/2 hours, which would have given it an average speed of 65 mph (105 km/h). Derecho storms are also known for the characteristic bow-like shape of their radar profile The SPC confirmed on the afternoon of June 3 that the storm was classified as a derecho. Meteorologist Lee Robertson believed that the storm was rare even among other derecho events both for its "duration and intensity", particularly the wind speeds of 80 to 90 mph (130 to 140 km/h). The evening before, a ring of fire pattern had settled over most of the contiguous United States. In such a scenario, thunderstorms moving across the ridge of a high-pressure area feed off of both the warm, humid air of the high-pressure region and the adjacent jet stream winds, causing rapidly-intensifying, unpredictable storms. In the days preceding the derecho, that weather pattern had caused damaging thunderstorms in the Midwestern United States.

After the initial derecho passed, the warm weather returned to the region, allowing for more atmospheric destabilization and another set of thunderstorms that evening. Around 3:10 p.m. EDT, an outflow-modified cold front formed over south-central Kentucky, northwest Pennsylvania, and central Ohio, carrying the risk of isolated wind gusts, hail, and scattered thunderstorms. A second severe thunderstorm watch was issued for the Mid-Atlantic region at 3:50 p.m. EDT, covering an area 5 miles (8.0 km) north-northwest of State College to 15 miles (24 km) east-northeast of Atlantic City, New Jersey, and extending 40 miles (64 km) north and south, respectively. Bill Bunting of the SPC characterized the later thunderstorms by their "strobe-like lightning, and prolonged thunder that evoked an oceanic roar", and the rains were heavier in the later, slower storm than they had been for the faster derecho. The evening storm also caused damage in areas of New Jersey, including Beach Haven, Hammonton, Folsom, Port Republic, and Mullica Township. A tornado warning was issued in southern New Jersey and southeastern Pennsylvania at 7:15 p.m. and expired 30 minutes later. At 8:30 p.m., The Philadelphia Inquirer reported that there had been no confirmed tornado reports in the region. In Carlisle, Pennsylvania, which had avoided damage from the initial derecho, a microburst (a sudden strong, spreading downdraft) later in the evening caused extensive damage to trees and power lines. The remaining storms dissipated offshore by 10 p.m. EDT, concluding the severe weather for the day.

== Impact ==
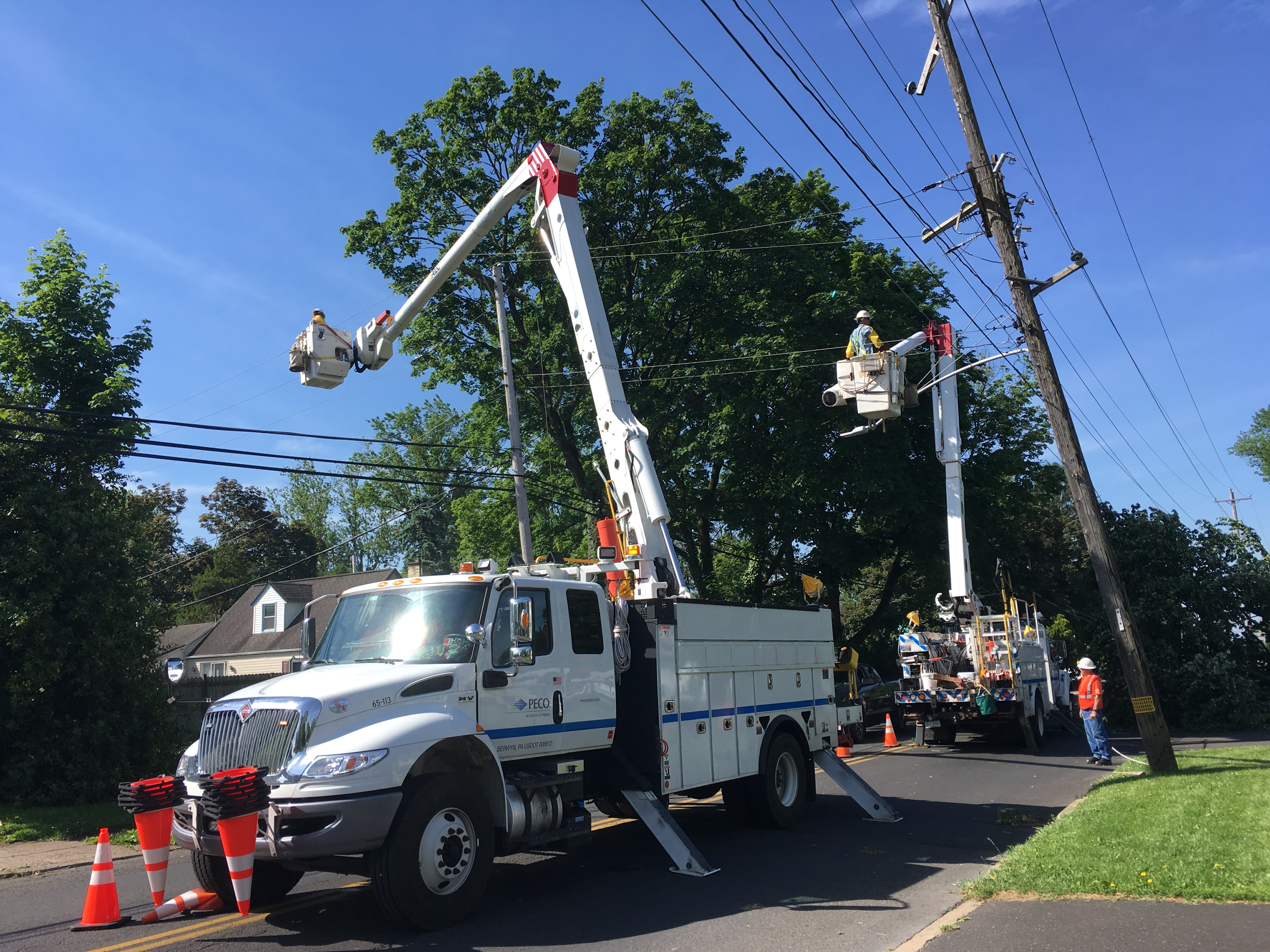
PECO Energy Company vehicles repair damaged power lines caused by the derecho in Hatboro, Pennsylvania.

The June 2020 derecho was the first to impact the Pennsylvania–New Jersey region since June 2012, when a storm moved east from Iowa into southern Pennsylvania. Four fatalities were associated with the derecho, making it the deadliest such storm in the region since 1950. In Belmont Hills and Penn Wynne, Pennsylvania, respectively, two individuals were killed when trees fell onto the roofs of their cars. In Lower Moreland Township, the 38-year-old director of golf at Philmont Country Club was killed when a tree collapsed into the building where he had been working. The fourth fatality occurred in Delaware County, where derecho winds topped live overhead power lines into a home, causing the building to catch fire. A second individual inside the house escaped.

In addition to human death and injury, the derecho caused extensive property damage as trees were uprooted from the ground, landing on and crushing homes and vehicles. The National Weather Service office in Mount Holly, New Jersey, logged over 250 wind damage reports in the region resulting from the derecho, most resulting from felled trees and downed power lines, some of which collapsed on buildings and residences. Most of the damage was concentrated in a stretch from Reading, Pennsylvania, to Philadelphia, with areas such as the Lehigh Valley spared the brunt of the storm. In Lansdale, Pennsylvania, the storm removed the roof from a 150-unit apartment building, leaving the complex uninhabitable. A report from the Montgomery County board of commissioners also stated that the storm had caused several serious fires in the region. On Long Beach Island, the St. Francis Community Center also lost part of its roof to derecho winds.

The storm also caused massive power outages in southeastern Pennsylvania and New Jersey. More than 850,000 individuals lost electricity on June 3, including 200,000 in New Jersey. Several long-term care facilities in Montgomery County, Pennsylvania lost electricity and utilized emergency generators to protect the residents. The following day, around 100,000 homes and businesses in New Jersey remained without power. Most of the outages were located in Burlington and Camden County, New Jersey. In Pennsylvania, over 56,000 individuals remained without power on June 5. Although the number dwindled to 16,500 on Sunday, June 6, PECO Energy received several complaints from those individuals about their lack of electricity during a period of high temperatures, as well as the company's delayed time frames for when their electricity might be restored. PECO Energy recruited service crews from states including Oklahoma, Illinois, Florida, and New Hampshire to undertake repairs and restorations. PECO, who had been using drone technology for several months prior to the storm but had been seeking opportunities to incorporate the technology into storm restoration, used their drones to assess damage aerially at speeds that would have been much slower from the ground. All power was restored by June 9.

== Aftermath ==
Repairing the damage caused by the derecho was inhibited by additional severe thunderstorms in the following days. The National Weather Service and local meteorologists warned that "several rounds of progressive thunderstorm complexes" would extend through the Lehigh Valley until the storm front was displaced by an east-to-west boundary on June 6. On June 4, the NWS warned that another round of thunderstorms would move through central Pennsylvania after 4 p.m. EDT, continuing through the night with a possibility of flooding. A loose series of storms passed through New Jersey that afternoon, dissipating just after midnight. Areas of Middlesex and Monmouth County were placed under a coastal flood advisory from 6 p.m. to midnight, with the NWS predicting up to 1 foot (0.30 m) of flooding above ground level.

Another round of slow-moving thunderstorms passed through the region on June 5, with most of New Jersey and southeastern Pennsylvania placed under a flash flood watch. Areas of northern Delaware and Maryland were also placed under watch. Unlike the wind damage caused by the derecho, heavy rainfall provided a greater threat for this later day of severe weather. Thunderstorms passed over the region between 3 and 10 p.m. EDT, with places like Wall Township, New Jersey, receiving 4.24 inches (108 mm) of rain in one day, more than the town's usual monthly total of 3.98 inches (101 mm) of June precipitation. Flooding was reported in Pennsylvania as well, particularly around the Schuylkill Expressway, Route 202 in Chester County, and around the Delaware River, where a flood advisory was triggered. The severe weather in the Pennsylvania–New Jersey area abated by the weekend of June 6, with temperatures leveling out at around 80 °F (27 °C) and with no storms.

== See also ==
- List of derecho events
- New York State Labor Day derechos
- August 2020 Midwest derecho
