= Summer of 2012 derecho series =

Series of weather events

During the summer of 2012, a series of severe wind events associated with powerful thunderstorms, known as derechos, affected widespread areas of the United States. The first of these derechos occurred in late June, and caused power outages that affected nearly five million people. Three weaker derechos occurred in July, and a final derecho disrupted activities in Chicago, Illinois in early August. Only three tornadoes were reported in conjunction with the derechos.

== June 29–30 event ==
On June 29, a powerful derecho with wind gusts over 90 mph began in Chicago and moved all the way to the east coast, causing massive damage in the billions of dollars. Damage affected large population centers such as Fort Wayne, Indiana, Columbus, Ohio, Charleston, West Virginia, Roanoke, Virginia, Richmond, Virginia, Washington, DC, Kentucky, and Atlantic City, New Jersey. This was the first of three derechos to affect west-central Ohio.

== July 2 event ==
On July 2, a much less long-lived derecho moved due south from Kentucky through Tennessee over about 300 miles. It was about as wide as its track was long.

== July 24 event ==
On July 24, a very small derecho moved through Chicago (the second in four weeks) through Indiana, western Ohio (the second of three in four weeks), and down into Kentucky where its damage path broke up.

== July 26 event ==
The fourth derecho in four weeks struck much of the eastern US on July 26 as a cold front brought the necessary conditions for a serial derecho. This began over Lake Erie, and spread rapidly to the northeast and southwest as it made landfall in northern Ohio and Pennsylvania. Several bow echos developed separately, even taking on the characteristics of multiple single-bow derechos, before all of the segments connected into a line echo wave pattern, the classic shape of a multi-bow serial derecho on radar. Notably, it was the fourth to hit the US within four weeks, and some areas such as Dayton, Ohio experienced three derechos within this span, where on average they receive only one derecho per year. Remnants of the derecho continued to produce isolated severe weather across the eastern US overnight. Five people were injured as a result of the storm.

== August 4 event ==
On August 4, a derecho traveled 300 miles from east Iowa to Ohio, disrupting the Lollapallooza festival in Chicago. There were over 150 reports of wind damage from this storm, with five reports of hurricane-force winds (more than 74 mph) and a tornado. The derecho narrowly missed the same west-central Ohio area which was struck by three derechos within four weeks from the end of June to the end of July.

== See also ==
- Summer 2012 North American heat wave
- 2012 North American drought
