= New York State Labor Day derechos =

Derecho events in New York state

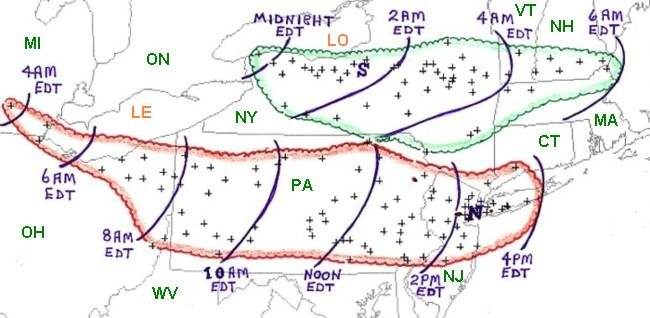
- Map of the Labor Day Derechos (courtesy of NOAA).
- Date(s): September 7, 1998
- Duration: 6-12
- Peak wind gust (measured): 89 mph (143 km/h; 39.8 m/s) (Greater Rochester International Airport)
- Tornado count: 4 (Lynbrook, New York)
- Strongest tornado^{1}: F2 tornado
- Fatalities: 7 (80 injured)
- Damage costs: >$131 million
- Areas affected: Northeast United States
- ^{1}Most severe tornado damage; see Fujita scale

The New York State Labor Day derechos were two derecho events that occurred on Labor Day, September 7, 1998. One derecho moved through northern and central New York state, and the other would start in southeastern Michigan and move through northeastern Ohio, Pennsylvania, New Jersey, and Long Island. A spokesman for the New York State Emergency Management Office, estimated that 300,000 residences had lost electricity, 7 people died and 80 were injured.

== Syracuse Labor Day derecho ==
NEXRAD radar animation of the Syracuse Labor Day derecho

The northernmost derecho (dubbed the Syracuse Labor Day Derecho and referred to locally as the Labor Day Storm), got its start in northwestern New York just before midnight on September 7 after several thunderstorm cells coming from Ontario converged to become a bow echo. It quickly moved southeastward through New York.

=== Impacts ===
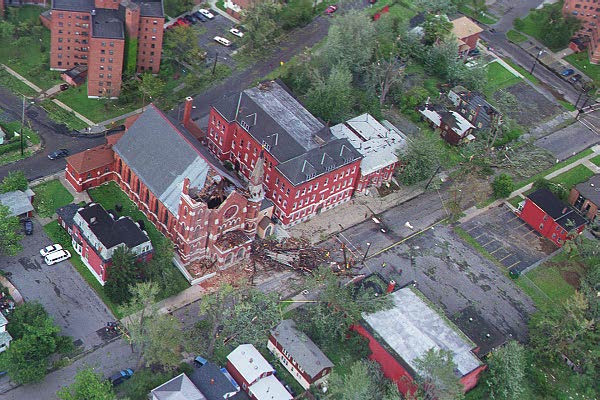
Aerial view of St. Lucy’s Catholic church on the west side of Syracuse after the Derecho.

Some of the worst damage occurred at Rochester, Syracuse, and Utica. Three people were killed, two of them at the New York State Fairgrounds in Syracuse. Governor George Pataki declared nine counties in that region to be in a state of emergency, which meant that the state would provide financial and other resources to those counties if help was requested.

An 89 miles per hour (143 km/h) wind gust was recorded at the Greater Rochester International Airport and a 77 miles per hour (124 km/h) gust was recorded at Syracuse Hancock International Airport. Winds peaked at an estimated 115 mph (185 km/h) by radars.

Tens of thousands of trees were blown down. Embedded within this derecho was a supercell thunderstorm, which produced an extensive damage path from the Syracuse area, through the northern suburbs of Albany, and into western Vermont. Lightning with this particular storm was reported by many in its path as extreme, creating twilight conditions in Rochester, and daylight conditions on its rampage down the Mohawk Valley. The constant lightning was striking as many as 10–20 times per second. Damage was estimated at $130 million.

Many in the region were without electricity for over a week. Many people had to go to temporary shelters because of damage to their homes. The St. Lucy Catholic church on the west side of Syracuse had one of their steeples ripped off the building.

== New York City Labor Day derecho ==
Radar loop of the derecho through PA, NY, NJ and CT.

As the Syracuse Derecho moved into New England, a new derecho started developing in southeastern Michigan at around 4 A.M. EDT and followed a track just to the south of the first one. The derecho raced through northeastern Ohio and Pennsylvania, New Jersey and ended up in New York in the mid-afternoon hours.

=== Impacts ===
Four people were killed and 62 were injured, mainly in the New Jersey and the New York City area, but damage also extended east to Long Island and Southwestern Connecticut. Damage was particularly heavy in Union County, where the towns of Plainfield, Cranford, Clark and Rahway declared a state of emergency, imposed overnight curfews and postponed the opening day of school. Four small tornadoes were spawned by this storm, including an F2 tornado in Lynbrook, New York, that caused 6 injuries and $1 million in damage.

Officials said that some 19,500 customers in the city and Westchester County were without power, roughly 71,500 on Long Island, 77,000 in New Jersey, and 10,000 in southern Connecticut. Thousands of trees were blown down and about 100 boats were overturned. A six-person air-sea rescue team from the Police Department's Aviation Unit, based at Floyd Bennett Field in Brooklyn had to respond to numerous emergency calls.

== See also ==
- List of derecho events
