= Heat wave of 1995 derecho series =

Weather event

The heat wave of 1995 derecho series are a series of derechos that occurred from Tuesday, July 11 through Saturday, July 15, 1995, primarily impacting areas from Montana to the US Midwest, and the Great Lakes Region.

== Synopsis ==
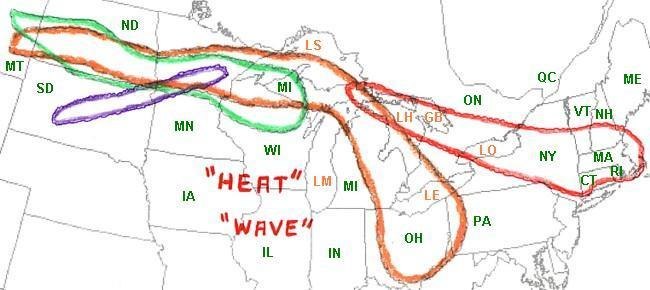
Map of the four derechos of the July 1995 Derecho Event (courtesy of NOAA)

A tremendously hot and humid air mass over the Great Plains contributed to the development of four powerful derechos. These particular derechos occurred during the heat wave of 1995. The derechos developed along the northern rim of the air mass on a stationary front.

- The first derecho (shown in green) started in Montana during the evening of July 11 and dissipated over northern Michigan and northern Wisconsin during the morning hours on July 12.
- The second, and the longest lived, of the derecho series (shown in orange) started in Montana on July 12 following the same path as the first and moved into northern Michigan on the morning of the 13th. It moved south and hit eastern Michigan and southwestern Ontario before dissipating over southern Ohio and extreme northern West Virginia at around midnight on July 14.
- The third (shown in purple) began developing in southwestern central South Dakota in the late evening hours of July 13. It moved northeast through Minnesota on the 14th. For some residents of northern Minnesota, this is the third day in a row they have been hit by a derecho.
- The fourth and final derecho of this series (shown in red), started over upper Michigan on the evening of July 14 and moved east through southern and eastern Ontario, continuing east through western and eastern New York State in the early morning hours on the 15th. Wind damage was particularly heavy in the Adirondack Mountains region of upstate New York. The derecho moved into the waters of the Atlantic Ocean in the mid-afternoon hours that same day where it dissipated quickly.

== The "Right Turn Derecho" of July 12 and 13 ==
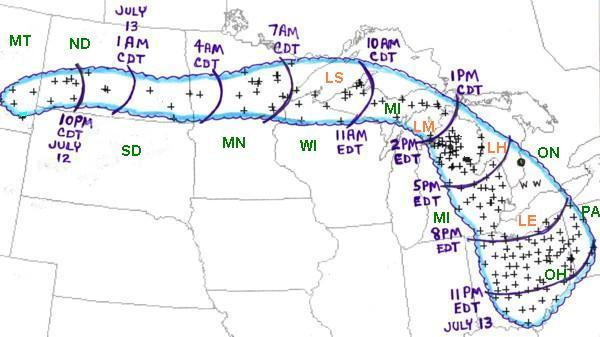
Map of the Right Turn Derecho (courtesy of NOAA)

This derecho raced through eight states in 24 hours: Montana, North Dakota, Minnesota, Wisconsin, Michigan, Ohio and parts of Pennsylvania and West Virginia as well as one Canadian province, Ontario. This was termed a 'right turn' derecho because its initial eastward progression moved sharply to a south-southeast direction, having developed from a band of thunderstorms in Montana. Hector International Airport in Fargo, North Dakota recorded a 91 mph wind gust. This was the second day of three that Minnesota suffered hits from derecho winds—five million trees were blown down and buildings were damaged or destroyed, and six campers were injured by falling trees in the early morning hours.

The derecho moved south and southeast during the afternoon hours and blew more trees down. Three people were killed and several injuries occurred in eastern Michigan. In Roscommon County, 100,000 trees and 100 miles of power lines were blown down. In Detroit, 400,000 people lost power. It was the biggest power loss for the city since the July 7, 1991 derecho event. The power loss only added to what might have been a very uncomfortable situation. As previously mentioned, Detroit was in a massive heat wave. Luckily, the heat was mitigated by cooling from rain.

The derecho wreaked havoc in southwestern Ontario, hundreds of trees fell and damage was caused to buildings. When the derecho crossed Lake Erie, the storm capsized many boats and one man was killed.

The derecho moved into Ohio and felled thousands of more trees. Three more people were killed and several more were injured. The derecho finally dissipated near the Ohio River at midnight on July 14.

Amazingly, this was not the only major heat wave of July 1995. At the end of the month and the beginning of August, another major heat wave spread across the country. An example of this was the 128 degrees Fahrenheit temperature registered on July 28 in Indio, California.

== The Ontario–Adirondacks Derecho of July 14 and 15 ==
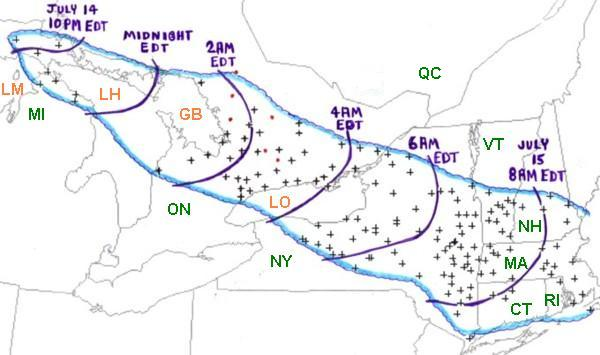
Map of the Ontario-Adirondacks Derecho (courtesy of NOAA)

The Ontario–Adirondacks Derecho got its start near the straits of Mackinac on Friday evening July 14, 1995. At the Mackinac Bridge connecting the Upper and Lower Peninsulas of Michigan, 100 mph winds were detected and sustained winds above 80 mph continued on the bridge for 10 additional minutes. After crossing the open waters of Lake Huron/Georgian Bay, the storm raced southeastward into central southern Ontario. Several brief tornadoes were reported. An F1 tornado struck the Balsam Lake Trailer Park near Kirkfield, flipping over vehicles, destroying several trailers and sending ten people to hospital with non life-threatening injuries. One trailer was thrown over 250 meters. Across the lake from the trailer park, straightline winds caused extensive damage in the cottage community of Long Point. Further east, near Peterborough, an F2 tornado hit Bridgenorth damaging or destroying 20 homes and a marina with winds estimated upward of 200 km/h (120 mp/h). To get an idea of the straight line wind damage over a wide area, a sustained wind gust of 136 km/h (84 mp/h) was recorded just north of Toronto at the Buttonville Airport, which was located on the far southern periphery of the main derecho.

Many thousands of trees were blown down across the province severing power lines, blocking roadways, and damaging homes. One person was killed, and dozens of people were injured. Eight people trapped in a flipped houseboat in Pigeon Lake near Peterborough were rescued hours after the storm. Power was not restored to some affected areas for up to a week after the event. The derecho caused CAN$53 million in damage.

The storm entered New York state at around 4 A.M. The storm slammed into the Adirondacks felling 900,000 acres (3,600 km^{2}) of forest. The value of the loss of timber was estimated at over $200 million (1995 dollars) ($306M in 2014 dollars)

The derecho passed through the Syracuse airport with a 76 mph wind gust. A parked Boeing 727 was blown into another plane. A 77 mph wind gust was recorded at Albany. It moved into New England a little after sunrise producing 70–90 mph wind gusts in several towns in Massachusetts. Fifty people were left homeless after the derecho blew the roof off an apartment building in Holyoke, Massachusetts. Three people were injured in Deerfield, Massachusetts when a hot air balloon got caught into the winds of the derecho gust front and blew into a tree.

During the July 15, 1995 derecho, over 600 lightning strikes were observed in a 10-minute period during the storms peak intensity. 600 lightning strikes in 10 minutes translates into 60 strikes a minute or one strike every second. A Lightning Detection System (LDS) displayed flash rates of 3000 strokes per hour. Satellite photography depicted expanding cloud tops to 75,000 feet.

The Ontario–Adirondacks Derecho was the strongest of the derecho events of the previous days and is among the costliest thunderstorms in US/Canadian history. It caused $500 millions in damage. Altogether, the four derecho events caused nearly $1 billion in damage.

== See also ==
- List of derecho events
