= Independence Day Derecho of 1977 =

Weather event

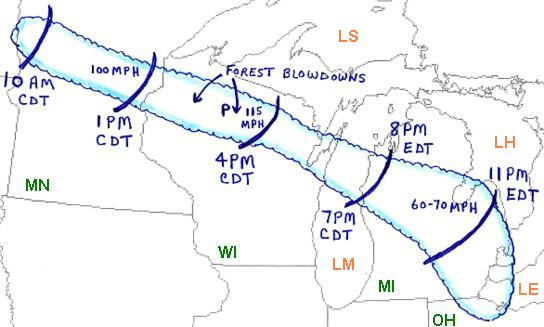
- Track of the Independence Day Derecho of 1977
- Date(s): July 4, 1977
- Peak wind gust (measured): 115 mph (185 km/h; 51.4 m/s) (Rhinelander, Wisconsin)

The Independence Day Derecho of 1977 was a derecho, or long-lived windstorm associated with a fast-moving band of thunderstorms, that swept across the Great Lakes region of the U.S. on July 4, 1977. It lasted around 15½ hours. The derecho formed in western Minnesota around 10 a.m. CDT on July 4 and became more intense around noon in the central part of the state. The derecho produced winds of 80–100 mph (130–160 km/h) in northern Wisconsin, felling thousands of trees.

== Wisconsin ==
As the storm raced through Burnett, Washburn, Sawyer, Price, and Oneida counties, it caused a band of damage 10–20 miles (16–32 km) wide. Nearly 850,000 acres (3,400 km^{2}) of forest were badly damaged or destroyed. The derecho caused $24M in property damage. One person was killed and 35 were injured.

Here is a summary of damage by county:

- Sawyer County, Wisconsin - A wind gust of 75 mph (121 km/h) was measured at the Hayward airport. The downburst winds destroyed several homes and barns. Winds of 135 mph (217 km/h) were estimated at the Flambeau River State Forest. A child was killed when a tree fell on her camper at Connors Lake. Nearby, an area of old-growth forest was almost completely destroyed.
- Price County, Wisconsin - The storm continued to damage several homes and injured 20 people. The gust front reached Phillips around 2:55 p.m. CDT and the severe winds lasted for 25 minutes. An anemometer at the airport registered a 100 mph (160 km/h) wind gust. All the homes in the Phillips area were damaged. Thirty were damaged beyond repair.
- Oneida County, Wisconsin - The derecho continued to damage homes and blow down large areas of forest. The gust front entered Rhinelander around 3:30 p.m. CDT. A wind speed of 115 mph (185 km/h) was recorded at the airport. Seven people were injured in this county. The severe winds continued through northeastern Wisconsin and across Lake Michigan.

== Michigan ==
The derecho was not nearly as strong in Michigan as it was in Wisconsin. Many trees blew over and caused damage to homes and buildings as it moved into Manistee and Ludington. The storm spawned tornadoes as it moved into central Lower Michigan and two people were injured—one from an overturned mobile home and another from an overturned camper.

The derecho moved through Lower Michigan throughout the afternoon and evening before dissipating in northern Ohio around 1:30 a.m. EDT on July 5. A total of one million acres (4,000 km^{2}) of forest were damaged or destroyed, and the storm caused a total of $30M damage (1977 dollars).

== Bow Echo discovered ==
After the storm, Dr. T. Theodore Fujita became aware of the extreme wind damage over northern Wisconsin and decided to conduct an investigation. He noticed that there were three areas of extreme damage from northeastern Minnesota to extreme northwestern Wisconsin, and then two more areas of forest blowdowns extending from Hayward to Rhinelander.

He then went back and looked at the radar echos, and he noticed that they evolved into a bow signature. It was during this investigation that Dr Fujita discovered the bow or spearhead radar echo.

== See also ==
- List of derecho events
