= Southern Great Lakes Derecho of 1991 =

Weather event

The Southern Great Lakes Derecho of 1991 is the derecho event that occurred on July 7 and 8, 1991. It lasted 17 hours and raced from southeast South Dakota through southern Michigan before dying out over Western Pennsylvania.

== South Dakota ==
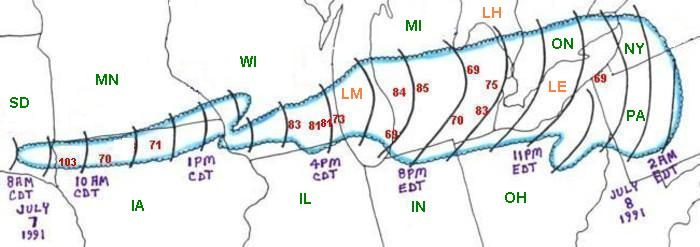
Map of the Southern Great Lakes Derecho of 1991 (courtesy of NOAA)

This derecho started in southeastern South Dakota at around 8 A.M. CDT.

== Iowa ==
The derecho moved into northern Iowa causing more damage. Thousands of acres of corn and soybean crops were flattened causing $60 million in damage (1991 dollars).The strongest wind gust—103 mph (170 km/h) -- was recorded at Sioux Center, Iowa. A school's roof was blown off in Orange City.

A gust of 71 mph was recorded at Mason City airport. There was also major damage inside the city. A woman was killed in McIntosh Woods State Park when a tree fell on her.

== Wisconsin ==
As this derecho moved into Wisconsin in the early afternoon hours, it died out and a new derecho quickly developed. The derecho quickly gained in size and was once again causing damage. Thirty farm buildings were destroyed and over 250 were damaged over southern Wisconsin. In Waukesha, Wisconsin, a 300-year-old Dunbar Oak tree was toppled. Dane, Jefferson, Waukesha, Washington, and Ozaukee counties were declared Federal Disaster Areas by FEMA.

== Southern Michigan ==
The derecho entered southern Michigan at around 6:30 P.M. EDT. It would move at up to 60 mph, and knock out power to nearly 853,000 customers. Up to this time this would be the largest number of customers in Michigan to lose power from the same storm system. For some customers it would take up to a week for the power to be restored.

An 84 mph (133 km/h) wind gust was reported at Grand Rapids, Michigan and at Belding, Michigan. A semi-trailer was blown over on I-69 near Marshall.

Also, an F1 tornado touched down in Rochester, Michigan.

== Southwestern Ontario ==
After crossing lower Michigan, the derecho moved into the Windsor area of Ontario around 9:30pm EDT. Many electrical lines were blown down and a number of roofs were damaged. A tornado touched down near Stratford and numerous funnel clouds were reported.

== Demise ==
The bow echo system then crossed over Lake Erie and dissipated over Western Pennsylvania (including metro Pittsburgh) at around 2 A.M. EDT on July 8.

The Southern Great Lakes Derecho of 1991 traveled about 1,000 miles (1,600 km) in 17 hours, caused $100 million in damage (1991 dollars), cut off electrical power to nearly 1 million customers, killed 1 and injured about 12 others.

== See also ==
- List of derecho events
