= 2020 Midwest derecho =

Powerful wind storm in U.S. Midwest

August 2020 Midwest Derecho
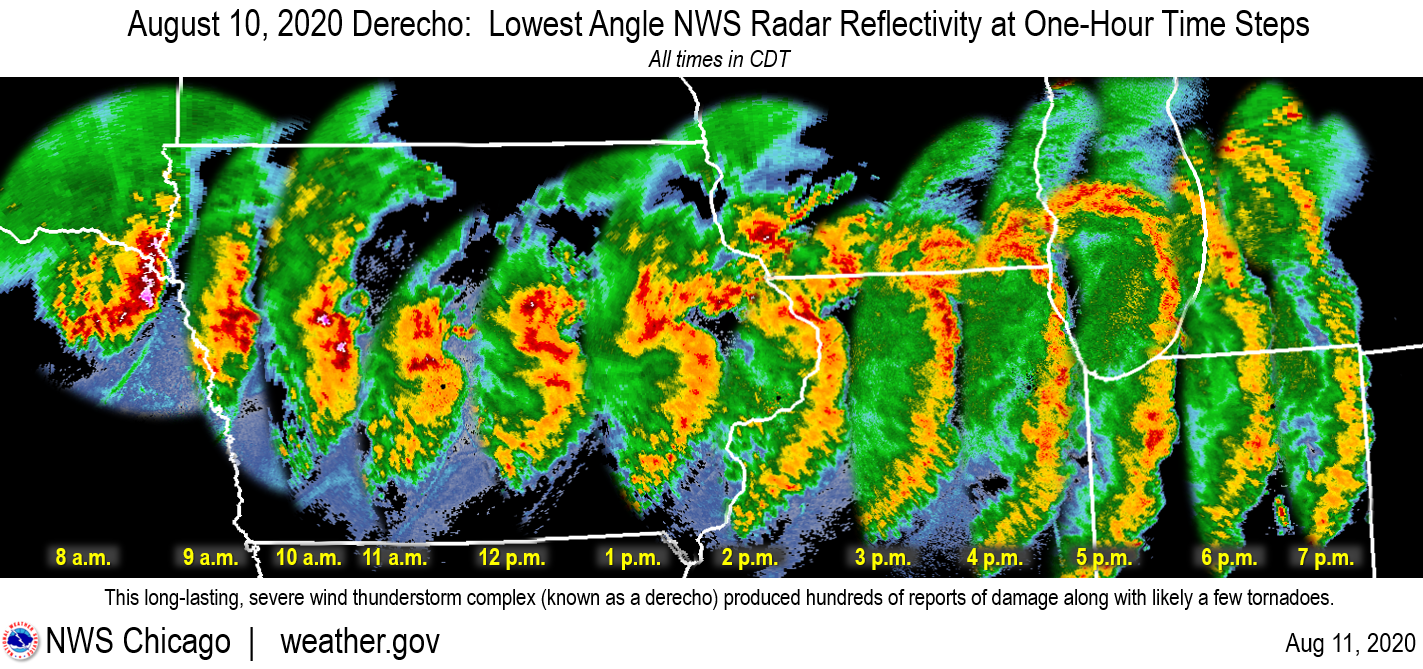
- August 10 radar composite from 8am to 7pm CDT
- Date(s): August 10, 2020; 6 years ago
- Duration: 14 hours
- Track length: 770 mi (1,240 km)
- Peak wind gust (measured): 126 mph (203 km/h; 56.3 m/s) (Atkins, Iowa, United States)
- Peak wind gust (est.): 140 mph (225 km/h; 62.6 m/s) (Cedar Rapids, Iowa)
- Largest hail: 2 in (5.1 cm) (Freeport, Illinois)
- Tornado count: 26
- Strongest tornado^{1}: EF1 tornado
- Fatalities: 4
- Damage costs: $11.2 billion (2020 USD) Costliest on record for a thunderstorm event
- Types of damage: Widespread damage to residential and commercial property, agriculture, and public utility infrastructure, some severe, affecting millions.
- Areas affected: Midwestern United States State Breakdown: Significantly Affected; South Dakota (SE); Nebraska (NE); Iowa; Illinois; Wisconsin (S); Indiana (N); Lesser Affected; Missouri (N); Michigan (SW); Ohio (NW); Kentucky (N)
- Severest impact: Cedar Rapids, Iowa area
- ^{1}Most severe tornado damage; see Enhanced Fujita scale

NOAA satellite imagery of the derecho passing over the Midwest

The 2020 Midwest derecho was an unusually destructive and extremely powerful progressive derecho that devastated much of the Midwestern United States, primarily eastern Nebraska, Iowa, Illinois, Wisconsin, and Indiana. It caused high winds and spawned an outbreak of weak tornadoes. Some areas reported torrential rain and large hail. The event came with no prior warning as weather forecast did not show the possibility of a derecho occurring until it was already in progress.

Damage was moderate to severe across much of the affected area, as sustained wind speeds of 70 miles per hour (110 kilometers per hour; 31 meters per second) were prevalent. The greatest damage occurred in eastern Iowa, and northern Illinois, where multiple tornadoes touched down. The highest winds occurred in Iowa, measured at 126 mph (203 km/h; 56.3 m/s) (Note: Equivalent to an EF2 tornado or Category 3 hurricane) and highest estimated from post-event damage surveys at 140 mph (225 km/h; 62.6 m/s). (Note: Equivalent to an EF3 tornado or Category 4 hurricane)

Millions across the Midwest were affected by wide-scale utility disruptions, residential and commercial property damage, and severe damage to corn and soybean crops. Cedar Rapids, Iowa, was the most severely damaged, suffering a near-complete blackout that lasted for weeks in some areas, widespread and severe property damage, and an estimated loss of at least half of the city's tree canopy. The derecho caused over $11 billion (2020 USD) in damages and spawned a years-long cleanup effort.

== Meteorological history ==
Weather radar imagery of the storm moving across the Midwest

Derechos of similar intensity to the August 2020 storm impact the Midwestern U.S. roughly once per decade, with similar derechos having occurred in 1998 and 2011. As with derechos in general, the continuous downwelling of high winds associated with the nearby jet stream and the expansion of dense rain-cooled air in the storm's wake induced the destructive winds and the storm's motion. However, the August 2020 derecho was unusual for the longevity of the damaging winds it produced; some areas were subjected to these winds for up to an hour compared to the 10–20 minutes of sustained damaging winds in a typical derecho, resulting in conditions similar to the passage of a hurricane's eyewall. Media outlets described the storm as an "inland hurricane." On average, the storm front traveled west-to-east at an average speed of 55 mph (88.5 km/h; 24.6 m/s). A combination of strong ambient winds and extreme convective instability facilitated the strength and unusual characteristics of the derecho. The latter factor resulted from the conducive overlapping of moist air drawn northward across the Mississippi Valley and warm and dry air aloft originating from the Southwestern U.S., resulting in an elevated mixed layer that allowed instability to escalate. These convectively unstable conditions permeated across Iowa and were characterized by steep lapse rates in the mid-levels of the troposphere as sampled via weather balloon launches from Omaha, Nebraska, on the morning of August 10, and from Davenport, Iowa, at noon that day; the atmospheric sounding retrieved from the Davenport balloon launch observed lapse rates of 8.5 °C/km. The warm front demarcating the northward push of the unstable air also focused the development of storms across the region.

Prior to August 10, the Storm Prediction Center (SPC) and the local offices of the National Weather Service (NWS) did not anticipate a storm of exceptional magnitude. Predictive weather models also yielded inaccurate projections of the storm and continued to do so even on the day of the event. On August 3, the SPC noted in a Convective Outlook that a series of shortwave troughs was forecast to move through northern portions of the U.S. in the coming days, becoming possible impetuses for thunderstorm development leading up to and on August 10. (Note: The Convective Outlook is a bulletin regularly issued by the Storm Prediction Center highlighting risk areas for severe weather in the continental U.S. Individual outlooks concern severe weather potential within one, two, three, or eight days of the bulletin's issuance.) Three days before the event, the SPC assessed a Marginal Risk of severe weather for a swath of the central U.S. extending from northern Kansas to southern Michigan, including parts of southern Iowa, northern Missouri, and northern Illinois. The risk level was elevated to a Slight Risk at midnight on August 10 prior to the onset of the damaging storms. However, the slight risk area did not include any part of Iowa; it instead covered a narrow corridor from central Kansas northeastward into north-central Missouri. Parts of Iowa remained under either a Marginal risk or a general non-severe thunderstorm risk; northwestern Iowa was removed from all thunderstorm risk areas entirely. While the 0100 UTC outlook did include Marginal and Slight risk for this area overnight through the early morning hours of August 10, any storms that formed were expected to be mainly be elevated and produce large hail with the possibility of damaging winds being less certain. Temperatures and dew points were between 70–80 °F (21–27 °C) across the Midwestern U.S. around dawn on the morning of August 10. Winds blowing from the west were juxtaposed atop near-surface winds blowing from the southwest and south, resulting in strong wind shear over the region. The derecho began as a cluster of scattered thunderstorms that had formed during the previous night over south-central South Dakota. These storms tracked east along the South Dakota–Nebraska border and became better organized and coalesced, producing hail with diameters between 1–2 in (25–51 mm) and wind gusts between 60–70 mph (97–113 km/h) over a narrow swath. In response to these developments, the SPC issued a special Convective Outlook at 8:00 a.m., highlighting a now Enhanced Risk of severe weather for areas in the storms' path including Cedar Rapids, Iowa, the Quad Cities metropolitan area, and Peoria, Illinois. According to the SPC, there was a 30 percent likelihood of areas within the Enhanced Risk zone experiencing thunderstorm winds or wind gusts in excess of 50 kn (60 mph; 95 km/h). Meanwhile, essentially the rest of Iowa was put under a Slight Risk.

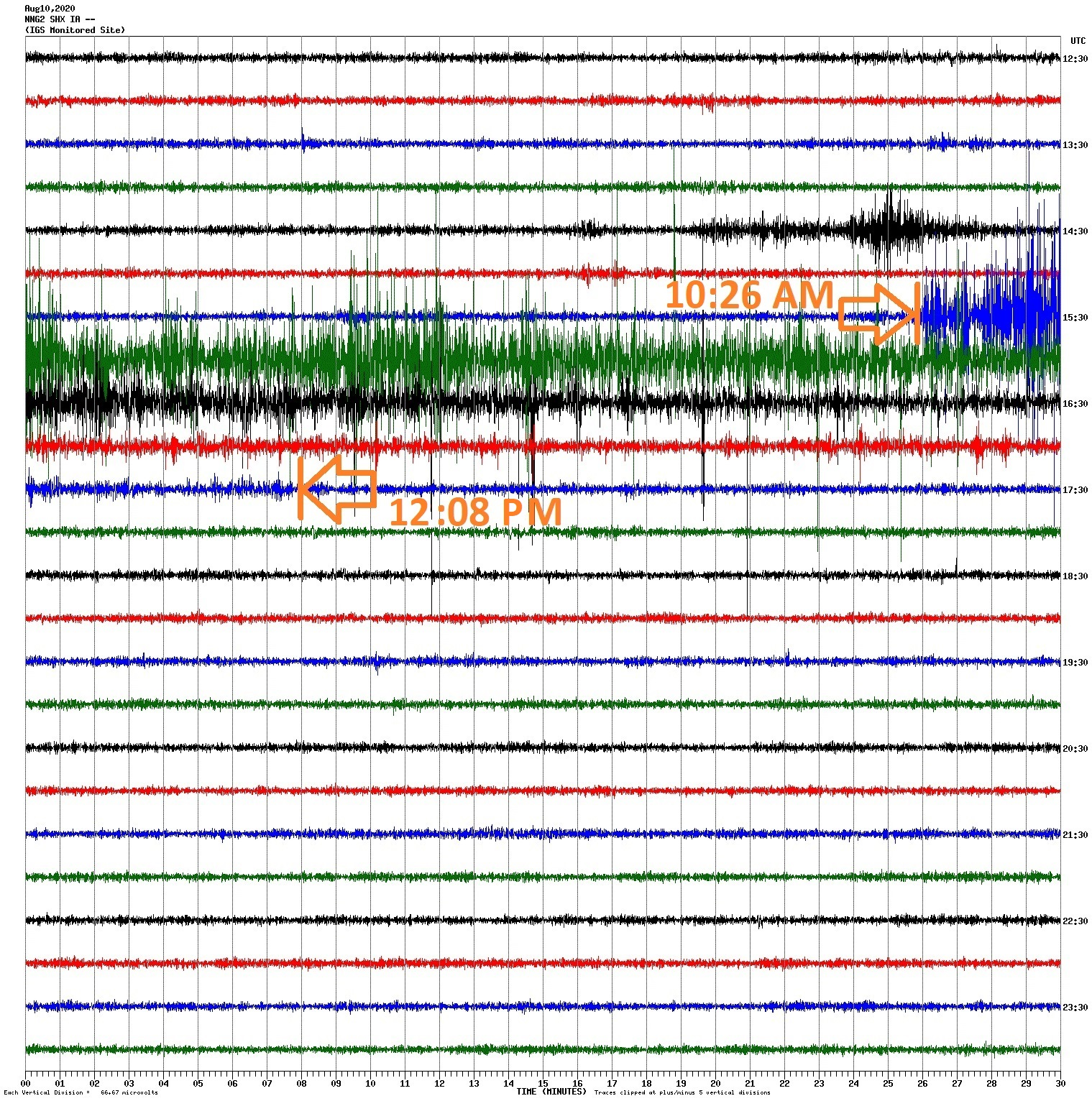
A seismogram in the Des Moines metropolitan area recorded intense vibrations imparted by the strong winds associated with the derecho.

After 8:00 a.m., the storm moved through Sioux City, Iowa, crossing the Big Sioux River and entering western Iowa. Heating associated with the daytime hours made for warmer conditions near the ground, allowing strong winds produced by the storms to descend to and reach the surface. The storm's winds began to increase considerably after the storm reached west central Iowa at around 10: a.m. During this time, some of the derecho's winds spread outward from the storm beneath an atmospheric inversion aloft, spreading to the south and southeast and causing damage over 50 mi (80 km) away from the storm in areas with minimal rainfall. Over the next two hours, the storm traversed central Iowa with a rapid forward speed of up to 60 mph (95 km/h), impacting communities including Ames, Des Moines, and Marshalltown. Wind gusts approaching 120 mph (190 km/h) were produced by the storm during this period. Aloft, the storm was being supported by a rear-inflow jet sporting winds of 80–100 kn (90–115 mph; 150–185 km/h) with the downwind airmass exhibiting convective available potential energy (CAPE) values between 2000–2500 J/kg.

At 11:25 a.m., a severe thunderstorm watch tagged as denoting a particularly dangerous situation was issued by the SPC for areas ahead of the storm including central Iowa, southern Wisconsin, northern Illinois, and northwestern Indiana. Shortly after, the SPC introduced a Moderate Risk for severe weather in its categorical outlooks for similar areas. Around the same time, a counterclockwise vortex developed on the northern end of the storm, resulting in the storm attaining a bow-like structure with its strongest winds at the apex of this shape. University of Oklahoma meteorologist and tornado expert Stephen Corfidi remarked that the vortex was "one of the most distinctive ones of that size" he had ever seen. The core of stronger winds tracked east at speeds of 65–70 mph (110–130 km/h) and bore faster wind speeds. The derecho was at its strongest when it moved across the Cedar Rapids area of eastern Iowa. Based on the severity of damage observed, the NWS estimated that wind gusts of 130–140 mph (210–230 km/h) impacted parts of Benton and Linn counties in Iowa, including downtown Cedar Rapids and Marion. These winds diminished slightly as the derecho approached the Mississippi River, though gusts of 80–100 mph (130–160 km/h) remained widespread. The more extreme corridor of wind gusts transitioned into a broader swath of 60–70 mph (97–113 km/h) winds as the storm moved across northern Illinois and northwestern Indiana between 2–5 p.m. Despite the weakening of straight-line winds, the atmospheric environment became more conducive for tornadogenesis during this time. This resulted in several brief EF0 and EF1 tornadoes developing over northern Illinois and Indiana. The derecho's winds continued to lessen as the storm tracked farther east, weakening below damaging levels shortly after 7 p.m. as the storm was moving into Ohio and Michigan.

== Impact and damage ==
=== Overview ===
In its October 2020 review, NOAA updated its database of billion-dollar disasters to include this event (along with other disasters from the summer season) with preliminary estimated damages averaging 7.5 billion dollars, (Note: ±2.8 billion dollars at 90 percent confidence) before upgrading the estimate to $11 billion. (Note: ±1.6 billion dollars at 90 percent confidence) As of October 2020, it is the most costly thunderstorm in US history. The financial toll of this storm was the second-highest for an individual 2020 U.S. natural disaster, (Note: The 2020 Western United States wildfire season, at $16.5 billion, consists of multiple events combined.) surpassed only by Hurricane Laura's preliminary damage figure of $14.1 billion.

==== Utilities and telecommunications disruption ====
Nighttime visible satellite imagery from the Day-Night Band from the VIIRS instrument on NASA's Suomi NPP satellite animated before and the days after the derecho showing widespread power outages.

Utility disruption and infrastructure damage occurred in much of the storm's path. Early estimates showed more than a million customers without power. Between August 10 and 13, 1.9 million customers were affected by 1.4 million maximum simultaneous outages—759,000 in Illinois, 585,000 in Iowa, 283,000 in Indiana, and 345,000 in other states, including Missouri, Wisconsin, and Michigan.

Three days after the derecho, over 100,000 customers in Illinois, and 200,000 in Iowa, remained without power. The damage in some affected areas was so extensive that Mid-American Energy sent linemen to neighboring utility Alliant Energy to assist. The Duane Arnold Energy Center cooling towers were damaged and the nuclear reactor was shut down permanently. By August 23, Alliant announced that power had been restored to 99 percent of their affected customers. Mediacom, a telecommunications company, reported 340,000 customers lost Internet access in the affected states.

==== Property damage ====
The storm's winds caused wide-scale damage to plants, particularly trees, snapping large limbs, ripping off branches, and even felling or uprooting whole trees, often damaging houses and vehicles, as well as electrical and telecommunications infrastructure. Houses sustained significant damage to roofs, windows, and siding. Commercial and industrial property also sustained major structural damage from the storm. Large vehicles (such as semi-trailer trucks and recreational vehicles) as well as mobile homes were blown over, sent flying, or destroyed. Terry Dusky, chief executive officer of electrical infrastructure company ITC Midwest, described the storm damage as "...equivalent of a 40-mile wide tornado that rolled over 100 miles of the state."

==== Agricultural damage ====
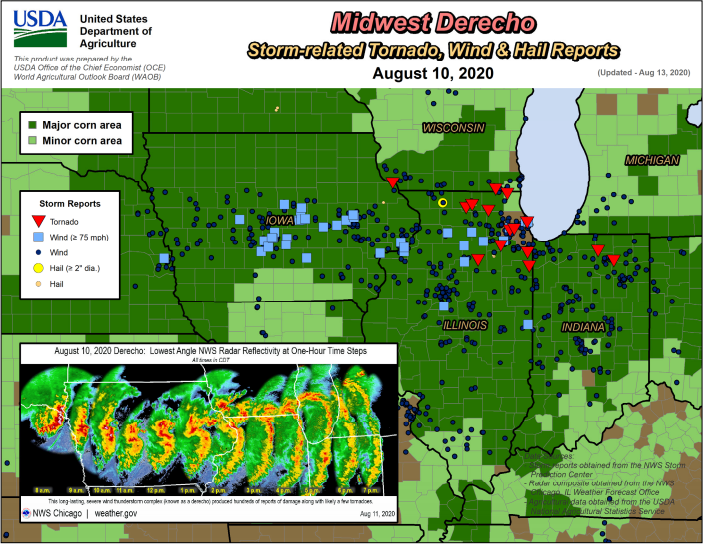
Storm reports from the National Weather Service layered over the United States Department of Agriculture's corn production area maps.

Farmers in Iowa, a major agricultural state and top corn producer in the US, found their crops had been flattened and agricultural infrastructure such as silos, grain bins and grain elevators imploded by the storm. The crop damage was visible in satellite imagery, which the USDA called impressive. NASA researchers assisted in satellite image analysis of derecho crop damage.

The USDA's Risk Management Agency reported that 57 of Iowa's 99 counties, with 14 million acres (56,700 km^{2}) of crops, had been in the derecho's path. (Note: Early estimates of the damaged crops were around 10 million acres (40,500 km^{2}) in Iowa which is approximately 43 percent of the 21.3 million acres (86,200 km^{2}) of corn and soybeans planted in 2020 or a little more than a third of the state's total 30.6 million acres (124,000 km^{2}) of arable land.) This is almost 66 percent of the 21.3 million acres (86,200 km^{2}) of corn and soybeans planted in 2020, or 45 percent of the state's total 30.6 million acres (124,000 km^{2}) of arable land. Damage was particularly heavy in 36 of those 57 counties, accounting for a total of 3.57 million acres (14,400 km^{2}) of corn and 2.5 million acres (10,100 km^{2}) of soybeans, which combined account for 20 percent of Iowa's cropland. Iowa Secretary of Agriculture Mike Naig said, on August 14, that the storm was a "devastating blow" to the Iowa agricultural industry, especially since it took place mere weeks before the beginning of the seasonal harvest. On August 19, he said the storm destroyed an estimated 100 million US bushels (3.52 million cubic metres) worth of grain storage and processing infrastructure as well.

The average projected yield for the state was nearly halved, from 202 US bushels per acre (1,760 m^{3}/km^{2}) to 100–150 US bushels per acre (871–1,310 m^{3}/km^{2}). Prescient Weather CEO Jan Dutton estimated that 180–270 million US bushels (6.34–9.51 million cubic metres) had been destroyed or degraded, a small portion of the tens of billions of bushels the US produces annually. Arlan Suderman, chief commodities economist for StoneX, estimated the damage to Iowa crops to be 200–400 million US bushels (7.05–14.1 million cubic metres).

The agricultural damage of the derecho was compounded by a concurrent drought affecting 31 counties. Farmers preferred drought to wet conditions in the wake of the derecho damage, as wet conditions would induce rot and make it harder to harvest the flattened crops.

=== Nebraska ===
In eastern Nebraska near Tekamah and Fremont, some of earliest storm damage occurred. The National Weather Service issued a warning at 8:45 a.m., with Omaha reporting its first damage just eight minutes later. Winds reached 67 mph (108 km/h; 30.0 m/s), tree damage was significant, downed limbs blocked some roads. At least one person was injured. In Omaha, the state's largest city, over 50,000 were left without power, a couple thousand remained so for two or three days.

=== Iowa ===
Animated satellite imagery taken from the MODIS aboard NASA's Terra satellite showing widespread agricultural and foliage damage resulting from the derecho.

Affected towns and cities advised residents not to travel due to damage. City-wide and county-wide states of emergency were declared. On August 13, Iowa Governor Kim Reynolds issued a state-level disaster proclamation for 23 of Iowa's counties, which expanded to 27 counties on August 14. Several major roads in Iowa City were closed due to storm debris, including Interstate 380 between Iowa City and Cedar Rapids. By August 16, the Iowa Governor's office estimated that the storm severely damaged or destroyed over 8,000 homes and caused $23.6 million in damage to public infrastructure. The cost of cleaning up debris from the storm was estimated at $21.6 million. Lake Macbride State Park, Palisades-Kepler State Park, Pleasant Creek State Recreation Area, and Wapsipinicon State Park were closed through the end of August for cleanup and repair.

On August 17, President Trump partially approved Gov. Reynolds' request for a federal disaster declaration. An amended declaration for Individual Assistance was approved by the White House for Linn County, Iowa alone on August 20, then expanded to 10 counties on September 1 along with concurrent natural disaster declarations from the United States Department of Agriculture on September 3. On September 10, Gov. Reynolds extended the disaster proclamation for those aforementioned Iowa counties. On September 11, it was announced FEMA added seven additional Iowa counties (for a total of 23) to the August 17 federal disaster declaration, as well as the Sac and Fox Tribe of the Mississippi in Iowa.

In an October 2020 article, Emma Hanigan, an urban forester for the Iowa Department of Natural Resources, said that the impact on the state's trees will be felt for decades. By December 2020, all state parks closed had reopened except Palisades-Kepler State Park, which was closed for eight months, reopening on April 23, 2021. In 2025, it was estimated a total of 7.07 million trees combined between forests and urban trees were damaged across Iowa by the derecho.

==== Cedar Rapids area ====
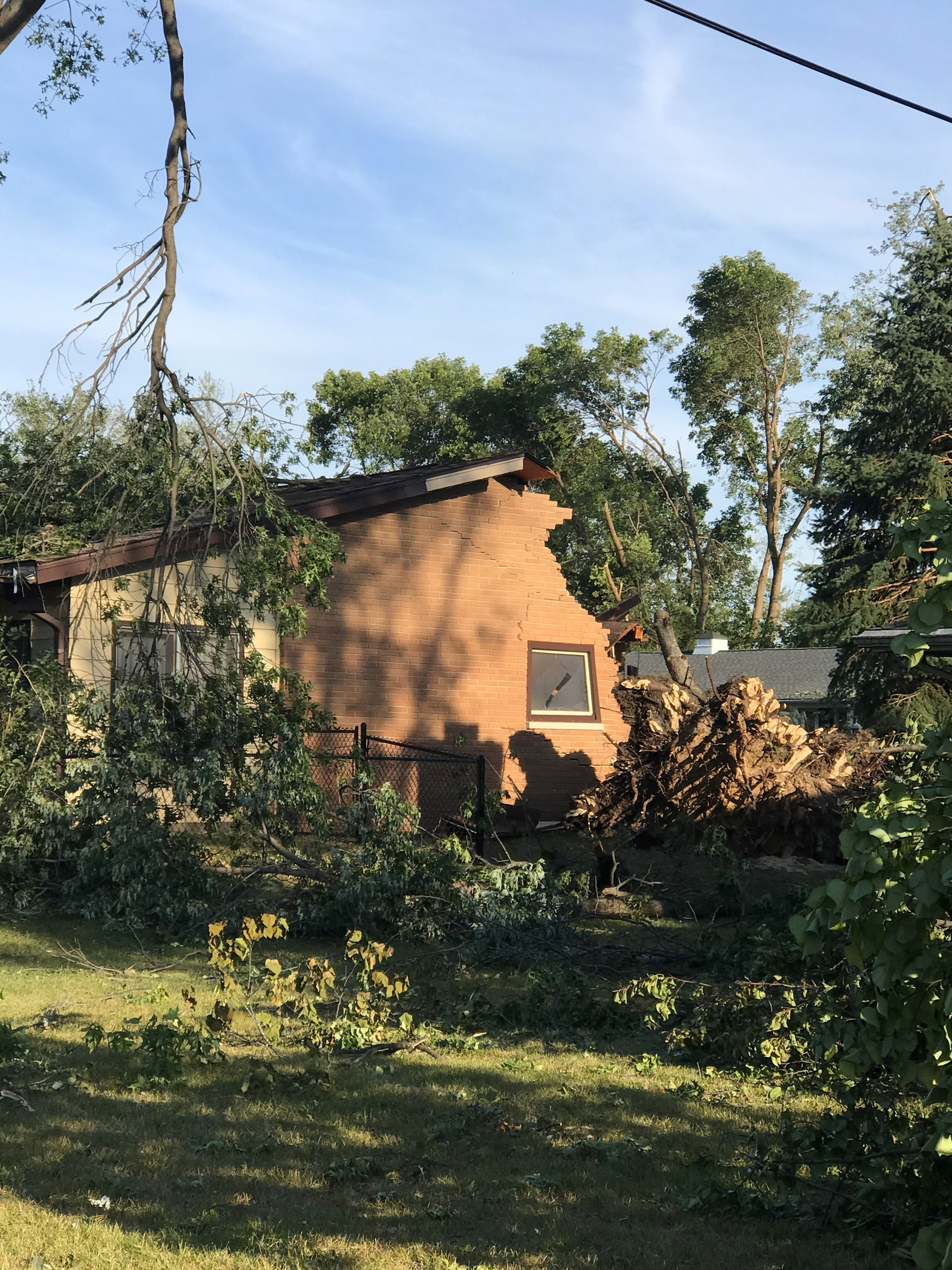
A home in the Kenwood District of Cedar Rapids damaged by the winds estimated by the National Weather Service to have been 130 mph (210 km/h; 58 m/s).

Cedar Rapids, Iowa, the Linn County seat and second-largest city in the state, was one of the hardest hit areas of the storm. Adjutant General Benjamin Corell, Commander of the Iowa National Guard, compared the extent of the damage with what he personally witnessed after Hurricane Katrina. Cedar Rapids city officials described the damage as being worse than the 2008 flood. Local hospitals, running on backup power, saw hundreds of injuries due to the storm. The widespread debris, downed electrical lines, and gas leaks led to a curfew through August 24. Cedar Rapids Director of Public Works Jen Winter said in September 2020 that months of cleanup lay ahead for the city. Approximately 65% of the tree canopy was destroyed city wide.

===== Utility damage and outages =====
After the storm, Linn County peaked at over 95 percent power loss to residents due to infrastructure damage, with Cedar Rapids experiencing a maximum 98 percent power loss. Thousands of electrical poles and miles of wire were downed; many residential gas connections were also broken. Radio masts and towers were damaged or destroyed, causing radio outages and dysfunctional mobile phone service.

On August 12, Mediacom said 57,000 modems were offline across eastern Iowa, most of them in the Cedar Rapids area; two days later, nearly 10,000 of those customers were still without service. On August 14, a hundred engineering and support personnel of the Iowa National Guard were activated to assist the region. A week after the storm, 75,000 Iowans, most of them in Linn County, still lacked electricity. There were 40,000 Iowans in Cedar Rapids left without power up to at least August 17. On August 19, the Linn County Rural Electric Cooperative announced 99 percent power restoration to its customers. By September 22, hundreds of Mediacom and ImOn customers still remained without internet service.

===== Property damage =====
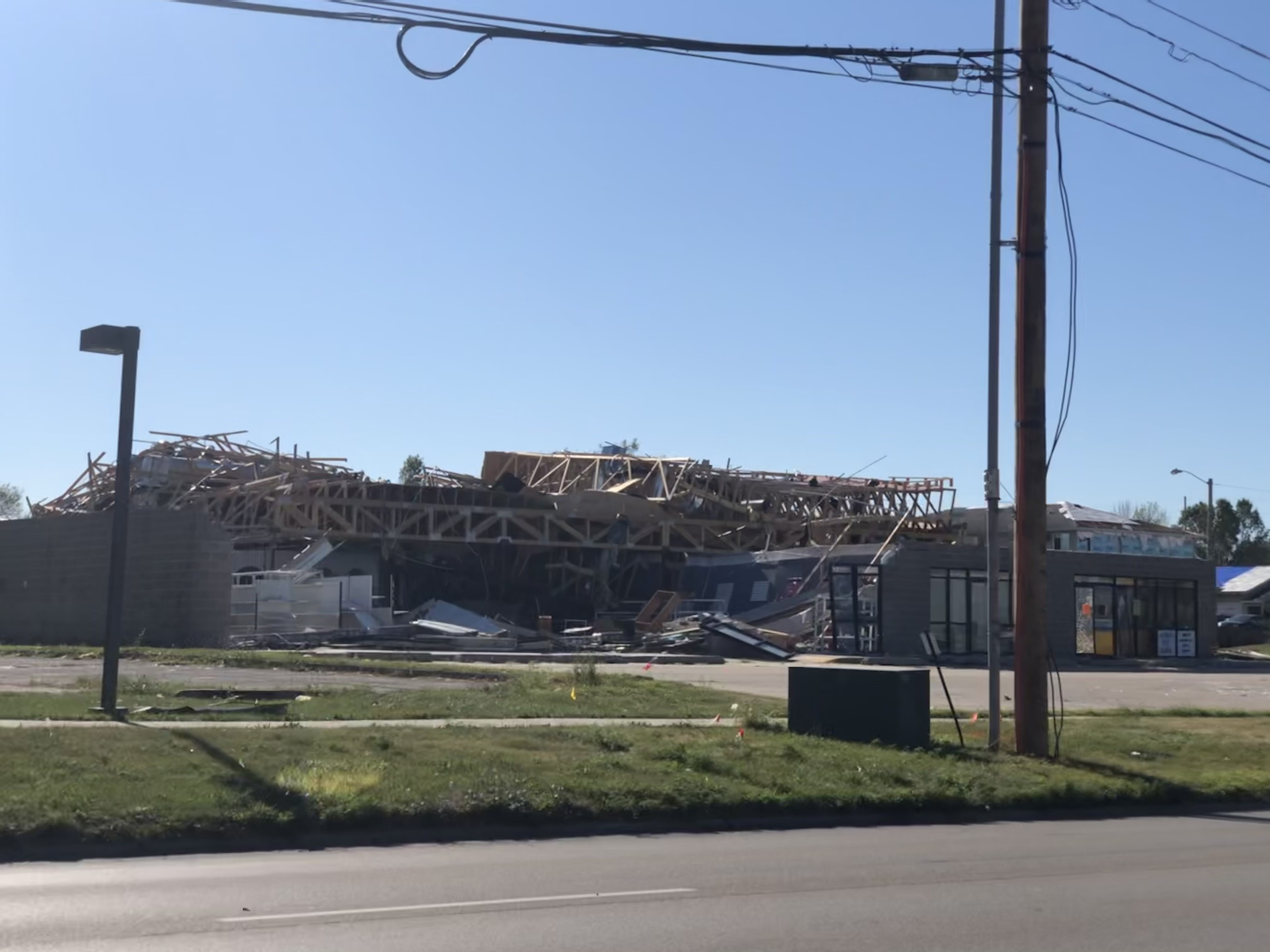
Heavy damage to Wiley Plaza in southwest Cedar Rapids, Iowa on August 19.

Almost every structure within the 75 square miles (190 km^{2}) Cedar Rapids city limits, including residences, 20 schools, and businesses, was damaged in some way, much of it severe, some of it catastrophic.

Hundreds of thousands of trees, for which Cedar Rapids was known, were severely damaged or felled by the storm with both Cedar Rapids and nearby Marion estimated to have lost half or more of their tree canopy from the storm; professional arborists and state foresters urged residents to seek professional help for their tree damage, saying it could take months to clean up. Many local businesses were forced to close, some indefinitely due to damage. Most of the city's roads became impassible due to storm debris. Without electrical refrigeration, food spoiled en masse while trash and recycling pickup had been halted until August 31 due to impassable streets causing bags of rotting trash to line curbsides, subjecting them to scavengers.

===== Evaluation and cleanup of damage and debris =====
In a preliminary evaluation four days after the storm, the Cedar Rapids fire department declared over a thousand residences unsafe to occupy; in addition, 300 had non-structural damage and over 200 cosmetic damage. By August 23, that count had shrunk to 140, with many more buildings being added to the non-structural damage category.

By September 4, 2020, utility workers had installed over 3,400 new poles along with 400 mi (640 km; 640,000 m) of wiring in the Cedar Rapids area after repairing most of the main electrical infrastructure in the city. As of November 17, 2020, Alliant Energy was still working on restoring street lights in the area, many still hampered by debris or broken trees.

On November 9, 2020, Dr. Melanie Giesler, a local physician, said increased allergies in the area were likely due to the derecho damage, spurred on by dust, debris, and mold growing on dead plant matter.

In July 2022, The Gazette reported that nearly two years after the derecho, owners of homes with historic preservation concerns were still repairing antique windows damaged by the storm. Local groups and trusts were reported to have organized workshops for affected homeowners about how to properly restore this type of construction.

====== Debris collection and tree removals ======
On August 21, Marion city officials announced 98 percent of its streets were cleared and over 7,000 truckloads of debris had been removed. A month after the storm, Cedar Rapids had completed the first pass of storm debris collection on only 37.5 percent of its streets. By September 28, the city had removed 53,598 truckloads of debris for an approximate total of 230,000 short tons (210,000 t).

As of November 24, 2020, cleanup was ongoing with the city currently working on the final public collection of non-organic debris. Collection of organic/tree debris is continuing indefinitely with the city having removed 2.8 million cubic yards (2.1 million cubic metres) of organic debris to date; the trimming of damaged tree limbs in the public right of way is 73 percent complete.

On December 3, Taylor Burgin, Cedar Rapids' construction engineering manager, said that city crews and contractors are beginning a thorough cleanup of city parks — this is expected to add an estimated 1.5 million cubic yards (1.1 million cubic metres) to city removal metrics. Burgin also noted the city has removed around 2,000 trees, but needed at least 10,000 more to complete citywide cleanup.

==== Des Moines metropolitan area ====
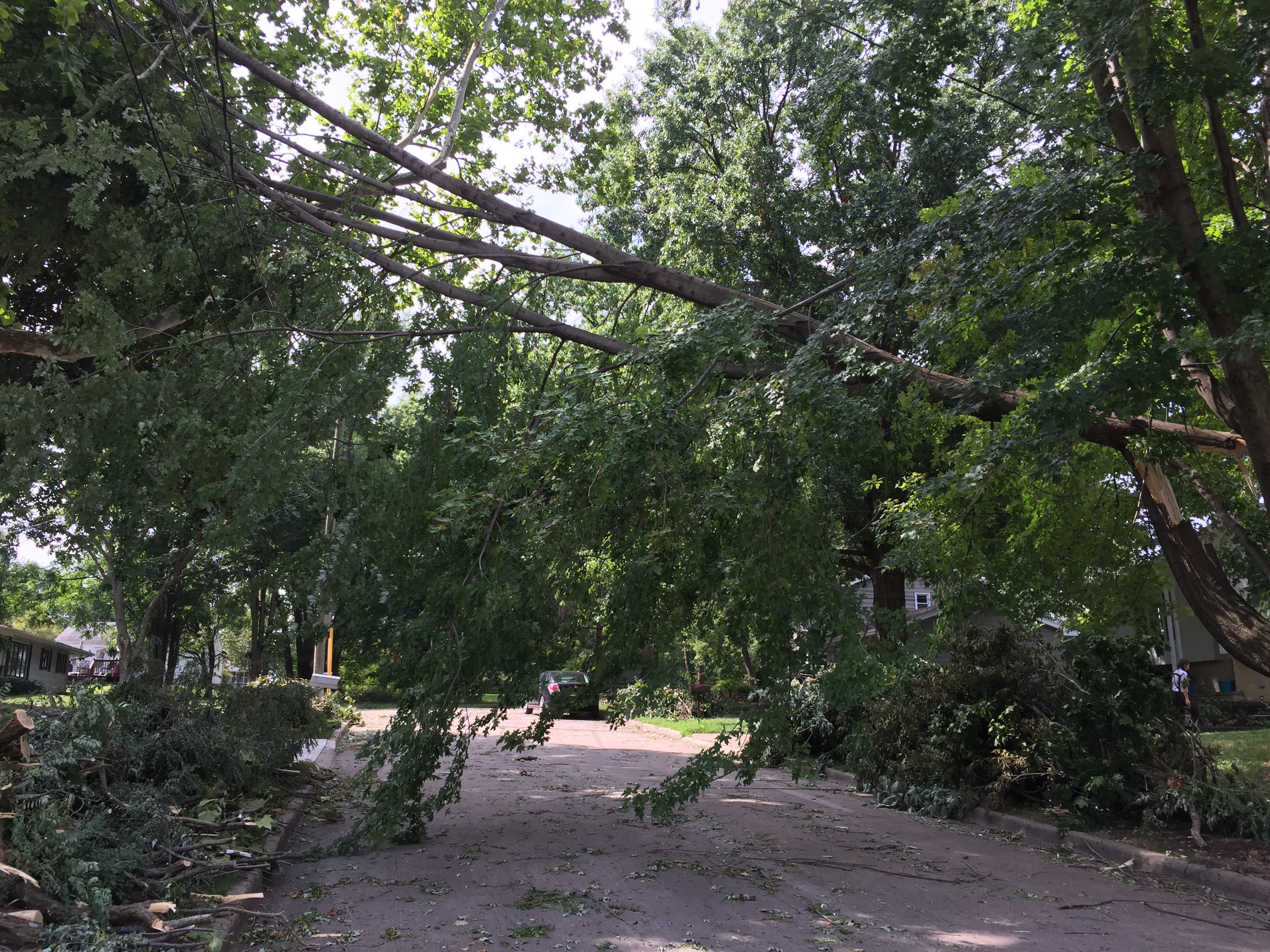
A street in the Merle Hay neighborhood of Des Moines, Iowa covered by downed tree branches and foliage.

In the Des Moines metropolitan area, over 132,000 customer experienced outages, according to MidAmerican. The city said on August 21 that cleanup was slower than desired, estimating that damage cleanup could take up to six weeks. It planned to lease equipment from contractors to accelerate cleanup.

The city of Ankeny estimated it would take four to six weeks to fully clean up debris. A Hy-Vee grocery store there was found by the Iowa Department of Natural Resources to have illegally dumped 800 US gallons (3,000 L) of spoiled milk into storm sewers, contaminating a local waterway. The company assisted the state in cleanup efforts, blaming misinformed employees. Buccaneer Arena, home ice of the Des Moines Buccaneers minor-league hockey team, sustained significant roof damage.

==== Marshalltown ====
Marshalltown suffered extensive property damage. Over a hundred cars parked near a factory had their windows blown out. Reports described 99 miles per hour (160 kilometers per hour; 44 meters per second) winds, roofs being ripped off, and loose wood debris embedded in the sides of buildings. One week after the storm, nearly 7,000 residents of the city were still waiting for power restoration; 99 percent restoration was achieved on Aug 23. The damage to public parks in the city and surrounding Marshall County was "extensive", particularly to trees.

Damage metrics released on September 1 showed nearly 2,800 buildings were damaged or destroyed in the storm, more than the 2018 EF3 tornado which hit the city. City cleanup for the derecho is estimated around $4 million, of which FEMA and the Iowa Homeland Security and Emergency Management will assist for reimbursement. By August 20, the city had hauled away 66,000 cubic yards (50,000 m^{3}) of debris, almost triple the amount of the 2018 tornado. By late October, Justin Nickel, the city's public works director, said debris collection and cleanup were nearly complete for the city.

Marshalltown Veteran's Memorial Coliseum, a historic city sports venue, is reopening soon as of November 30, 2020 after being severely damaged by the 2018 tornado and later impacted by the derecho. As of December 8, 2020, Riverside Cemetery, a century-old burial site located in the city, remains littered with debris as the city struggles to raise money for its care.

=== Illinois ===
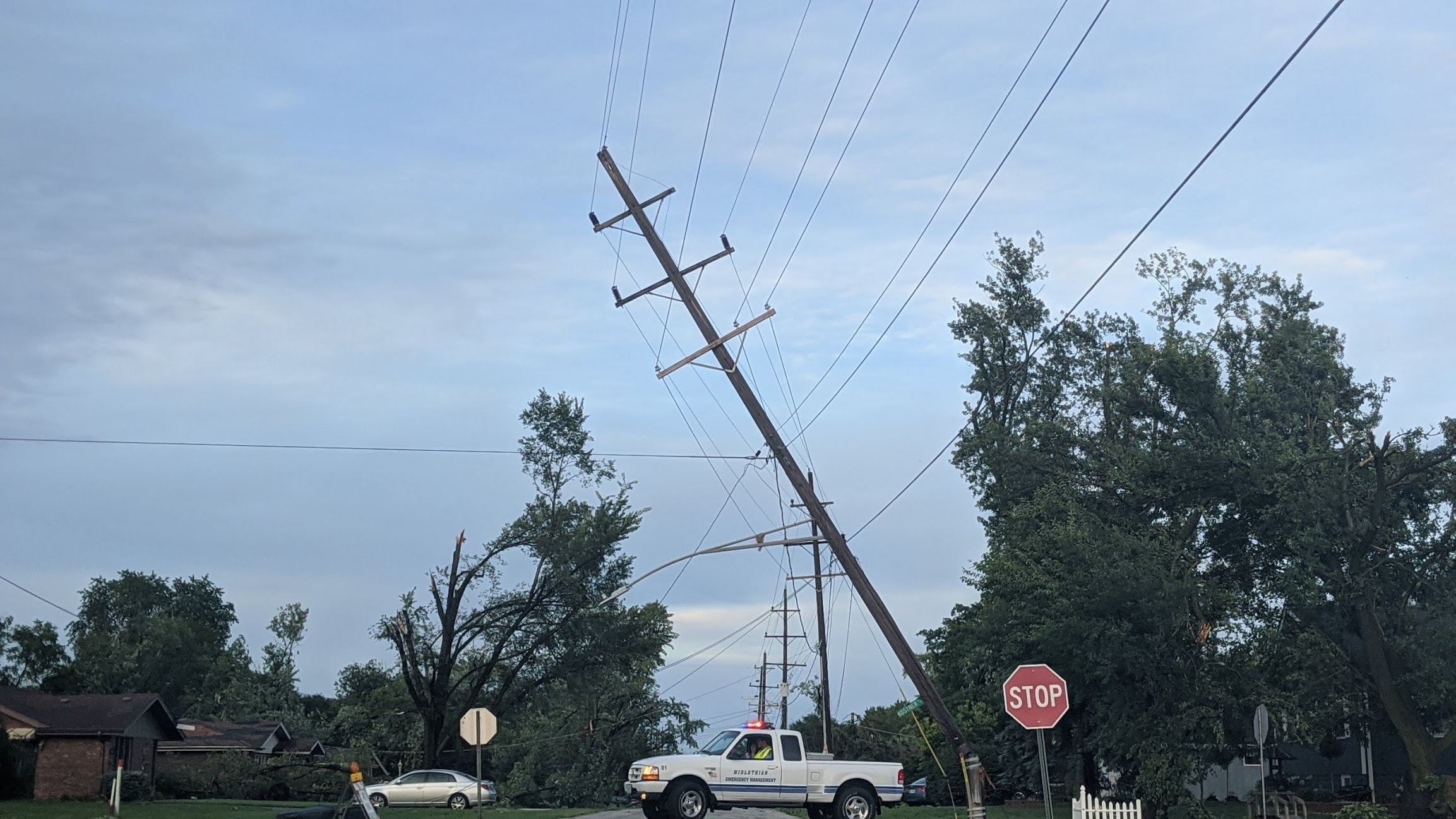
Phone pole that was knocked down in Midlothian, Illinois

Across the state of Illinois, high winds and fifteen weak tornadoes, the majority of the derecho's tornadoes, caused variable damage to buildings, trees, and vehicles. Officials reported a dozen individuals directly injured by the storm across the state. A month after the storm, Chicago was still cleaning up storm damaged areas. In city parks, over 500 trees fell. The city fielded over 12,000 emergency calls regarding trees in the city after the storm hit. Over 800,000 Com Ed customers lost power.

=== Confirmed fatalities ===
In Fort Wayne, Indiana, a woman was killed when high winds tipped over her mobile home. In Poweshiek County, Iowa, Emergency Management confirmed the deaths of two: a Malcom woman in her 40s killed when a tree fell on her porch and a Brooklyn man in his 40s, a city employee and electrician, killed by electrocution from a downed power line he was attempting to repair. The Linn County Sheriff's Office confirmed a 63-year-old man died from a falling tree while biking.

== Responses and criticism ==
In the week after the storm, Iowa elected officials such as US Senators Chuck Grassley and Joni Ernst, US Representative Abby Finkenauer, and Governor Kim Reynolds called for and worked to secure a federal disaster declaration from President Donald Trump. The declaration was formally requested by Reynolds on August 16 for nearly $4 billion in federal aid.

The following day, Trump announced he had partially approved Reynolds's request, but did not approve the requested FEMA Individual Assistance Program, which Reynolds's office says "provides disaster-impacted homeowners and businesses with programs and services to maximize recovery, including assistance with housing, personal property replacement, medical expenses and legal services". An amended declaration to include Individual Assistance worked its way through Washington, according to Reynolds. The White House approved it for Linn County on August 20.

On September 1, the governor's Office announced the addition of 10 counties (Note: Benton, Boone, Cedar, Jasper, Marshall, Polk, Poweshiek, Scott, Story, and Tama counties) approved for FEMA Individual Assistance. On September 3, US Secretary of Agriculture Sonny Perdue declared natural disasters in eighteen (Note: Benton, Boone, Cedar, Clinton, Dallas, Guthrie, Hamilton, Hardin, Jasper, Johnson, Jones, Linn, Marshall, Polk, Poweshiek, Scott, Story, and Tama counties), opening up Farm Service Agency and other USDA disaster relief programs. On September 11, it was announced FEMA added seven (Note: Greene, Grundy, Guthrie, Hardin, Iowa, Jackson, and Washington counties) Iowa counties to the August 17 federal disaster declaration increasing the total counties to 23 (Note: Benton, Boone, Cedar, Clinton, Dallas, Greene, Grundy, Guthrie, Hardin, Iowa, Jackson, Jasper, Johnson, Jones, Linn, Marshall, Muscatine, Polk, Poweshiek, Scott, Story, Tama, and Washington counties), allowing for Public Assistance Program use in those counties; a separate declaration was declared for the Sac and Fox Tribe of the Mississippi in Iowa as well.

=== Official visits ===
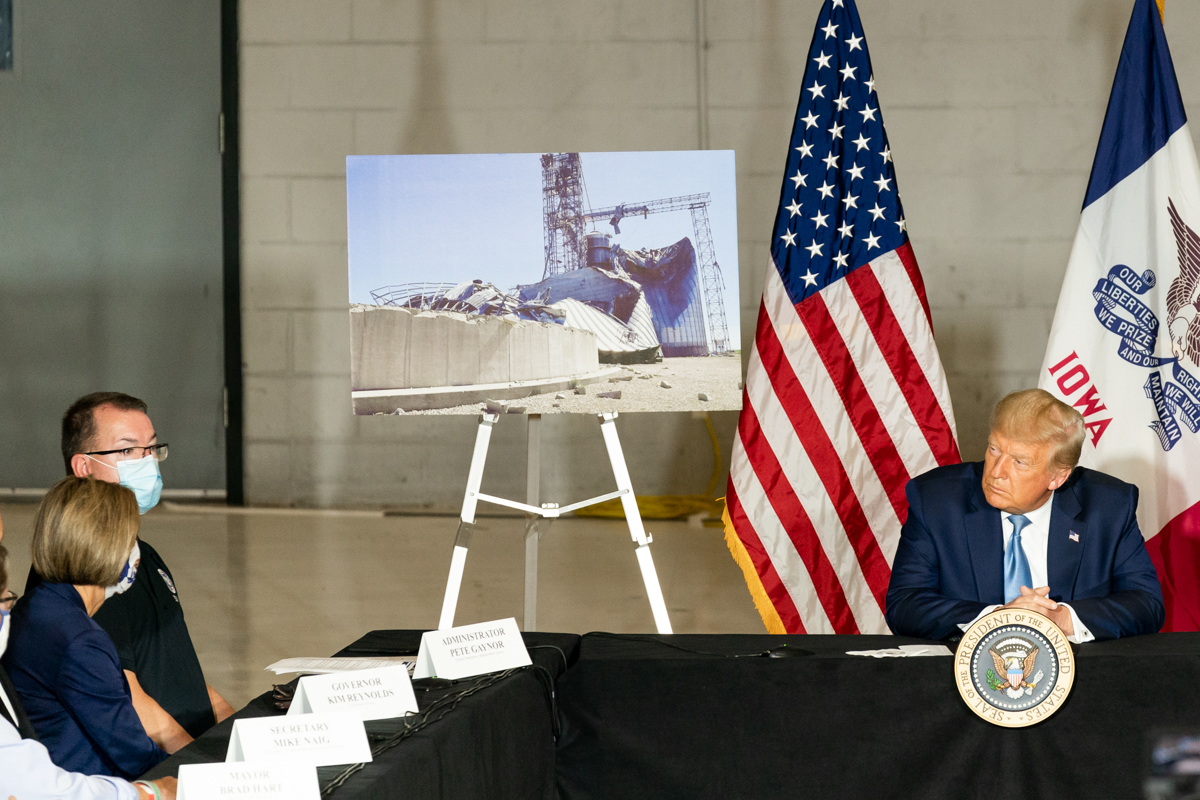
President Donald Trump receiving a briefing on Iowa disaster recovery, August 18, 2020

On August 13, Vice President Mike Pence held two campaign rallies in Iowa. He promised to help Iowa rebuild, but did not tour areas damaged by the storm.

On August 14, Reynolds arrived in Cedar Rapids, Iowa with more than 100 Iowa National Guard members, activated to help repair the damage.

On August 15, Finkenauer toured damage in Marshalltown.

On August 17, Pete Gaynor, Administrator of FEMA, traveled to Iowa to meet with Governor Reynolds about the disaster.

On August 18, Trump arrived at midday in Cedar Rapids, joining a private meeting with Iowa senators Grassley, Ernst and Cedar Rapids Mayor Brad Hart. At the meeting, Hart begged Trump to approve the Individual Assistance Program. Trump remained at the airport and did not interact with the public, tour damage, or assist in recovery efforts during his visit.

On August 19, Naig met with farmers in Marion to personally assess the damage. Ernst toured damaged in Marshalltown.

On September 2, Grassley and Ernst fielded questions from Cedar Rapids-area non-profit organizations.

On September 3, US Secretary of Agriculture Sonny Perdue underwent an Iowa National Guard-hosted aerial tour of crop damage in Iowa along with Reynolds, Ernst, and Naig.

=== Local, non-government, or individual assistance efforts ===
On August 14, the city of Cedar Rapids set up five resource centers to distribute basic necessities to the public. These centers were later shut down on August 31. Many local businesses, private individuals, religious groups, and non-profit organizations, such as Cedar Valley Black Lives Matter, The Salvation Army and Tyson Foods, and United Way, raised money online or provided relief efforts on their own, distributing food, fuel, toiletries, or assisting in debris removal.

Mid-American Energy, one of Iowa's two major electric utilities, gave away bagged ice in Cedar Rapids on August 20–21. Operation BBQ Relief, a disaster relief agency specializing in barbecue, deployed to Cedar Rapids starting August 16, providing over 45,000 meals to residents as of August 21, earning praise from politicians. Local non-profits told Iowa's senators that assisting the region has been difficult due to the COVID-19 pandemic significantly reducing their donations and funding. On November 14, a large replanting campaign was announced that would begin in the spring of 2021.

=== Criticism ===
==== Lack of news coverage ====
Local news media were hard-pressed to provide reporting under disaster conditions, limiting national news coverage of the storm. KCRG-TV anchor Beth Malicki was especially prominent in speaking out on awareness of the situation. On August 13, Cedar Rapids Mayor Hart gave an interview where he rejected requesting National Guard assistance, uncertain of what it could do.

==== Lack of response and assistance ====
On August 14, Ashton Kutcher, originally from Cedar Rapids, criticized the lack of federal response and aid. He called on Pence and Trump to aid the affected areas. The same day, Iowa state officials were questioned about why it took three days to begin aid effort. General Benjamin Corell, commander of the Iowa National Guard, said they first received local requests for help on August 13.

Residents of Cedar Rapids had mixed emotions regarding official responses and assistance. For many, they felt ignored for days after the storm and offered too-little, too-late by the non-local support. Some impoverished or less-affluent neighborhood residents said they felt neglected, abandoned, or given lower priority among utility and government assistance. Many grassroots efforts began hours after the storm subsided, with residents lending support through mutual aid, and trying to take care of the least fortunate, but finding working with government and assistance organizations very disheartening.

The lack of electricity, telecommunications, and ability to travel led to the delays in assistance according to both official and non-government organizations. These explanations did not reassure storm-battered populations. Tamara Marcus, activist with Cedar Rapids Advocates for Social Justice, a Black Lives Matter organization, said "We need to ask ourselves, 'Why is it that each time we have a disaster or pandemic, the most-vulnerable are the worst impacted, particularly communities of color?' " during a September 2 forum with Ernst and Grassley. Residential damage doubled the homeless population in the Cedar Rapids area as some landlords evicted residents from unsafe apartment complexes.

==== Role of politicians ====
Abby Finkenauer, then-US Representative for Iowa's 1st congressional district (which encompassed Cedar Rapids and other hard-hit areas), used her local office for an assistance event, personally handing out essentials such as food, water, and toiletries until supplies ran out. Finkenauer's challenger in the 2020 United States House of Representatives elections, then-Iowa State Representative Ashley Hinson criticized her opponent for showing images of these events in a campaign ad, with the Republican Party of Iowa calling it "disgraceful". The Democratic Congressional Campaign Committee returned the criticism, saying that while Hinson had released a stereotypical ad and posed for storm-related photo ops, Finkenauer actually worked on doing something meaningful at the time. Hinson has since collaborated with local religious and charitable groups.

Ernst and her Democratic challenger in that year's election, Theresa Greenfield, both provided assistance. Greenfield handed out supplies, served food, and toured damage. Ernst helped distribute food with local charities including Meals on Wheels. Neither politician saw the disaster assistance as optional. Reynolds and Hinson both visited the August 21 Operation BBQ Relief event.

Political science professors in the state commented. Tim Hagle from the University of Iowa said the key is "to strike the balance between political grandstanding — or opportunism — and a genuine desire to help, which also helps you politically". Chris Larimer of the University of Northern Iowa concurred, adding that practical help is more likely to earn voter support. At Cornell College, Megan Goldberg said "an elected official wants to claim credit for disaster relief that is effective, while avoiding blame for any mismanagement of disaster relief", concluding that "even a candidate or official who genuinely wants to visit a site — either to help or to gather information — has to think about how the visit can be spun to his or her political advantage, and how to reply to criticisms of such visits. But that's the way it often is these days."

== Possible impact of climate change ==
The severity of the storm raised the question of whether climate change intensified it. A variety of climate experts from Georgia Tech, Colorado University, North Carolina State, and other institutions told the Associated Press, in the wake of the derecho, 2020 wildfire season, and 2020 Atlantic hurricane season, that more intense natural disasters like these are consistent with climate change.

Climate change is a possible cause of the intensity of derechos overall, said Iowa State University and National Weather Service (Des Moines) scientists; experts disagreed if it was responsible for this particular storm. The NWS said it was atypical for such a severe storm to not appear in the previous day's weather models. Additionally, NWS research into derechos indicates weather patterns in the region to be shifting towards the poles, which might be a result of climate change. The high damage estimate aligns with analysis showing increases in the costs of natural disasters as a result of climate change-driven storm intensity.

== Official notices and records ==
Radar track of the derecho from August 10 at 2 a.m. CDT to August 11 at 4 a.m. CDT.

The Storm Prediction Center (SPC) did not initially foresee an event of this magnitude, primarily due to sporadic model solutions, more specifically the large variance in intensity, location, and coverage of this derecho. During the 06:00 UTC (1AM CDT) convective outlook update, a slight, or level 2/5 risk for severe thunderstorms was introduced in an area spanning approximately from Kansas to central Illinois due to other severe weather potential, with lower threats in the area eventually hit by the derecho. As model guidance became clearer during the overnight hours, parts of Iowa and Illinois were put under an enhanced (level 3/5) risk at 13:00 UTC (8AM CDT) before the region was further upgraded to a moderate risk (level 4/5) at 16:30 UTC (11:30AM CDT) once the derecho was clearly underway and expected to continue.

=== Official NWS Storm Prediction Center publications ===
==== Severe Weather Watch Bulletins ====
Bulletin #	Issued (UTC) (Note: Converted to UTC from CDT (#424-430) and EDT (#431))	Type	Covered areas	Storm location	Storm heading	Watch details
424	11:05–16:00	SVA (Note: SVA is the SAME code for a Severe Thunderstorm Watch)	South Dakota (SE), Nebraska (NE), Iowa (NW)	South Dakota-Nebraska border area	East (into eastern Iowa)	Significant winds to 75 mph (120 km/h); Significant hail to 2" (5 cm)
425	13:55–19:00	SVA	Iowa (most of state)	Iowa-Nebraska-South Dakota border area	East (into central Iowa)	Significant winds to 80 mph (130 km/h); Hail to 1.5" (3.8 cm)
426	16:25–00:00	SVA (PDS)	Iowa (E), Illinois (N), Wisconsin (S)	Iowa (central)	East (toward Lake Michigan)	Extreme winds to 100 mph (160 km/h); Hail to 1.5" (3.8 cm); Isolated tornadoes
427	18:00–00:00	SVA	Wisconsin (E), Michigan (Upper Peninsula)	Iowa-Illinois border area	East (spreading north toward Lake Michigan)	Winds to 70 mph (110 km/h); Hail to 1.5" (3.8 cm)
428	19:55–03:00	SVA	Illinois, Missouri (E)	Iowa-Illinois border area, East Illinois	East (spreading south toward southern Illinois)	Winds to 70 mph (110 km/h); Hail to 1.5" (3.8 cm)
429	20:25–04:00	SVA	Michigan (S), Indiana (N)	Illinois (N)	East (toward Indiana)	Significant winds to 80 mph (130 km/h)
430	23:30–05:00	SVA	Illinois (S), Indiana (S), Kentucky (NW)	Illinois (central), Indiana (central), Missouri (E)	Southeast (spreading toward Kentucky)	Winds to 70 mph (110 km/h); Hail to 1" (2.5 cm)
431	00:05–05:00	SVA	Ohio (E)	Indiana, Michigan, Illinois (S)	East (Ohio)	Winds to 70 mph (110 km/h); Hail to 1" (2.5 cm)

==== Mesoscale Discussions ====
Discussion #	Issued (UTC) (Note: Converted to UTC from CDT (all discussions))	Areas Affected	Associated Watch	Discussion Details
1445	8:19	South Dakota (SE), Nebraska (NE), Iowa (NW)	Issuing: SVA #424	"Multiple clusters of thunderstorms have developed in the past hour across southern South Dakota and northeast NE."..."Ample CAPE is indicated in forecast soundings over this region, along with steep midlevel lapse rates and sufficient deep-layer shear for convective organization. Isolated instances of hail are the primary threat for now. However, CAM solutions [Convective Allowing Models] have suggested the potential for one or more of the clusters to grow upscale and become a bowing complex later this morning. If this trend begins to unfold, a WW may be needed to cover the downstream threat."
1447	12:46	Nebraska (NE/E), Iowa (NW/W), South Dakota (far SE)	Concerning: SVA #424	"Recent KFSD radar imagery shows the outflow outrunning the northern portion of the line in far southeast SD and adjacent far northeast NE. Additionally, the structure consistent with warm-air advection over a boundary, suggesting little organization in this area of the line as well. In between (roughly over Cedar, Wayne, and Dixon counties in NE) some better organization and faster forward storm motion has been noted. While likely still slightly elevated, this portion of the line currently poses the highest potential to produce damaging wind gusts. Recent storm motion of 45 kt takes this portion of the line to the NE/IA border around 8 am..."
1448	13:40	Iowa (Western and Central)	Issuing: SVA #425	"A small, bowing MCS along the NE/IA border has recently produced a measured 50 kt wind gust at KSUX..." "...the threat for severe/damaging wind gusts is expected to increase across parts of western/central IA. and a new Severe Thunderstorm Watch downstream is likely soon."
1449	14:45	Iowa (Central)	Concerning: SVA #425	"Numerous measured severe wind gusts have been observed across eastern NE and western IA over the past hour in association with a small MCS. As this bow moves quickly eastward (around 45-50 kt) into central IA this morning, it will encounter an increasingly unstable airmass. A focused corridor of severe/damaging winds of 60-70+ mph appears likely given recent radar trends..."
1450	15:42	Iowa (NE/E), Wisconsin (S), Illinois (N/C), Missouri (far NE)	Issuing: PDS SVA #426	"A compact MCS moving into central IA as of 1540z (10:40 am CDT) has recently produced numerous severe/damaging wind gusts. Recent radar trends suggest this system has already become very well organized, with the development of an 80-100+ kt rear-inflow jet only a couple thousand feet off the surface per KDMX velocity data. The airmass downstream of this MCS into eastern IA, southern WI, and northern/central IL is already quite unstable, with MLCAPE of 2000-2500 J/kg present per 15z (10 am CDT) mesoanalysis estimates. Additional dinural heating of this airmass is expected to yield very strong to potentially extreme instability by this afternoon, with MLCAPE potentially reaching the 3500-5500 J/kg range by peak heating."..."The forecast combination of very strong to extreme instability with adequate deep-layer shear downstream of the ongoing MCS strongly suggests that a swath of potentially significant severe wind gusts of 75+ mph is becoming increasingly likely this afternoon across parts of these areas. A new Severe Thunderstorm Watch will be needed downstream of the current watch in central IA [SVA #425] within the next hour or two. An upgrade to Moderate Risk for numerous significant severe/damaging wind gusts will be issued with the 1630z (11:30 am CDT) update of the Day 1 Convective Outlook." (See update here)
1451	16:00	Iowa (Central)	Concerning: SVA #425	"Latest velocity data from the KDMX radar shows an impressive significant wind signature with the ongoing MCS, with 80-115 kt inbound velocities noted only 500-1000 ft above ground level (AGL). These very likely severe winds will move across the Des Moines metro area shortly, and they will be capable of producing widespread, destructive damaging winds of 70-80+ mph as the MCS races eastward at 50-60 kt."
1452	17:14	Iowa (C/E), Illinois (NW)	Concerning: SVA #425, #426	"...the apex of the bow is moving eastward around 55-60 kt, and the potential for widespread damaging winds remains apparent. A recent measured severe wind gusts of 99 mph was reported at the Marshalltown ASOS associated with this bow, and a couple other gusts up to 100 mph have also been noted. Current expectations are for this bow echo to maintain its intensity across eastern IA...A swath of 70-100+ mph wind gusts producing destructive damage appears likely to impact the Cedar Rapids / Iowa City area within the next hour, eventually reaching the Quad Cities area around 1:00-1:30 pm."
1453	17:44	Wisconsin (E), Michigan (Upper Peninsula)	Issuing: SVA #427	"Visible satellite shows some clearing occurring across parts of central Wisconsin, allowing for some diabatic heating and temperatures into the mid 80s F with dew points in the low to mid 70s F. This has resulted in moderate destabilization of the atmosphere, with MLCAPE nearing 2500 J/kg..." "...any storms that develop in this region would pose a threat for damaging winds and isolated large hail..."
1455	18:36	Iowa (far E), Wisconsin (S), Illinois (N)	Concerning: SVA #426	"The potential for widespread and destructive damaging wind gusts of 70-100+ mph and perhaps a tornado or two will continue as a line of storms moves quickly eastwards across northern Illinois. This line will likely impact the Chicago metro area around 3:00 to 3:30 pm CDT."
1456	19:28	Michigan (S), Indiana (N/C), Ohio (NW)	Issuing: SVA #429	"A bow echo will continue moving rapidly eastward across northern IL and far southern WI this afternoon while producing widespread damaging winds of 70-100 mph. The airmass across southern Lower Michigan and northern/central Indiana continues to destabilize this afternoon, with surface temperatures having warmed into the mid to upper 80s, and surface dewpoints in the low to mid 70s..." "Resultant MLCAPE of 2000-3500 J/kg and around 25-30 kt of effective bulk shear will likely support the maintenance of the severe bow echo as it moves eastward across these areas this afternoon and early evening. Severe wind gusts, some 75+ mph, will likely produce numerous to widespread damaging winds, and a tornado or two cannot be ruled out with the circulations embedded within the line. This substantial severe wind risk is expected to increase within the next couple of hours, and a Severe Thunderstorm Watch will be issued to address this threat."
1457	19:38	Missouri, Kansas (far E), Illinois (S)	Issuing: SVA #428	"Given the widespread destabilization that has occurred, and the convective trends noted, convection should become more widespread throughout the afternoon. Despite ample instability, winds aloft are generally weak, with only about 20 kt of effective bulk shear present, with perhaps some enhancement near the MCS in central Illinois. Thus storms should form into a few multi-cell clusters, posing a threat for damaging winds and large hail. Convective trends will be monitored this for a potential watch issuance this afternoon."
1458	20:36	Illinois (N/C), Wisconsin (far SE), Indiana (NE), Michigan (far SW)	Concerning: SVA #426, #429	"...The greatest threat for 70-80+ mph wind gusts will likely focus over the Chicago metro area over the next hour"..."Latest velocity data from KLOT shows somewhat less extreme inbound velocities (generally 50-80 kt) compared to earlier. Even so, the overall bow echo remains well organized, and it is moving through a very strongly unstable airmass (3500-400+ J/kg MLCAPE)."..."A tornado or two embedded within the line also remains possible across this area, but the primary risk is still widespread damaging straight-line winds."
1459	20:46	Wisconsin (E), Michigan (N)	Concerning: SVA #427	"Storms are expected to continue moving from west to east across the watch area in advance of a cold front, with perhaps some increase in coverage. Uncertainty exists in whether or not the convection will persist as it crosses northern parts of Lake Michigan and entering into the L.P. of Michigan. Presently there exists a corridor of enhanced instability (MLCAPE near 2000 J/kg) and nearly homogeneous effective shear (30-35 kt). These conditions are forecast to persist into the evening hours. Thus, should trends in convective coverage/intensity persist, a downstream watch may be considered for parts of the region."
1461	22:17	Michigan (S), Indiana, Illinois (S), Missouri (E/C), Kentucky (N), Ohio (W)	Concerning: SVA #428, #429	"...instability lessens with eastward and southeastward extent east of the existing watches. Still, given the very well-organized nature of this convective system, an organized/bowing band is likely to continue east and southeast of the existing watches. While a severe risk should begin to diminish/become more isolated this evening, a new WW issuance -- into eastern lower Michigan and western Ohio, may be required. Some risk may also spread southeast of the existing watches across the Ohio River into northern Kentucky as well --- which could also require WW consideration." These eventually came into fruition as SVA #430 (1h:13m later) and SVA #431 (3h:47m later).
1464	00:29	Michigan (S), Indiana (S/E), Ohio (W), Illinois (S), Missouri (SE), Kentucky (W)	Concerning: SVA #428, #430, #431	"Latest radar loop shows the still-well-organized bowing MCS crossing the Midwest / Ohio Valley region. Some weakening has been noted over the past 1 to 2 hours with northern portions of the line -- i.e. lower Michigan, eastern Indiana, and now western Ohio. Here, weaker instability is indicated with eastward extent. Thus, while locally gusty/damaging winds will likely persist with stronger updrafts within the convective band, risk should remain limited and isolated for the next few hours, before further weakening occurs."

=== Highest recorded winds ===
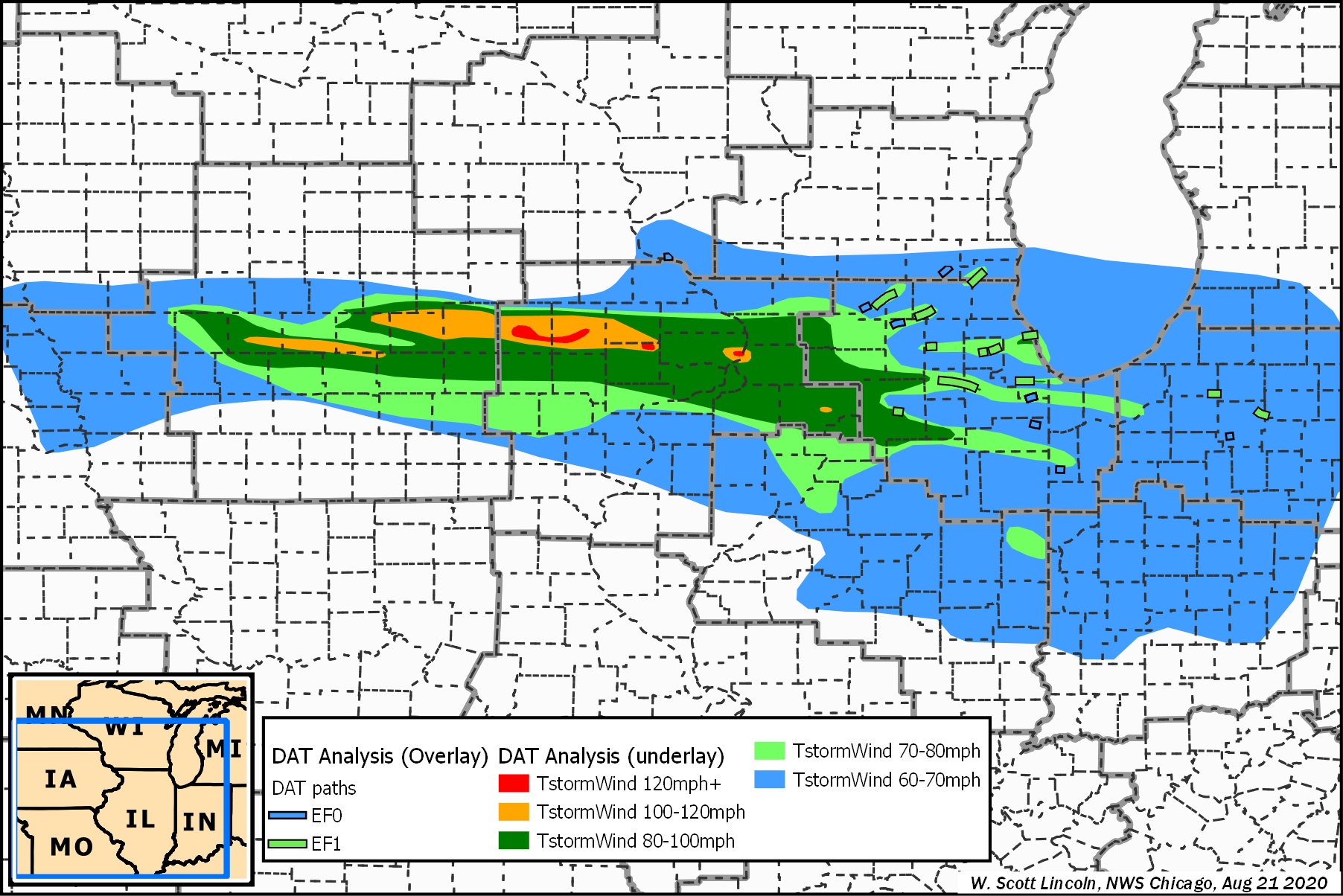
Damage survey results from multiple National Weather Service offices detailing the wind damage patterns from the derecho. (Dated August 21, 2020)

Recording Location	Peak Wind Gust Speed	Recorded By
Cedar Rapids, Iowa	(est.) 140 mph (225 km/h; 62.6 m/s)	NWS Storm Survey
Marion, Iowa (Note: In vicinity.)	(est.) 130 mph (209 km/h; 58.1 m/s)	NWS Storm Survey
Atkins, Iowa	126 mph (203 km/h; 56.3 m/s)	Personal Station
Midway, Iowa	112 mph (180 km/h; 50 m/s)	
Le Grand, Iowa	106 mph (171 km/h; 47 m/s)	Mesonet - Personal Station
Hiawatha, Iowa	100 mph (160 km/h; 45 m/s)	
Forreston, Illinois	(est.) 100 mph (160 km/h; 45 m/s)	NWS Storm Survey
Marshalltown, Iowa (Airport)	99 mph (159 km/h; 44 m/s)	ASOS
Albion, Iowa	99 mph (159 km/h; 44 m/s)	
Marshalltown, Iowa	(est.) 90–95 mph (145–153 km/h; 40–42 m/s)	Iowa DOT, Storm spotter, Storm chaser
Dixon, Illinois	92 mph (148 km/h; 41 m/s)	Mesonet - Personal Station
Cedar Point, Illinois	91 mph (146 km/h; 41 m/s)	Storm spotter
Atkins, Iowa	90 mph (140 km/h; 40 m/s)	
Blairstown, Iowa	90 mph (140 km/h; 40 m/s)	
Glen Ellyn, Illinois	(est.) 90 mph (140 km/h; 40 m/s)	NWS Storm Survey
Harvey, Illinois	(est.) 90 mph (140 km/h; 40 m/s)	NWS Storm Survey
Ottawa, Illinois	(est.) 90 mph (140 km/h; 40 m/s)	NWS Storm Survey
Davenport, Iowa (Airport)	87 mph (140 km/h; 39 m/s)	ASOS
Chicago (Lincoln Square)	85 mph (137 km/h; 38 m/s)	Mesonet - Personal Station
Neal Smith National Wildlife Refuge	85 mph (137 km/h; 38 m/s)	RAWS
Urbandale, Iowa	85 mph (137 km/h; 38 m/s)	Mesonet - Personal Station
Elkhart, Iowa	85 mph (137 km/h; 38 m/s)	Mesonet - Personal Station
Moline, Illinois	85 mph (137 km/h; 38 m/s)	Iowa DOT
Plainfield, Illinois	84 mph (135 km/h; 38 m/s)	Mesonet - Personal Station
Iowa City, Iowa (Airport)	82 mph (132 km/h; 37 m/s)	ASOS
South Pekin, Illinois	80 mph (130 km/h; 36 m/s)	
Colfax, Iowa	(est.) 80 mph (130 km/h; 36 m/s)	General Public
Mendota, Illinois	(est.) 80 mph (130 km/h; 36 m/s)	NWS Employee
Des Moines, IA (Airport)	(est.) 75–80 mph (120–130 km/h; 34–36 m/s)	ASOS, Storm spotter
Quad Cities (Airport)	79 mph (127 km/h; 35 m/s)	ASOS
Ankeny, IA (Airport)	78 mph (126 km/h; 35 m/s)	AWOS
Hubbard, Iowa	77 mph (120 km/h; 34 m/s)	CWOP
Leighton, Iowa	75 mph (120 km/h; 34 m/s)	Mesonet - Personal Station
Lee, Illinois	(est.) 75 mph (120 km/h; 34 m/s)	Storm spotter
Kentland, Indiana	73 mph (120 km/h; 33 m/s)	Mesonet - Personal Station
Chicago (Midway)	72.5 mph (117 km/h; 32.4 m/s)	
Cedar Rapids, Iowa (Airport)	68 mph (109 km/h; 30 m/s)	ASOS
Spring Bay, Illinois	65 mph (105 km/h; 29 m/s)	
Morton, Illinois	65 mph (105 km/h; 29 m/s)	
Bloomington, Illinois	64 mph (103 km/h; 29 m/s)	
Chicago (O'Hare)	62 mph (100 km/h; 28 m/s)	

== Confirmed tornadoes ==
Confirmed tornadoes by Enhanced Fujita rating
EFU	EF0	EF1	EF2	EF3	EF4	EF5	Total
4	9	13	0	0	0	0	26

List of confirmed tornadoes – Monday, August 10, 2020 (Note: All dates are based on the time zone where the tornado touched down; however, all times are in Coordinated Universal Time for consistency.)
EF#	Location	County / Parish	State	Start Coord.	Time (UTC)	Path length	Max width	Summary
EFU	SW of LaMoille	Marshall	IA	42.0016°N 93.0701°W	16:30–16:31	1.03 mi (1.66 km)	50 yd (46 m)	A brief tornado occurred on the leading edge of the derecho. No damage was found.
EFU	NE of Minerva	Marshall	IA	42.125°N 93.0683°W	16:36–16:37	0.42 mi (0.68 km)	50 yd (46 m)	A brief tornado occurred in cropland. No damage was found.
EF1	SSE of Albion to NNW of Marshalltown	Marshall	IA	42.0907°N 92.9778°W	16:39–16:42	2.88 mi (4.63 km)	100 yd (91 m)	Most of the damage done was to crops and trees. Some homes had minor damage.
EFU	SE of Gladbrook	Tama	IA	42.1598°N 92.6208°W	17:01–17:02	1.48 mi (2.38 km)	40 yd (37 m)	Convergent path in fields were found. No damage occurred.
EFU	N of Cedar Rapids Airport	Linn	IA	41.9063°N 91.729°W	17:31–17:32	0.92 mi (1.48 km)	40 yd (37 m)	A path through cropland was found on satellite imagery, ahead of a larger swath of wind damage, but no damage could be attributed to the tornado itself.
EF0	SSW of Burton	Grant	WI	42.694°N 90.8312°W	17:32–17:34	0.55 mi (0.89 km)	50 yd (46 m)	A high-end EF0 tornado damaged two outbuildings, power lines, and hardwood trees.
EF0 (Note: The listed rating for this tornado is EF0, but the event narrative describes an EFU rating.)	WSW of Florence to WSW of Freeport	Stephenson	IL	42.2119°N 89.6884°W	19:12–19:17	4.59 mi (7.39 km)	50 yd (46 m)	A path through cropland was found on satellite imagery ahead of a larger swath of wind damage, but no damage could be attributed to the tornado itself.
EF0	Western Rockford	Winnebago	IL	42.2495°N 89.1332°W	19:37–19:38	1.8 mi (2.9 km)	50 yd (46 m)	First of two tornadoes to strike Rockford. Some trees were damaged along the path.
EF1	Northeastern Rockford to Caledonia	Winnebago, Boone	IL	42.2806°N 89.022°W	19:47–20:05	9.18 mi (14.77 km)	300 yd (270 m)	Second of two tornadoes to strike Rockford. Trees and tree limbs were downed in the northeastern part of Rockford, with significant tree damage occurring in a localized area just east of Rock Valley College. Homes, apartment buildings, and businesses sustained roof, siding, and shingle damage. Numerous utility poles were downed as well, and tree limbs were downed in Caledonia before the tornado dissipated.
EF0	Fairdale to W of Colvin Park	DeKalb	IL	42.0962°N 88.9266°W	19:50–19:57	6.28 mi (10.11 km)	40 yd (37 m)	A utility pole was snapped, trees were damaged, and a plastic covering was ripped off a greenhouse. A convergent pattern was left in flattened corn fields.
EF1	Ottawa	LaSalle	IL	41.353°N 88.844°W	19:59–20:01	0.9 mi (1.4 km)	150 yd (140 m)	This high-end EF1 tornado ripped well-anchored roofing material off of businesses in town, and snapped a power pole was at its base. Shingles were ripped off of homes and businesses just west of IL 23. One roof, torn from a business, struck another building. Trees were shredded as well, with one tree limb significantly damaging a pickup truck.
EF1	SE of Marengo	McHenry	IL	42.1808°N 88.6548°W	20:05–20:11	5.73 mi (9.22 km)	200 yd (180 m)	Mainly tree damage occurred, although one single family home and farm sheds were heavily damaged. Corn was flattened in a convergent pattern and two utility poles were left leaning.
EF1	ENE of Maple Park to S of Virgil	Kane	IL	41.9173°N 88.5605°W	20:12–20:14	1.21 mi (1.95 km)	40 yd (37 m)	A narrow swath of corn was flattened in a convergent pattern. A barn lost nearly all of its roof.
EF1	Southern Yorkville to Plainfield	Kendall, Will	IL	41.6212°N 88.455°W	20:15–20:30	14.45 mi (23.26 km)	250 yd (230 m)	As the tornado touched down on the far southern side of Yorkville, it destroyed a pergola, ripped siding off a house, and threw fencing and parts of a tree over a roadway. Trees were also damaged as the tornado crossed IL 126. The tornado reached peak intensity as it mangled trees, destroyed a farm building, and bent a large grain bin inward. Wood panels thrown by the tornado left scour marks in the ground. Six power poles were snapped, and a 1,000–1,500 lb (450–680 kg) auger was moved 50 ft (15 m). The tornado then weakened as it entered Plainfield, causing tree, fence, and siding damage. The tornado lifted just before reaching I-55, although damaging winds of up to 82 miles per hour (130 kilometers per hour; 37 meters per second) continued to damage trees and roofs into the Crest Hill community.
EF1	Wheaton	DuPage	IL	41.8673°N 88.1038°W	20:35–20:36	0.36 mi (0.58 km)	100 yd (91 m)	A 50 ft (15 m) tall church steeple was knocked down, by this short-lived, low-end EF1 tornado. Trees were also damaged nearby on the campus of Wheaton College. Damaging winds of up to 90 miles per hour (140 kilometers per hour; 40 meters per second) caused damage in nearby Glen Ellyn after the tornado dissipated.
EF0	Lake Geneva	Walworth	WI	42.5568°N 88.4463°W	20:38–20:42	3.29 mi (5.29 km)	50 yd (46 m)	Large limbs and tree trunks were knocked down or snapped and house sustained minor damage in a residential area before the tornado reached its peak intensity as it crossed WS 120. Numerous trees were snapped, a building sustained roof and siding damage, and a car was splattered with debris. The tornado then quickly weakened and dissipated after crossing over US 12.
EF1	N of Lombard to N of Villa Park	DuPage	IL	41.8851°N 88.0166°W	20:39–20:42	2.15 mi (3.46 km)	200 yd (180 m)	This tornado came from the same storm that produced the Wheaton tornado. More than 200 homes were damaged, some of which sustained significant roof damage. Trees were snapped or uprooted, including some that landed on and caused damage to homes.
EF1	SSW of Camp Lake, WI to Salem	Lake (IL), Kenosha (WI)	IL, WI	42.475°N 88.1895°W	20:41–20:50	6.25 mi (10.06 km)	150 yd (140 m)	In Illinois, the tornado damaged the roofs of homes, snapped or uprooted trees, and wrapped metal roofing from outbuildings around trees. The tornado weakened as it entered Wisconsin, where additional tree damage occurred and multiple homes sustained shingle and siding damage in the Camp Lake area. The tornado then crossed Camp Lake, toppling pontoon boats and docks.
EF1	Oak Forest to WSW of Posen	Cook	IL	41.618°N 87.7868°W	20:54–20:59	4.84 mi (7.79 km)	300 yd (270 m)	Trees were uprooted and snapped. Two utility poles were snapped at the base and fences were blown down. Minor structural damage occurred.
EF0	Park Forest	Cook	IL	41.4693°N 87.7017°W	20:57–20:59	1.97 mi (3.17 km)	350 yd (320 m)	This high-end EF0 tornado caused mainly tree damage, including one tree that fell on a house.
EF1	Lincolnwood to Northern Chicago	Cook	IL	42.0087°N 87.724°W	20:59–21:04	3.19 mi (5.13 km)	300 yd (270 m)	A high-end EF1 tornado was caught on video lofting debris as it moved through the Rogers Park neighborhood in Chicago. Trees were snapped or uprooted, a metal light post was snapped at its base, wooden power poles were left leaning, some buildings sustained roof damage, and numerous cars were damaged or destroyed by falling trees and limbs. The tornado lifted as it moved over Lake Michigan.
EF0	Grant Park	Kankakee	IL	41.2431°N 87.6638°W	21:04–21:06	1.47 mi (2.37 km)	150 yd (140 m)	Trees and crops were damaged outside of town before the tornado moved through it. The tornado itself downed damaged numerous trees, with some snapped and uprooted; damaged a utility pole and crops; and caused minor roof damage to a house.
EF0	S of Ade	Newton	IN	41.8507°N 85.4421°W	22:15–22:16	0.86 mi (1.38 km)	40 yd (37 m)	One metal farm building had a portion of its roof peeled back and another had its doors blown out. Corn was flattened in a convergent pattern.
EF1	SE of Wyatt to SW of Wakarusa	St. Joseph	IN	41.5076°N 86.1222°W	22:32–22:37	2.41 mi (3.88 km)	100 yd (91 m)	This high-end EF1 tornado was embedded in a much larger swath of damaging winds. Grain bins were toppled, several farm outbuildings were significantly damaged or destroyed, trees were damaged, and crops were flattened. A farmhouse had its brick chimney toppled over, and a utility pole was snapped. The tornado dissipated into a microburst that caused more damage farther east.
EF1	Mineral Springs to Webster Lake	Kosciusko	IN	41.3434°N 85.713°W	22:55–22:00	3.1 mi (5.0 km)	100 yd (91 m)	Trees were snapped as this tornado crossed SR 13. A church lost roof covering, and some homes were damaged as a result of fallen trees and branches. Some homes also had minor roof damage. The tornado lifted over Webster Lake.
EF0	S of Burket	Kosciusko	IN	41.139°N 85.9672°W	23:43–23:44	0.23 mi (0.37 km)	50 yd (46 m)	Some trees were damaged on properties. A 100–150 feet (30–46 m) circle of corn was flattened in a field.

== See also ==
- List of natural disasters in the United States
- List of derecho events
- Corn Belt derecho
- May 2009 Southern Midwest derecho
- July 2011 Midwest Derecho
- June 2012 North American derecho
- Severe weather sequence of July 13–16, 2024, which included a similar derecho affecting many of the same areas
- Tornadoes of 2020
