= Corn Belt derecho =

Weather event

Corn Belt Derecho
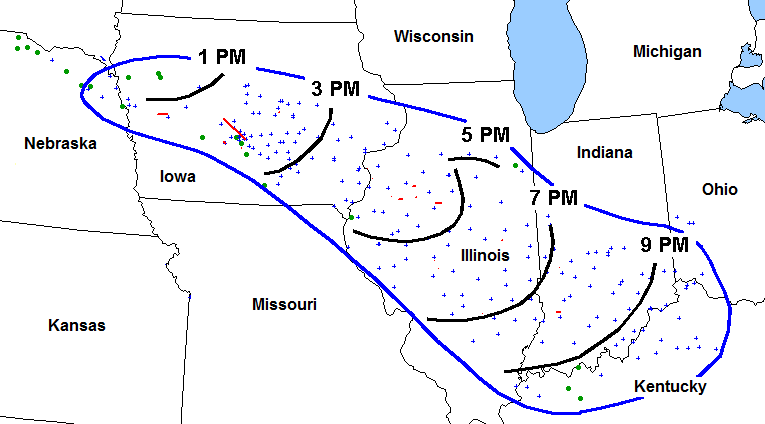
- Path of the Corn Belt Derecho.

- Storm front crossing Illinois (looped animation)
- Date(s): June 29, 1998
- Duration: ~10 hours (12:00 PM-10:00 PM)
- Track length: 600 mi (966 km)
- Peak wind gust (measured): 123 mph (198 km/h; 55.0 m/s) (Washington, Iowa)
- Largest hail: 2.5 in (6.3 cm) (Des Moines, Iowa)
- Tornado count: 19 (Crawford County, Iowa, Polk County, Iowa)
- Strongest tornado^{1}: F2 tornado
- Fatalities: None (at least 85 injured)
- Damage costs: $125 million
- Areas affected: Midwestern United States
- ^{1}Most severe tornado damage; see Fujita scale

The Corn Belt derecho was a progressive derecho which affected a large area of the central United States on June 29, 1998. In the morning, thunderstorms, including a supercell, developed over South Dakota and tracked into central Iowa. As the thunderstorms reached central Iowa, a strong rear-inflow jet developed which caused the thunderstorm to take on a different characteristic, becoming a derecho. It traveled more than 600 miles in about ten hours, causing more than $125 million worth of widespread destruction, especially to crops, and was responsible for power outages to nearly a half a million people.

== Meteorological synopsis ==
At 1200 UTC (7:00 am. CDT), a stationary front extended from South Dakota to Southern Michigan, bringing warm and humid air to its South. The temperature was around 25 °C (77 °F) at this early hour and the dew point was at 23 °C (73 °F). At 850 mb, the southwesterly flow was maintaining this situation while at higher levels the flow was turning to the northwest, bringing drier and colder air. Daytime heating would increase the instability of the airmass and the CAPE was expected to reach a strong 3,689 J/kg. At the same time, there was relatively weak synoptic-scale forcing, the surface flow being a barometric col.

Along the front in South Dakota, an unorganized area of thunderstorms formed by 9:00 a.m. CDT. They rapidly organized and spread along the front, moving east-southeast into northeast Nebraska. By midday, the storms reached northwestern and north central Iowa, supercells among them, while forming a west–east band and assuming a bow echo shape.

In the early afternoon, a second area of thunderstorms formed west of Des Moines and merged with the original bow echo line which then accelerated east-southeast into Illinois by 4:00 p.m. The line evolved into a classic large scale bow echo, showing a "book end vortex" on its northern end, becoming a progressive derecho. Damage, especially to crops and trees, became continuous from the Iowa border into Indiana as most of the damage was produced by strong straight-line winds on the leading edge of the gust front. Some embedded supercells, showing smaller-scale vortices on radars, produced narrower corridors of more intense damage, with measured wind gusts up to at least 110 miles per hour (180 km/h).

The derecho crossed central and southern Indiana during the early to mid evening while its highest wind gusts decreased somewhat compared with those observed earlier in the day. The system became a roughly west–east arc and turned more southward as it moved into Kentucky by late evening, dissipating gradually

== Impact ==
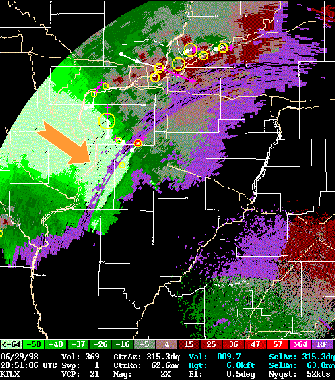
Radar velocity display across southeastern Iowa into far western Illinois at 3:51 p.m. CDT, June 29, 1998.

By the end of the morning, the thunderstorms produced hail up to the size of hen's eggs and locally damaging wind in Nebraska. By mid-day, supercells along the bow echo in Iowa began to produce very strong winds, up to tennis ball-sized hail, and several mostly short-lived tornadoes. On Doppler weather radar, a large fast-moving mesocyclone associated of the track of a supercell was nearly in contact with the ground as it moved from southwest Boone County east-southeast across the northern and eastern parts of the Des Moines metro area.

Over the Davenport, Iowa NWS Weather Office area of responsibility, numerous reports of wind gusts ranging from 80 to 100 mph were received. The highest measured wind gust of 123 mph (198 km/h) was reported in Washington, Iowa near coordinates 41.3°N 91.7°W. This was the highest unofficial recorded wind gust in the history of the state of Iowa until the August 2020 Midwest derecho. At the same moment, the area of green in the radar display to the right shows the velocities toward the weather radar. The lighter shade, beneath the orange arrow, represented Doppler-estimated mean wind speeds in excess of 64 knots (119 km/h) all along the gust front, and the yellow circle are mesocyclone detections.

In Illinois, railroad cars were toppled, steel power transmission towers were bent, and many buildings were seriously damaged during the afternoon. By the evening into Indiana, hundreds of trees were uprooted in the Bedford and Indianapolis areas, two semi-trailer trucks were blown off Interstate 65 near Columbus. By late evening, damage into Kentucky was minimal, mostly limited to toppled trees and several roofs blown off buildings and houses.

Along with the long-lived derecho, 19 tornadoes were reported, two of which were an F2 tornado. One of the F2 tornadoes struck Des Moines, injuring 85 people. Over eight states, the derecho and associated tornadoes killed one person and injured 174.

== Confirmed tornadoes ==
Confirmed tornadoes by Fujita rating
FU	F0	F1	F2	F3	F4	F5	Total
0	8	9	2	0	0	0	19

=== June 29 event ===
List of confirmed tornadoes – Monday, June 29, 1998 (Note: All dates are based on the local time zone where the tornado touched down; however, all times are in Coordinated Universal Time for consistency.)
F#	Location	County / Parish	State	Start Coord.	Time (UTC)	Path length	Max width
F2	S of Dow City to NW of Manilla	Crawford	IA	41.92°N 95.50°W	17:52–18:09	11 mi (18 km)	55 yd (50 m)
F2	This strong tornado destroyed multiple barns and outbuildings along its path, including at least one well-built barn that was completely leveled with debris scattered into nearby fields. Several homes sustained roof damage, with portions of roofs torn off, shingles removed, siding stripped, and windows shattered. Between 30 and 50 residences were damaged overall. Numerous trees were uprooted or snapped, creating widespread tree debris. Farm equipment was tossed, and at least one pickup truck was flipped over near a farmstead.						
F2	SE of Berkley to Johnston to Des Moines	Boone, Dallas, Polk	IA	41.92°N 94.08°W	18:20–19:05	34.1 mi (54.9 km)	150 yd (140 m)
F2	A strong, long-track tornado caused significant damage in rural areas along its path, including destroyed barns, grain bins, and outbuildings, as well as roof damage to several farm homes. Upon reaching the western suburbs and city of Des Moines, it caused major residential damage, including roofs torn off dozens of homes, walls collapsed, and garages destroyed. Vehicles were tossed or flipped, and many trees were snapped or uprooted, with tree debris blocking roads and downing power lines. Several commercial structures, including strip malls and small businesses, sustained roof and wall damage. Approximately 85 people were injured, primarily due to flying debris and broken glass. This is noted as a possible tornado family.						
F1	NW of De Soto	Dallas	IA	41.55°N 94.05°W	18:43–18:46	2 mi (3.2 km)	40 yd (37 m)
F1	This tornado mainly remained over open country.						
F1	E of Marshalltown	Marshall	IA	42.05°N 92.90°W	18:50–18:52	1 mi (1.6 km)	45 yd (41 m)
F1	A tornado tracked through a corn field and a grove of trees.						
F1	New Boston area	Mercer	IL	41.17°N 91°W	20:40	1 mi (1.6 km)	2 yd (1.8 m)
F1	$5,000 in property damages occurred.						
F0	Norwalk	Warren	IA	41.48°N 93.68°W	20:50	0.1 mi (0.16 km)	25 yd (23 m)
F0	A brief tornado occurred.						
F0	E of Roseville	Warren	IL	40.73°N 90.52°W	21:08	1 mi (1.6 km)	2 yd (1.8 m)
F0	$2,000 in property damages occurred.						
F1	ENE of Avon to NNE of Ellisville	Fulton	IL	40.68°N 90.37°W	21:09–21:12	5 mi (8.0 km)	400 yd (370 m)
F1	A tornado touched down near Avon, travelling to the east-southeast. Initial damage occurred at a farmstead with damage to a barn. A farm house was damaged, ripping off part of the roof, part of the siding, and moving it off the foundation. Damage also occurred to a nearby soybean field. The tornado lifted briefly then touched down again, damaging a machine shed and a horse barn. Numerous trees were also damaged along the tornado's path.						
F1	S of Williamsfield	Knox	IL	40.88°N 90.07°W	21:20–21:22	3 mi (4.8 km)	200 yd (180 m)
F1	This tornado destroyed a steel corn crib and blew down a large tree which damaged a home. Also, several windows were blown out on the home. As the tornado travelled east it caused major tree damage for a mile. Then it blew a large tree onto another home and destroyed an empty silo. Next it destroyed a barn and two outbuildings, knocked yet another tree onto a home, as well as, breaking several windows and blowing several 2x4s into the home. Further down the road, the roof and east walls of two homes were destroyed. Then for the last half of a mile, ten power poles were blown down, as well as, numerous trees and a barn sustained moderate damage. One woman sustained minor injuries from flying glass.						
F1	Farmington	Fulton, Peoria	IL	40.70°N 90.02°W	21:22–21:24	1.5 mi (2.4 km)	100 yd (91 m)
F1	A tornado touched down on the west side of Farmington and travelled through town. It first severely damaged a lumberyard, ripping off the roof of a large storage facility. Then as it moved into the downtown area, several buildings sustained damage to the back walls, as well as, roof damage. Also, several projectiles were found in this are, specifically 2x4s driven into the ground. A block down the road a house lost its roof and then as the tornado moved into the east side of town, the second story of a brick building was demolished. Across the street at the high school, a large garage was destroyed which damaged several vehicles. Also, the gymnasium sustained significant roof and water damage and the new press box and bleachers at the football stadium were destroyed. As the tornado lifted on the east side of town, it blew down or damaged numerous trees.						
F1	W of Bald Bluff	Henderson	IL	41.02°N 90.9°W	21:35	1 mi (1.6 km)	100 yd (91 m)
F1	$15,000 in property damages occurred.						
F0	S of Norwalk	Warren	IA	41.45°N 93.68°W	21:43	0.2 mi (0.32 km)	30 yd (27 m)
F0	A brief tornado occurred.						
F1	Marquette Heights to Morton	Tazewell	IL	40.62°N 89.60°W	21:45–21:52	8.5 mi (13.7 km)	100 yd (91 m)
F1	This tornado formed in Marquette Heights, blowing down numerous trees and power lines as it travelled to the east southeast. When the tornado reached the Groveland area, numerous homes sustained minor to moderate damage and part of the canopy over the gas pumps at a convenience store was blown down. As the tornado reached the southwestern side of Morton it intensified. It caused considerable damage to a 30 store shopping center, tearing half the roof off and breaking windows. In this same area it also caused moderate damage to a cinema, several restaurants, and other businesses. Then the tornado moved into a residential area causing light to moderate damage to around 24 homes, mainly roof damage, before lifting and dissipating.						
F0	S of Springfield	Sangamon	IL	39.7°N 89.65°W	22:30	0.1 mi (0.16 km)	10 yd (9.1 m)
F0	An off-duty police officer witnessed a brief tornado pull a tree out of the ground.						
F0	Northern Pawnee	Sangamon	IL	39.58°N 89.58°W	22:36–22:37	0.5 mi (0.80 km)	40 yd (37 m)
F0	A weak tornado touched down on the northside of Pawnee, where it blew the roof off of a house and twisted it on its foundation. Some debris from the house was driven into the roof of the garage on the house next door. The tornado continued for about half a mile before lifting and dissipating knocking down several trees.						
F0	Western Tolono	Champaign	IL	39.98°N 88.27°W	22:58–22:59	0.6 mi (0.97 km)	20 yd (18 m)
F0	This tornado briefly touched down in Tolono. It travelled to the east southeast for about half a mile knocking down numerous trees, tree limbs, and power lines before lifting and dissipating. A few of the trees landed on homes causing light to moderate damage.						
F0	Brazil area	Clay	IN	39.5°N 87.13°W	00:05–00:08	1 mi (1.6 km)	75 yd (69 m)
F0	A weak tornado caused minor house damage and major tree damage.						
F1	NE of Farina	Fayette	IL	38.85°N 88.73°W	00:20–00:22	0.2 mi (0.32 km)	75 yd (69 m)
F1	A tornado caused damage at a farm, ripping the roof off a large machine shed, destroying a grain bin, uprooting trees and snapping large tree limbs. A house suffered minor damage to the siding and a broken window.						
F0	Edwardsport area	Knox, Daviess	IN	38.82°N 87.13°W	00:58–01:02	1.2 mi (1.9 km)	75 yd (69 m)
F0	A weak tornado caused minor house damage and major tree damage.						

== See also ==
- List of derecho events
- Tornadoes of 1998
- August 2020 Midwest derecho
