= Midway, Linn County, Iowa =

Midway, Iowa
- Unincorporated community
- Location within Iowa Location within the United States
- Coordinates: 42°06′22″N 91°41′49″W
- Country: United States
- State: Iowa
- County: Linn
- Township: Monroe
- Elevation: 840 ft (260 m)
- Time zone: UTC-6 (Central (CST))
  - Summer (DST): UTC-5 (CDT)
- Area code: 319
- GNIS feature ID: 459067

Midway is an unincorporated community in Linn County, Iowa, United States. Midway is located in Monroe Township on the north edge of the city of Robins and is 9 miles (14 km) north of Cedar Rapids.
