= July 2011 Midwest derecho =

Weather event

- Radar loop of the derecho (Click to animate)
- Date(s): July 11, 2011
- Duration: 18 hours
- Peak wind gust (measured): 130 mph (209 km/h; 58.1 m/s) (Vinton, Iowa)
- Tornado count: 1
- Strongest tornado^{1}: EF0 tornado
- Fatalities: 1
- Areas affected: Iowa, Illinois, Michigan, Ohio
- ^{1}Most severe tornado damage; see Enhanced Fujita scale

A destructive derecho event struck the states of Iowa, Illinois, Michigan, and Ohio on July 11, 2011, and was the most damaging portion of a much larger derecho event. It started on the morning of July 11, 2011, when a powerful long-lasting straight-line windstorm, known as a derecho, developed over central Iowa and carved a path of extensive damage across east central Iowa. The storms first took shape as a cluster of low-end severe storms over Southern Nebraska during the late afternoon of July 10. The system continued northeastward and entered western Iowa at 1:00 a.m, still only as a marginal line of severe storms. As the system passed through the Northern Des Moines metro area at 3:30 a.m., it interacted with an outflow boundary from the storms to the north and rapidly intensified as it accelerated eastward. Over the next hour and a half the storm plowed eastward through Story, Marshall, and Tama Counties, blasting the area with winds of up to 105 miles per hour (169 km/h). The storm continued to track eastward, plowing through eastern Iowa and the Southern Great Lakes region before dissipating in West Virginia in the mid-afternoon. Thousands of trees were downed in western Iowa alone, and numerous structures were either damaged or destroyed. The peak winds were estimated to be in the range of 130 miles per hour (210 km/h), equal to a Category 4 hurricane. One man was killed in Grand Rapids, Michigan due to a falling tree.

Shortly after this complex, a major heat wave would affect the eastern half of the continent, with another significant derecho event occurring on July 17, 2011, over Ontario, Quebec and Northern New England.

== Iowa ==
The derecho started around 3:20 a.m. on Monday morning just north of Des Moines and ended around 18 hours later somewhere in the Atlantic Ocean. In Iowa, wind speeds topped out at 130 miles per hour (210 km/h) around Vinton and Garrison.

In Garrison, straight line wind of 110–130 miles per hour (180–210 km/h) produced widespread damage to structures. Many roofs were partially or fully removed and the walls of some buildings collapsed, including the fire station and town library. Nearly every tree was significantly damaged or snapped off. Power outages were widespread.

At Vinton, straight line wind in excess of 110 miles per hour (180 km/h) caused damage to numerous roof structures and some exterior walls, including a downtown apartment building. Nearly every tree was significantly damaged or snapped off. The Iowa Braille and Sight Saving School was also severely damaged. The local high school was utilized as an emergency shelter for two or three days after the storm until power was restored throughout the community. The building which housed several newspapers produced locally was damaged and forced the operation to be relocated for several months. In the Dudgeon Lake Wildlife Management Area across the Cedar River north of Vinton, extensive damage was left in the wake of the derecho with more than half of the trees badly damaged. Some estimated it would take 500 years for the area to fully recover.

== Illinois ==
During the morning hours of July 11, 2011, the line of severe thunderstorms moved very quickly across Northern Illinois and Southern Lake Michigan, producing widespread wind damage. In addition, the strong thunderstorm winds with this system generated a classic seiche event on the lake. A seiche is a situation where lake water ahead of the storms is piled up along the downwind shore (in this case Indiana and Michigan) and then sloshes back and forth across the lake for several hours.

In Chicago, this derecho injured six people in the collapse of a festival tent and left more than 860,000 people without electricity.

== Confirmed tornadoes ==
Confirmed tornadoes by Enhanced Fujita rating
| EFU | EF0 | EF1 | EF2 | EF3 | EF4 | EF5 | Total |
|---|---|---|---|---|---|---|---|
| 0 | 1 | 0 | 0 | 0 | 0 | 0 | 1 |

List of confirmed tornadoes – Monday, July 11, 2011 (Note: All dates are based on the local time zone where the tornado touched down; however, all times are in Coordinated Universal Time for consistency.)
| EF# | Location | County / Parish | State | Start Coord. | Time (UTC) | Path length | Max width | Summary |
|---|---|---|---|---|---|---|---|---|
| EF0 | SE of Moorland | Webster | IA | 42.42°N 94.28°W | 07:52–07:56 | 2.21 miles (3.56 km) | 50 yards (46 m) | Intermittent tornado touchdown with damage to crops. |

== See also ==
- List of derecho events
- Tornadoes of 2011
- June 2012 North American derecho
- August 2020 Midwest derecho
