= Monroe Township, Linn County, Iowa =

Township in Linn County, Iowa, U.S.

Coordinates: 42.0778°N 91.7150°W

Monroe Township is a township in Linn County, Iowa.

== History ==
Monroe Township was organized in 1849.
