= NOAA's Environmental Real-time Observation Network =

US weather observation network

The NOAA Environmental Real-time Observation Network (NERON) is a project to establish a nationwide network of high quality near real-time weather monitoring stations across the United States. A 20-mile by 20-mile grid has been established, with the hopes of having one observation system within each grid cell. Effort is being put forth by local National Weather Service (NWS) offices and other state climate groups to ensure that sites in the network meet important criteria. The network will be composed of existing, and in some cases upgraded, sites (ASOS, Cooperative Observer, etc.) as well as new sites being established for other local and state efforts. Many stations in New England and New York have already been installed.

== See also ==
- Citizen Weather Observer Program (CWOP)
- Community Collaborative Rain, Hail and Snow Network (CoCoRaHS)
- Mesonet
