= Meteorological instrumentation =

Measuring device used in meteorology

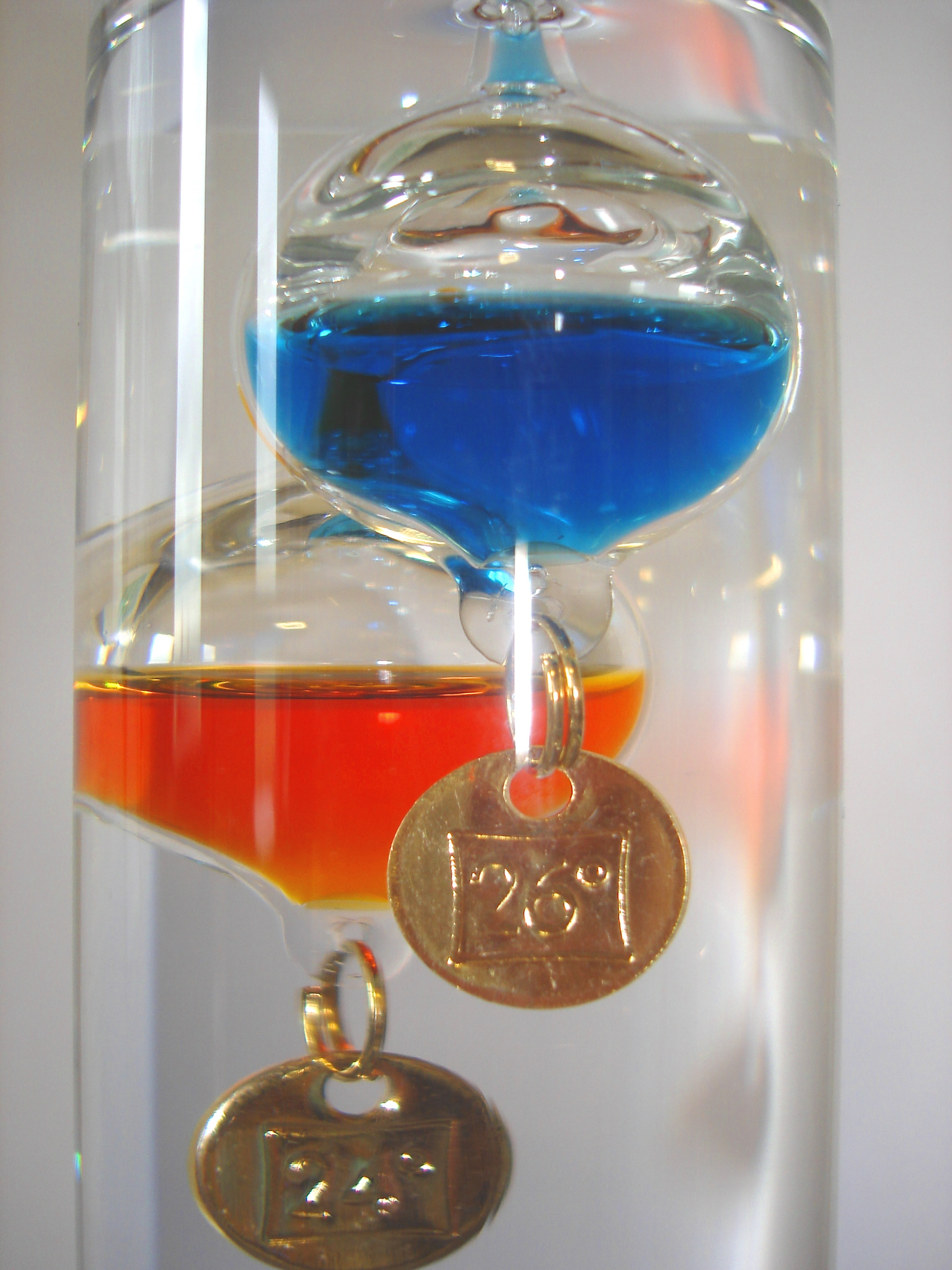
Galileo thermometer

Meteorological instruments (or weather instruments), including meteorological sensors (weather sensors), are the equipment used to find the state of the atmosphere at a given time. Each science has its own unique sets of laboratory equipment. Meteorology, however, is a science which does not use much laboratory equipment but relies more on on-site observation and remote sensing equipment. In science, an observation, or observable, is an abstract idea that can be measured and for which data can be taken. Rain was one of the first quantities to be measured historically. Two other accurately measured weather-related variables are wind and humidity. Many attempts had been made prior to the 15th century to construct adequate equipment to measure atmospheric variables.

== History ==
The first devices used to measure weather phenomena were the rain gauge, the anemometer and the hygrometer. The 17th century saw the development of the barometer and the Galileo thermometer while the 18th century saw the development of the thermometer with the Fahrenheit and Celsius scales. The 20th century developed new remote sensing tools, such as weather radars, weather satellites and wind profilers, which provide better sampling both regionally and globally. Remote sensing instruments collect data from weather events some distance from the instrument and typically stores the data where the instrument is located and often transmits the data at defined intervals to central data centers.

In 1441, King Sejong's son, Prince Munjong, invented the first standardized rain gauge. These were sent throughout the Joseon dynasty of South Korea as an official tool to assess land taxes based upon a farmer's potential harvest. In 1450, Leone Battista Alberti developed a swinging-plate anemometer, and is known as the first anemometer. In 1607, Galileo Galilei constructs a thermoscope. In 1643, Evangelista Torricelli invents the mercury barometer. In 1662, Sir Christopher Wren invented the mechanical, self-emptying, tipping bucket rain gauge. In 1714, Gabriel Fahrenheit creates a reliable scale for measuring temperature with a mercury-type thermometer. In 1742, Anders Celsius, a Swedish astronomer, proposed the 'centigrade' temperature scale, the predecessor of the current Celsius scale. In 1783, the first hair hygrometer is demonstrated by Horace-Bénédict de Saussure. In 1806, Francis Beaufort introduced his system for classifying wind speeds. The April 1960 launch of the first successful weather satellite, TIROS-1, marked the beginning of the age where weather information became available globally.

This was also used to measure the temperature of the surrounding air.

== Types ==
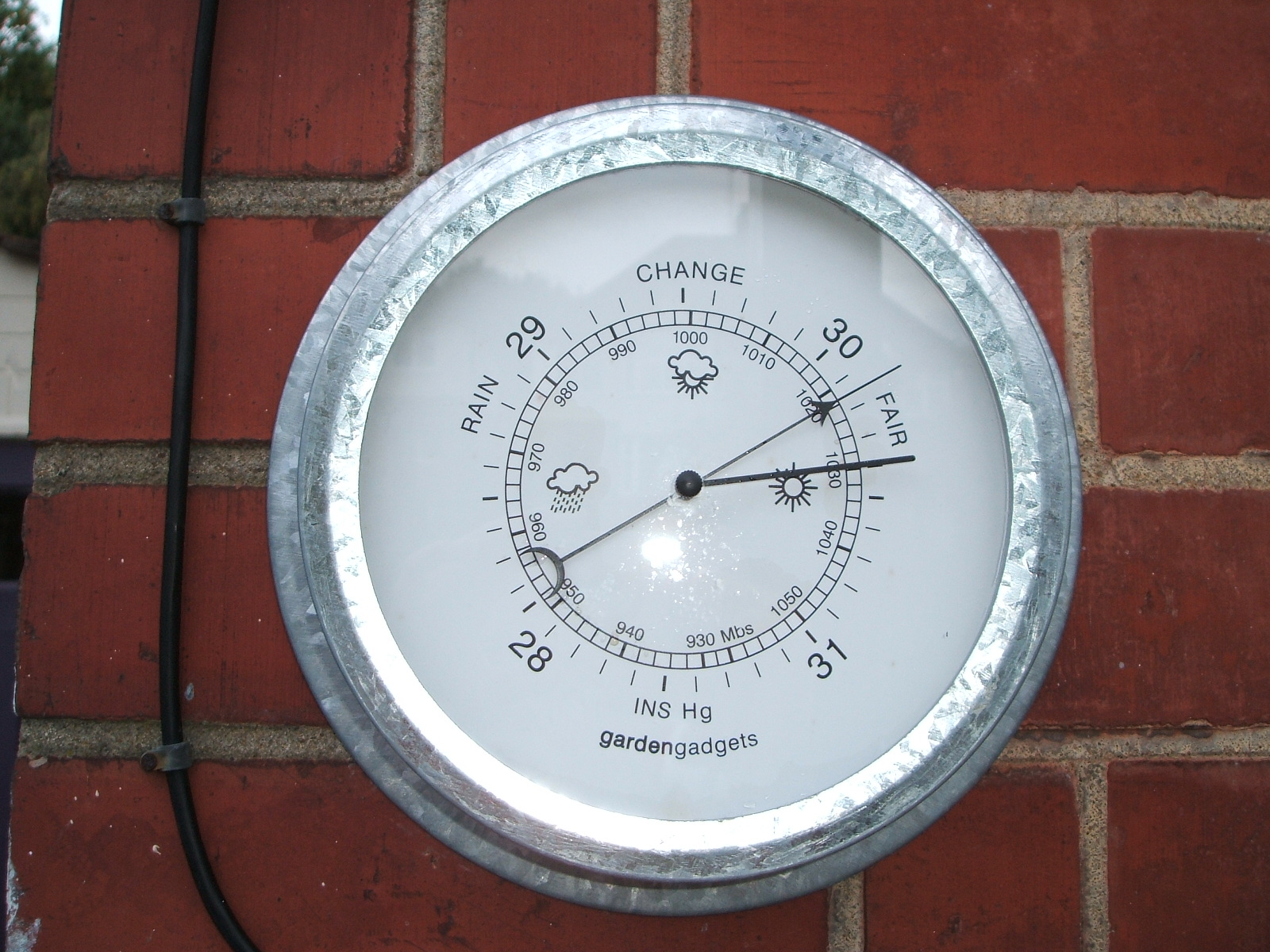
Modern 2020 aneroid barometer

A thermometer measures air temperature, or the kinetic energy of the molecules within air. A barometer measures atmospheric pressure, or the pressure exerted by the weight of the Earth's atmosphere above a particular location. An anemometer measures the wind speed and the direction the wind is blowing from at the site where it is mounted. A hygrometer measures the relative humidity at a location, which can then be used to compute the dew point. Radiosondes directly measure most of these quantities, except for wind, which is determined by tracking the radiosonde signal with an antenna or theodolite. Supplementing the radiosondes a network of aircraft collection is organized by the World Meteorological Organization (WMO), which also use these instruments to report weather conditions at their respective locations. A sounding rocket or rocketsonde, sometimes called a research rocket, is an instrument-carrying rocket designed to take measurements and perform scientific experiments during its suborbital flight.

A pyranometer is a type of actinometer used to measure broadband solar irradiance on a planar surface and is a sensor that is designed to measure the solar radiation flux density (in watts per metre square) from a field of view of 180 degrees. A ceilometer is a device that uses a laser or other light source to determine the height of a cloud base. Ceilometers can also be used to measure the aerosol concentration within the atmosphere. A ceiling balloon is used by meteorologists to determine the height of the base of clouds above ground level during daylight hours. The principle behind the ceiling balloon is a balloon with a known ascent rate (how fast it climbs) and determining how long the balloon rises until it disappears into the cloud. Ascent rate times ascent time yields the ceiling height. A disdrometer is an instrument used to measure the drop size distribution and velocity of falling hydrometeors. Rain gauges are used to measure the precipitation which falls at any point on the Earth's landmass.

Remote sensing, as used in meteorology, is the concept of collecting data from remote weather events and subsequently producing weather information. Each remote sensing instrument collects data about the atmosphere from a remote location and, usually, stores the data where the instrument is located. The most common types of remote sensing are radar, lidar, and satellites (also photogrammetry). The main uses of radar are to collect information concerning the coverage and characteristics of precipitation and wind. Satellites are chiefly used to determine cloud cover, as well as wind. SODAR (SOnic Detection And Ranging) is a meteorological instrument as one form of wind profiler, which measures the scattering of sound waves by atmospheric turbulence. Sodar systems are used to measure wind speed at various heights above the ground, and the thermodynamic structure of the lower layer of the atmosphere. Radar and lidar are not passive because both use electromagnetic radiation to illuminate a specific portion of the atmosphere. Weather satellites along with more general-purpose Earth-observing satellites circling the earth at various altitudes have become an indispensable tool for studying a wide range of phenomena from forest fires to El Niño.

== Weather stations ==
A weather station is a facility with instruments and equipment to make observations of atmospheric conditions in order to provide information to make weather forecasts and to study the weather and climate. The measurements taken include temperature, barometric pressure, humidity, wind speed, wind direction, and precipitation amounts. Wind measurements are taken as free of other obstructions as possible, while temperature and humidity measurements are kept free from direct solar radiation, or insolation. Manual observations are taken at least once daily, while automated observations are taken at least once an hour.

== Surface weather observations ==
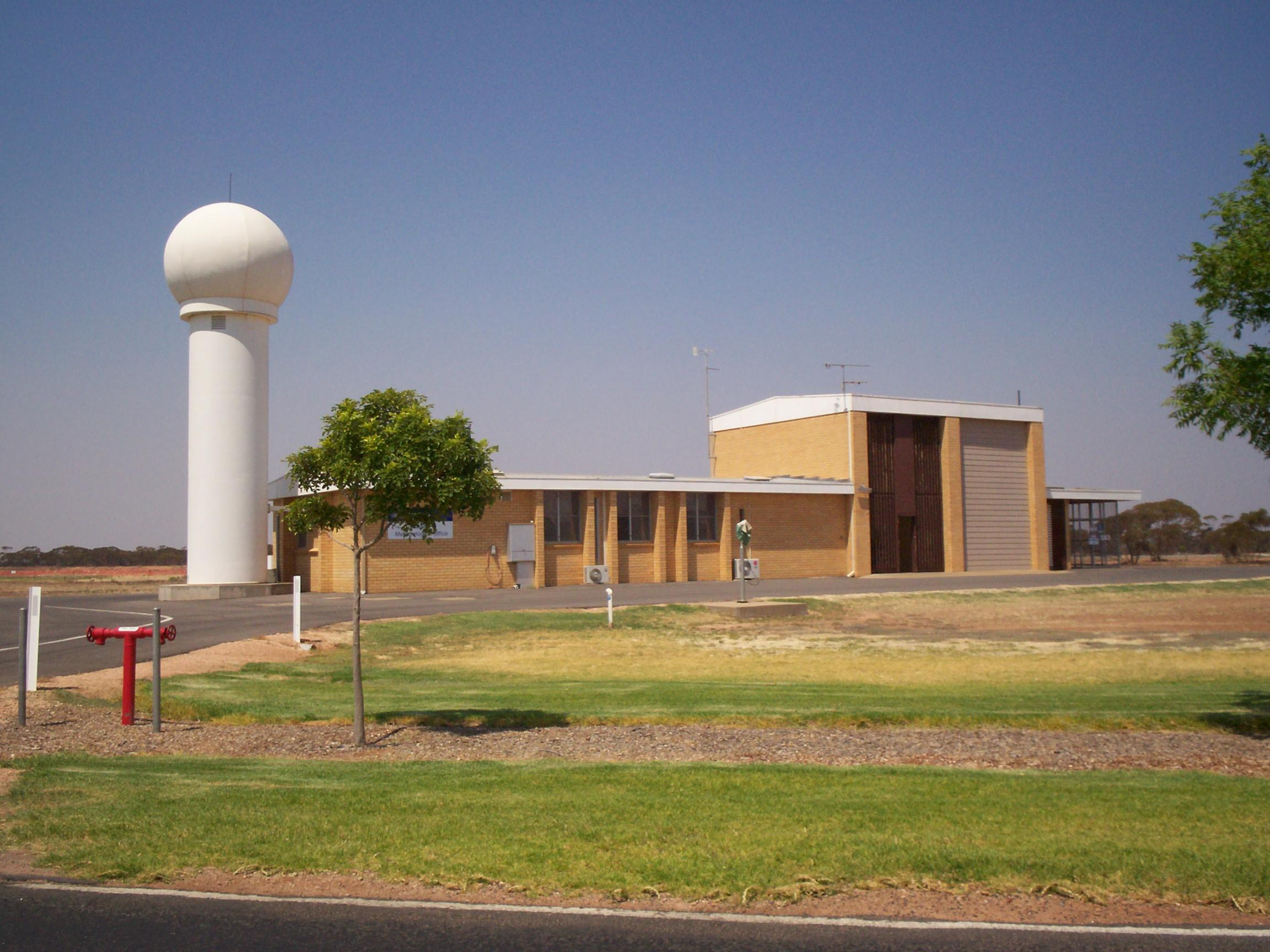
Weather station at Mildura Airport, Victoria, Australia.

Surface weather observations are the fundamental data used for safety as well as climatological reasons to forecast weather and issue warnings worldwide. They can be taken manually, by a weather observer, by computer through the use of automated weather stations, or in a hybrid scheme using weather observers to augment the otherwise automated weather station. The ICAO defines the International Standard Atmosphere, which is the model of the standard variation of pressure, temperature, density, and viscosity with altitude in the Earth's atmosphere, and is used to reduce a station pressure to sea level pressure. Airport observations can be transmitted worldwide through the use of the METAR observing code. Personal weather stations taking automated observations can transmit their data to the United States mesonet through the use of the Citizen Weather Observer Program (CWOP), or internationally through the Weather Underground Internet site. A thirty-year average of a location's weather observations is traditionally used to determine the station's climate.

== See also ==
- Mesomeric
- Weather balloon
- Wireless sensor network
