= Weather spotting =

Observing and reporting weather events

Weather spotting is observing weather for the purpose of reporting to a larger group or organization. Examples include National Weather Service (NWS) co-op observers and Skywarn storm spotters.

== Storm spotters ==
A storm spotter is a specific type of weather spotter. In the U.S., these volunteers are usually trained by the National Weather Service or local Skywarn group, and are given a phone number, internet outlet, or amateur radio frequency to report to if a severe weather event, such as a tornado, severe thunderstorm, or flash flood occurs where the spotter is located. They add ground truth information to remote sensing technology such as weather radar. Canwarn is the national storm spotting program of Canada, Skywarn Europe covers about a dozen countries (including the U.K., which is also covered by TORRO), Australia has a program organized by the Bureau of Meteorology called ASP (Australian Storm Spotters), while Malaysia has a community service oriented program called 'RakanMET' which allows public weather report and spotting.

== National Weather Service Coop Observers ==
The National Weather Service Cooperative Observer Program (COOP) is a network of around 11,000 volunteers that record official weather observations across the United States. Data is taken from a multitude of geographic regions and topography, and sent to the National Weather Service and National Climatic Data Center (NCDC) for official records. In making these reports, observers use a specialized set of jargon and slang to describe their observations.

Cooperative weather observers often double as storm spotters. Some are also river and coastal watchers, typically reporting gauge readings.

== Media weather spotters ==
Since New England experiences harsh winters, several regional television stations use weather spotters for up-to-date snowfall amounts and reports. WHDH-TV's network, launched by former meteorologist Todd Gross, is the largest in New England with close to 300 spotters. The former name of the group was "WHDHwx - The 7NEWS Weather Spotter Group." In December 2005, the group's name was switched to "NEWeather - Todd Gross' Weather Spotter Network", in light of Todd Gross' departure with Channel 7.

Al Kaprielian, former meteorologist for WNDS/WZMY-TV/WBIN-TV (now WWJE-DT), started his weather watcher group in 1986, when WNDS-TV first went on the air. Kaprielian featured one weather watcher per night on "my TV Prime," with their name, town, and current temperature on the map.

Other Boston-area stations with weather spotter networks include WBZ-TV, WCVB-TV, and WMUR-TV in Manchester, New Hampshire.

Media weather spotters are also extensive in the Midwest; though they also report severe warm weather, such as large hail and heavy rain. WFIE in Evansville, IN, for example, has a massive network of over 100 spotters. In the Great Plains and Southern US, many stations hire or contract storm chasers to send severe thunderstorm and tornado imagery to their viewers and listeners. Some TV stations fly helicopters to record such weather.

== Aviation ==
Accurate and timely weather information is crucial to safe flying operations. Large airports retain a staff of trained weather observers. Previously, many airports had such observers but automated systems replaced humans at most airports and airfields. The military, especially air forces and navies, also maintains such observers.

== See also ==
- Citizen Weather Observer Program (CWOP)
- Climatological observers link
- NOAA Hurricane Hunters
- 53d Weather Reconnaissance Squadron
