= Weather station "Taganrog" =

- Метеостанция "Таганрог" (Russian)
- Location within Rostov Oblast Location within Russia
- 47.2003°N 38.9231°E
- Location: 143, Shevchenko Street, Taganrog, Rostov oblast Russia

History
- Built: 1815

Weather station "Taganrog" (Russian: Метеостанция "Таганрог") is an institution created for carrying out weather observations. The current address is 143, Shevchenko Street, Taganrog, Rostov Region.

== History ==
In May 1815 in Taganrog was opened the first in the Azov Sea hydrometeorological station. It became possible due to the development of the city as a major port. It worked at the Taganrog Men's Gymnasium until April 1833.

In the 1870s, the weather station “Taganrog” was already located in the area of the Flagman descent. In 1880 it moved to the lighthouse yard after the lighthouse was built.

In the XVII century the institution had very primitive means. The collected information was first transmitted to the port office, then with the help of special signal flags information came to the ships standing on raid. When the telegraph was invented information reports began to arrive at the nearest ports. The weather was informed 8 times a day, the state of the sea - three times a day. Observation logs have been preserved according to which it is evident that observations were recorded in a calligraphic handwriting. The information was fixed about the amount of precipitation, sea surface and air temperature.

At the beginning of the 20th century, for the needs of a weather station began to use radio. The work of the institution was stopped in December 1917 after the October Revolution and in December 1921 during the Civil War.

The weather station in Taganrog suspended its work during the occupation of the city from October 1941 to August 1943.

In the 1970s, the weather station was located along 143, Shevchenko Street where it is located in the 21st century. It was on a plot of 26 x 26 meters. There observations are made using psychometric booths, wind sensors and "smart instruments". The station makes numerous observations: sea coastal, radiometric, actinometric and background environmental pollution is also monitored. The results are transferred to the hydrometeorological center and the hydrometeorological office. The staff employs 8 people.

In 2009, within the framework of the project to modernize the meteorological network, a modern automated meteorological complex (AMK) was installed at the station, which allowed to remotely measure the temperature of air and soil surfaces, relative humidity, atmospheric pressure, quantity and intensity of precipitation.

As of 2015, specialists in the weather station in Taganrog study the sea regime in the coastal zone and are busy with monitoring of air pollutions. Remote sensing is used for research. The information received from MG-C Taganrog station is used in making forecasts for the territory of all Rostov region. In 2015, the institution celebrated 200 years from the beginning of the work.

== Employees ==
For many years such employees as A.P. Gramm (the station-master in 1963 — 1979), E.P. Mitrofanova (1944 — 1974), as L.A. Glushko worked at the sea hydrometeorological station Taganrog (1958 — 1988). During the period from the 1980th to the 2010s at the station worked competent and skilled experts — V.V. Klimova, O.L. Shchupletsova, M.G. Khachaturian . Now they are on deserved rest. The round-the-clock watch is kept by technicians-meteorologists E.L. Bondarenko, T.A. Kuznetsova, L.A. Lazurenko, L.A. Silayeva. As observers K.N. Khachaturian and T.A. Kravchenko-Golitsina work at the posts which are a part of the station. Director of the station is A.A. Davidenko.
