= National Weather Service Lincoln, Illinois =

Forecast office in central Illinois

Lincoln, Illinois Weather Forecast Office
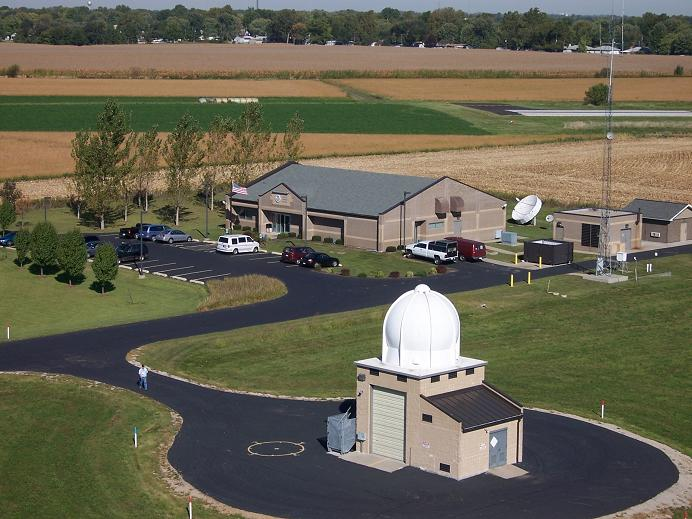
- The Lincoln, Illinois National Weather Service office.

Agency overview
- Preceding agencies: National Weather Service Peoria, Illinois; National Weather Service Springfield, Illinois
- Jurisdiction: Federal Government of the United States
- Headquarters: 1362 State Route 10, Lincoln, IL 62656; 40°9′6.2″N 89°20′18.2″W
- Employees: 22
- Agency executives: Ryan Knutsvig, Meteorologist in Charge; Ed Shimon, Warning Coordination Meteorologist
- Parent agency: National Weather Service

National Weather Service Lincoln, Illinois also known as National Weather Service Central Illinois is a weather forecast office responsible for monitoring weather conditions for 35 counties in Central and Southeastern Illinois. The Central Illinois office initially consisted of two forecast offices in Peoria and Springfield until the current location in Lincoln became the sole local forecast office in 1995. Federal meteorology offices and stations in the region date back to the 19th century when the Army Signal Service began taking weather observations using weather equipment at the Springer Building in Springfield. Since that time the presence of the National Weather Service greatly increased with the installation of new weather radars, stations and forecast offices. The current office in Lincoln maintains a WSR-88D (NEXRAD) radar system, and Advanced Weather Interactive Processing System (AWIPS) that greatly improve forecasting in the region. Lincoln is in charge of weather forecasts, warnings and local statements as well as aviation weather.

== History ==
=== Early history (1879–1930) ===
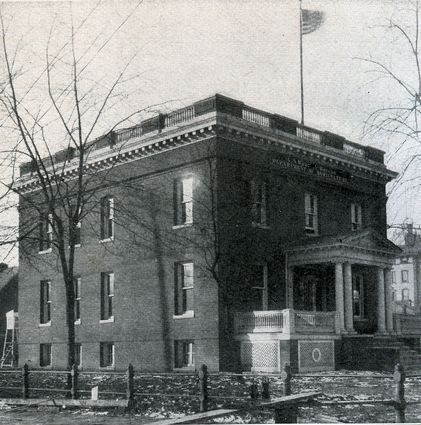
The U.S. Weather Bureau Office at 7th and Monroe in Springfield.

On July 1, 1879, the Army Signal Service began taking weather observations using weather equipment at the Springer Building in Springfield becoming the first federal weather station in the region. Eleven years later the U.S. Weather Bureau was founded and the equipment in Springfield was transferred from the Signal Service to the Weather Bureau. In 1898 Springfield became the site of a new weather station that used kites to measure data in the atmosphere using tethered instruments. In 1905 Peoria became the site of a new U.S. Weather Bureau, constructed at the cost of $7,969 the station measured temperatures, wind speeds, precipitation, snowfall, and barometric pressure. A year later at the Peoria Station a telegraph was installed to help better transmit weather data and observations. In Springfield the Weather Bureau was officially moved from its original location to a new building at 7th and Monroe. In 1928 the Springfield Weather Bureau moved temporarily to the Abe Lincoln Hotel and the old office was subsequently destroyed for construction of a new federal courthouse. Finally in 1930 the Springfield office was moved to its new location at the Springfield federal building.

=== Aviation Weather Stations (1931–1954) ===
In 1931 the Peoria Weather Bureau began 24-hour operations, and in the following years the office began direct radio broadcasts, through local radio station WMBD. As the aviation industry grew a Weather Bureau Airport Station (WBAS) was opened at the Peoria Municipal Airport, initial observations included temperature, wind and rain readings. Only a couple of months later another WBAS station was opened at a small airport in Springfield. In 1943 weather bureau operations at the original Peoria office merged with the airport station and in 1944 the original station closed permanently. In 1947 the airport weather station in Springfield was moved to the new Lincoln Capital Airport. In 1954 the Springfield Weather Bureau was closed and the airport station picked up the responsibilities of the old office.

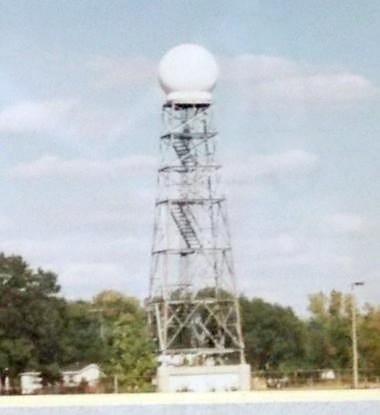
The Springfield WSR-74C radar, installed in 1974.

=== Introduction of Radars (1955–1992) ===
In 1955 parts of Central and Western Illinois became covered by the new weather radar WSR-1 at Lambert Field in Saint Louis. Radar coverage continued to improve after a new WSR-57 radar was installed in Saint Louis. In 1965 the weather bureau becomes part of the Environmental Science Services Administration (ESSA) and only a few years later it became the National Oceanic and Atmospheric Administration (NOAA) and the Weather Bureau became the National Weather Service (NWS). The Peoria and Springfield offices become known as "Weather Service Offices" under the new agency. In 1974 another radar (WSR-74S) was installed in Marseilles greatly improving the radar coverage in Central Illinois. A new radar, WSR-74C, was installed in Moline and helped the Peoria NWS issue severe weather warnings for the region. In 1980 the Springfield office received a WSR-74C radar system to use for local warning operations. In 1992 Automated Surface Observing Systems (ASOS) were installed at both the Peoria and Springfield airports.

=== National Weather Service Lincoln (1993–) ===
In 1993 construction began on a new NWS Weather Forecast Office at the Logan County Airport in Lincoln. The new office would be part of a modernization plan that relocate all operation to Lincoln and close the Peoria and Springfield offices. In 1994 the new Lincoln office was officially accepted by the federal government but did not have any operational responsibilities to begin with. The following year the upper air equipment from the National Weather Service Paducah was moved to the new Lincoln location, the only function the new office had at the time was to take observations using this equipment. In the spring of 1995 construction began on a new WSR-88D radar system in Lincoln. The first five meteorologists reported to the Lincoln location, but forecasting responsibilities remained at the Peoria and Springfield offices. By September 1995 the Lincoln office began full-time operations and picked up the counties from the Peoria and Springfield offices as well as a few from the Saint Louis and Evansville offices. On October 1, 1995, the National Weather Service offices in Peoria and Springfield were officially closed after serving Central Illinois since the early 20th century.

In 1996 the WSR-88D radar was completed and joins a network of other "NEXRAD" radars throughout the country, while the WSR-74C in Springfield was officially decommissioned. In 1998 an Advanced Weather Interactive Processing System (AWIPS) is installed at the office and helps forecasters make more accurate weather forecasts in the region. By the early 21st century the weather radio network in the region was greatly expanding and Lincoln could transmit warnings and general forecasts via such stations.

== Operations ==
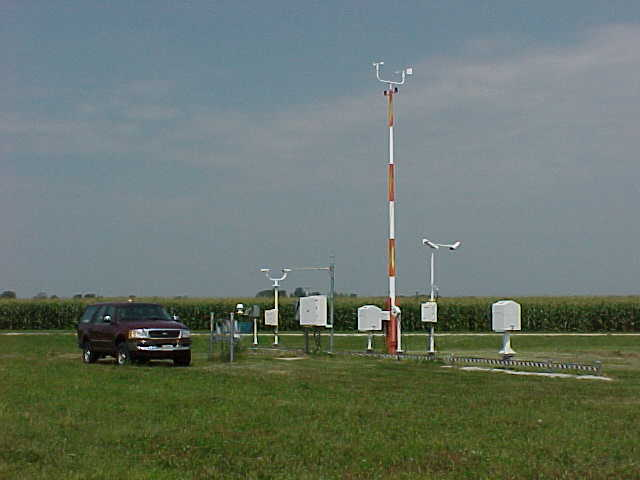
The Automated Surface Observing System (ASOS) at Peoria.

Lincoln is equipped with a WSR-88D (NEXRAD) radar, one of 159 high-resolution Doppler weather radars operated by the National Weather Service. The Lincoln office is also equipped with an Advanced Weather Interactive Processing System (AWIPS) that greatly increases monitoring capabilities of weather, satellite, and computer model data by forecasters. In addition the Lincoln office is also in charge of Automated Surface Observing Systems (ASOS) at General Wayne A. Downing Peoria International Airport and Abraham Lincoln Capital Airport. NWS Lincoln employs both short and long term weather forecasters who each have vital duties. The short term forecaster issues the Hazardous Weather Outlook, river forecast products and monitors thunderstorm activity as it develops. The long term forecaster plans weather forecasts up until seven days into the future, coordinates with other long term forecasters in neighboring regions and issues advisories for Winter weather and dense fog. There are also meteorologists assigned to data acquisition responsibilities, staff in this position are responsible for monitoring weather balloons, river stage observations, operation of the NOAA weather radio system and operations of the Cooperative Observer network. During times of Severe Weather NWS Lincoln divides its covered area into various geographic districts with different forecasters handling the severe weather operation of his or her own sector. Depending on the severity of the outbreak NWS Lincoln employs 2 to 6 meteorologists to issue any warnings. Volunteer HAM radio operators are also present during most severe weather outbreaks, coordinating information between weather spotters and forecasters.

=== Area of Responsibility ===
The National Weather Service Central Illinois is in charge of weather forecasts, warnings and local statements for 35 counties in Central and Southeastern Illinois: Cass, Champaign, Christian, Clark, Clay, Coles, Crawford, Cumberland, De Witt, Douglas, Edgar, Effingham, Fulton, Jasper, Knox, Lawrence, Logan, McLean, Macon, Marshall, Mason, Menard, Morgan, Moultrie, Peoria, Piatt, Richland, Sangamon, Schuyler, Scott, Shelby, Stark, Tazewell, Vermilion, and Woodford. In addition the office is in charge of aviation forecasts for five regional airports, Peoria, Springfield, Decatur, Champaign and Bloomington/Normal.

== Significant events ==
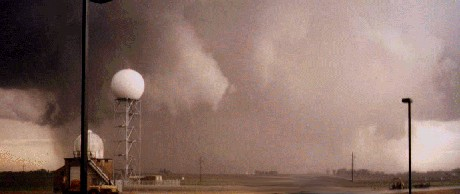
A tornado passed within two miles of NWS Lincoln on May 9, 1995.

In June 1957 Hurricane Audrey's extratropical remnants caused a major rain, and flooding event across much of Central Illinois. The Weather Bureau used many rain gauges across the region to measure the impacts of the storm. The National Weather Service in Lincoln has covered many significant weather events in its history. Early in the Lincoln office's history, an F3 tornado that was part of the May 1995 Tornado Outbreak Sequence passed within two miles of the new office. During the North American blizzard of 1999 several Lincoln forecasters were forced to spend 1–2 consecutive days at the office when their replacements could not get to them. Two violent tornadoes have occurred during the office's period of operation, the Roanoke, Illinois F4 tornado of July 13, 2004, and the Washington, IL EF4 during the tornado outbreak of November 17, 2013.

== NOAA Weather Radio ==
National Weather Service Lincoln, Illinois forecast office provides programming for nine NOAA Weather Radio stations in Illinois.

City of license	Call sign	Frequency (MHz)	Power	Counties served (in Illinois unless otherwise noted)
Bloomington	KZZ65	162.525 MHz	300 watts	De Witt, McLean, Tazewell, Woodford
Champaign	WXJ76	162.550 MHz	1,000 watts	Champaign, Coles, De Witt, Douglas, Edgar, Ford, Moultrie, Piatt, Vermilion
Galesburg	KZZ66	162.400 MHz	300 watts	Henry, Knox, Mercer, Warren
Jacksonville	WXM90	162.525 MHz	300 watts	Brown, Calhoun, Cass, Greene, Morgan, Pike, Scott
Newton	KXI48	162.450 MHz	1,000 watts	Clark, Clay, Crawford, Cumberland, Edwards, Effingham, Jasper, Lawrence, Richland, Wayne
Paris	KXI47	162.525 MHz	300 watts	Clark, Coles, Douglas, Edgar, Vigo County, Indiana
Peoria	WXJ71	162.475 MHz	1,000 watts	Fulton, Knox, Marshall, Mason, Peoria, Putnam, Stark, Tazewell, Woodford
Shelbyville	KXI46	162.500 MHz	300 watts	Christian, Effingham, Fayette, Moultrie, Shelby
Springfield	WXJ75	162.400 MHz	1,000 watts	Cass, Christian, De Witt, Logan, Macon, Macoupin, Mason, Menard, Montgomery, Morgan, Sangamon
