= Community Collaborative Rain, Hail and Snow Network =

International citizen science project

The CoCoRaHS logo

The Community Collaborative Rain, Hail and Snow Network, or CoCoRaHS, is a network of volunteer weather observers in the United States, Canada, and the Bahamas that take daily readings of precipitation and report them to a central data store over the Internet. The program is an example of citizen science.

== History ==
In 1997, the network was started in Larimer County, Colorado, after a flash flood in Spring Creek killed five people and damaged structures in the city of Fort Collins, Colorado, including hundreds of millions of US dollars in damage to the Colorado State University campus.

The severity of the flood and its widespread spatial variability surprised meteorologists, and Nolan Doesken, a former assistant state climatologist for the state of Colorado, asked for precipitation measurements from private citizens in the area. About 300 responded to his emergency request for data. Said Doesken later:

"The results of the data showed that more than 14 in. (36 cm) of rain fell over southwest Fort Collins, the area where the flood waters originated, while less than 2 in. (5 cm) of rain fell only 3–4 mi (5–6 km) east. The enthusiastic interest shown by volunteers and the great value of the data verified the need for such a service, and CoCoRaHS was born."

== Expansion to other U.S. States/territories and other countries ==
The program was originally confined to Colorado (the first "Co" in "CoCoRaHS" stood for "Colorado" instead of "Community"), but began expanding to other states, first expanding to Wyoming in 2003, with the last expansion into Nebraska in March 2013.

Order of U.S. States Joining the CoCoRaHS Network
Order of addition to network	State/District (in descending order from first included to last included)	Time when CoCoRaHS expanded to specified state/district
1	Colorado	1998
2	Wyoming	2003
3	Kansas	2004
4	New Mexico	March 2005
5	Texas	April 2005
6	Maryland	October 2005
7	Virginia	October 2005
8	District of Columbia	October 2005
9	Pennsylvania	October 2005
10	Indiana	December 2005
11	Missouri	March 2006
12	Oklahoma	June 2006
13	Montana	December 2006
14	Illinois	December 2006
15	Alaska	December 2006
16	Nevada	March 2007
17	Wisconsin	March 2007
18	Tennessee	April 2007
19	South Dakota	June 2007
20	Iowa	August 2007
21	North Carolina	September 2007
22	New York	September 2007
23	Florida	October 2007
24	Alabama	November 2007
25	Kentucky	November 2007
26	Oregon	Late 2007, Early 2008
27	Louisiana	January 2008
28	New Jersey	February 2008
29	South Carolina	March 2008
30	Rhode Island	April 2008
31	Georgia	May 2008
32	Washington	June 2008
33	Utah	July 2008
34	Michigan	July 2008
35	Mississippi	August 2008
36	California	October 2008
37	North Dakota	November 2008
38	Idaho	January 2009
39	Ohio	February 2009
40	Massachusetts	March 2009
41	Vermont	April 2009
42	Arkansas	April 2009
43	West Virginia	May 2009
44	Hawaii	June 2009
45	Connecticut	July 2009
46	New Hampshire	July 2009
47	Maine	August 2009
48	Arizona	September 2009
49	Delaware	September 2009
50	Minnesota	December 2009
51	Nebraska	March 2013

Order of countries and territories joining the CoCoRaHS Network
Order of addition to network	Country/Territory (in descending order from first included to last included)	Time of which CoCoRaHS expanded to specified country/territory
1	Canada	December 2012
2	Puerto Rico	June 2013
3	U.S. Virgin Islands	February 2015
4	The Bahamas	June 2016
5	Guam	October 2022

== Users ==
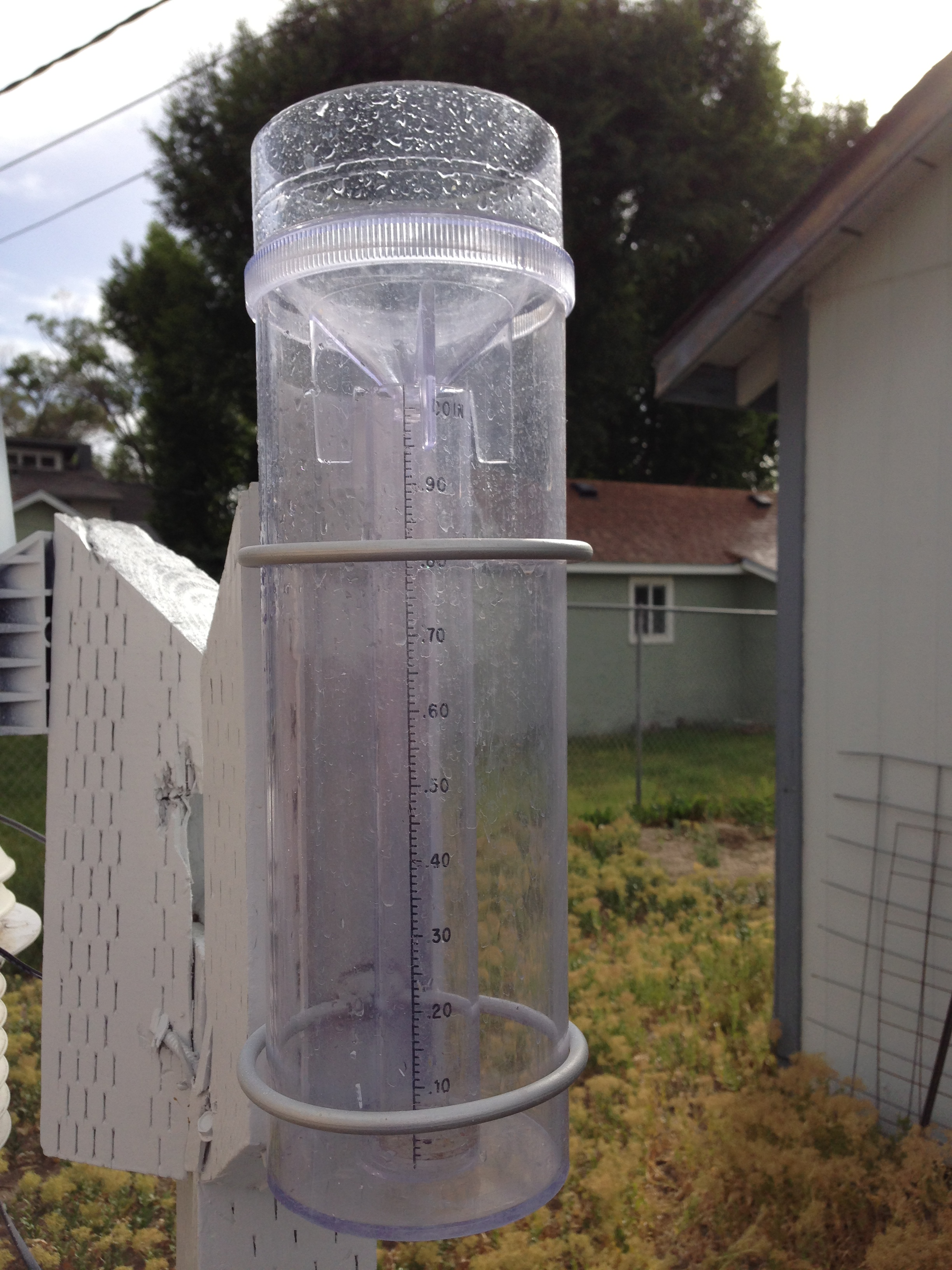
A 4-inch (10 cm) plastic rain gauge, typical of those used by the CoCoRaHS program. Measurements may be taken and reported either in inches or in millimeters.

CoCoRaHS is used by a wide variety of organizations and individuals. The National Weather Service (NWS), other meteorologists, hydrologists, emergency managers, city utilities (water supply, water conservation, storm water), transportation departments, insurance adjusters, the USDA, engineers, mosquito control, ranchers and farmers, outdoor and recreation interests, teachers, students, and neighbors in the community are examples of people who use CoCoRaHS data.

=== Other programs ===
In or around 2000, the National Weather Service Lincoln, Illinois independently began a similar program, the Significant Weather Observing Program (SWOP). CoCoRaHS data supplements the more rigorous data from the national program with increased spatial and temporal resolution. Real-time data is also provided by the Citizen Weather Observer Program (CWOP), whose users operate weather stations that automatically report over the Internet, and which supplements the more rigorous data reported by formal surface weather observation stations. The earliest and thus critically important for its long-term historical record from respective locations is the Cooperative Observer program of manually recorded daily summaries.

== Sponsors ==
The National Oceanic and Atmospheric Administration (NOAA) and the National Science Foundation (NSF) are major sponsors of CoCoRaHS and the Bureau of Land Management (BLM) is also a partner. Other organizations have contributed either financially or with supplies and equipment. Many other organizations and individuals have also pitched in time and resources to help keep the network up and running.

== Forms ==
Gregory Syroney with the Scioto County Storm Chaser Center, in Portsmouth, Ohio created the Significant Weather Report Form PDF File for CoCoRaHS Headquarters in Fort Collins.

== Status ==
As of 2015, all fifty states, the District of Columbia, and the Commonwealth of Puerto Rico participate in CoCoRaHS.

=== Canada ===
In December 2011, the CoCoRaHS Canada network began in Manitoba following a massive flood in that province.

As of 2014, the network had expanded to the Canadian provinces of Alberta, British Columbia, Manitoba, New Brunswick, Newfoundland and Labrador, Nova Scotia, Ontario, Prince Edward Island, Quebec, and Saskatchewan, with over 20,000 participants as of March 2015.

== See also ==
- Skywarn
- Safecast (organization)

== Bibliography ==
- This article incorporates text available under the CC BY 3.0 license.
