= Skywarn =

Program of the National Weather Service in the US

- Formation: 1965
- Type: Government organization
- Purpose: Severe weather spotting
- Headquarters: Silver Spring, Maryland
- Region served: United States
- Members: Volunteer
- Official language: English
- Parent organization: National Weather Service
- Staff: >300,000
- Website: NWS Skywarn

Skywarn (sometimes stylized as SKYWARN) is a program of the National Weather Service (NWS). Its mission is to collect reports of localized severe weather in the United States. These reports are used to aid forecasters in issuing and verifying severe weather watches and warnings and to improve the forecasting and warning processes and the tools used to collect meteorological data. Reports are also used by local emergency managers and public safety organizations.

Skywarn consists of a network of trained severe storm spotters who observe weather conditions and make reports of severe weather to their local NWS offices. These spotters are regularly trained by personnel from the local NWS offices. In many areas, classes are conducted each spring in advance of the coming severe weather season. Many Skywarn spotters use methods to communicate with one another during severe storm events. A notable example of this is through the use of amateur radio nets, which is still an important method since severe weather can significantly disrupt local telecommunications systems. The program began in 1965, and counts over 300,000 active trained spotters.

== Storm spotting ==
Where severe storms are possible, storm spotting groups such as Skywarn in the United States coordinate amateur radio operators and localized spotters to keep track of severe thunderstorms and tornadoes. Reports from spotters and chasers are given to the National Weather Service so that they have ground truth information to warn the general public. Spotting provides ground information and localized conditions that the National Weather Service might not know the extent or might not otherwise be aware of. They typically report events, such as structures struck by lightning, rotating wall clouds, funnel clouds—or conditions that exceed specific thresholds, such as extremely strong winds, significant hail or very heavy rainfall. The exact reporting thresholds can vary by region and may even dynamically change during a severe weather event. Spotters also give reports during winter storms, floods, hurricanes, and wildfires. Some spotters also play a role in damage assessment after a disaster, by reporting or documenting areas of damage, and by helping to formulate preliminary damage estimates (such as for tornadoes).

Other countries have similar programs, such as the Canadian spotting program Canwarn, the SkyWarnUK and the Tornado and Storm Research Organisation (TORRO) programs in the United Kingdom, and Skywarn Europe for several European countries.

== Training ==
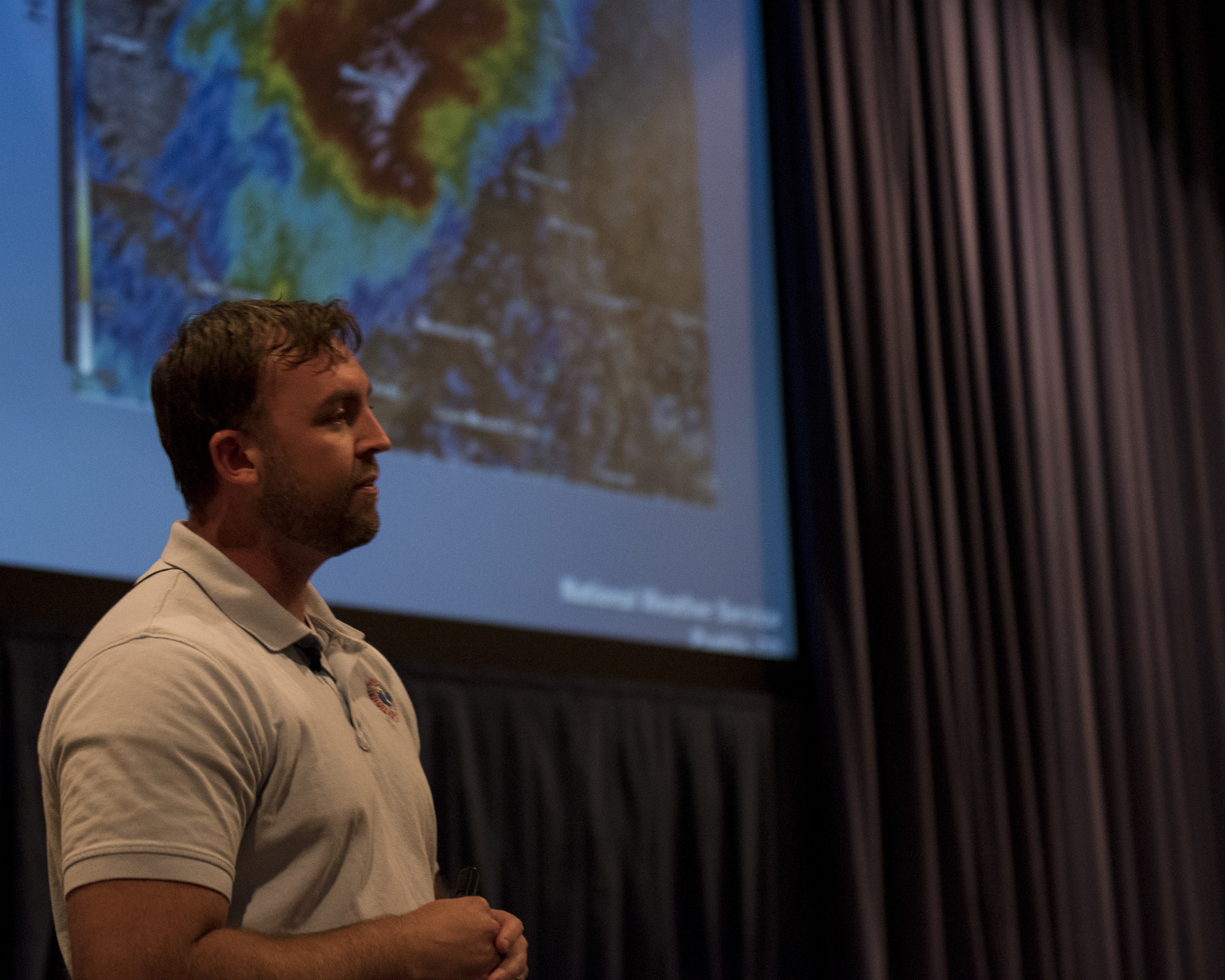
A Skywarn Training presentation at Peterson Air Force Base

The NWS sponsors Skywarn training sessions in the US. These sessions usually occupy two hours, and focus on hazard identification and communication along with spotter strategies and safety. NWS recommends attendance at refresher courses every two years.

=== Methods of participation ===
Skywarn has long been associated with ham radio. Many NWS offices maintain an amateur radio station that is manned by amateur radio operators during times of severe weather. This allows licensed amateur radio spotters to transmit their severe weather reports directly to the NWS and receive up-to-date severe weather updates even if regular communications are disrupted or overloaded by the weather emergency. It does, however, require 1) the cooperation of the local Weather Forecast Office (WFO), and 2) that the station be manned continuously during severe weather events. Ham radio nets can operate to gather and relay information via landline telephone or Internet. Automatic weather station observations and spotter positions can be provided by the Automatic Packet Reporting System (APRS), which can also accommodate text message. Participation in the Skywarn program does not require an amateur radio license. More than half of all Skywarn spotters are not licensed amateur radio operators.

Many Skywarn spotters are members of emergency services such as volunteer fire departments, rescue squads, ambulance units, or police or sheriff's departments.

The NWS encourages anyone with an interest in public service and access to some method of communication, such as amateur radio, telephone, the Internet, etc. to join the Skywarn program. Volunteers include police and fire personnel, dispatchers, EMS workers, public utility workers, truck drivers, mariners, aircraft pilots, and other concerned private citizens. Individuals affiliated with hospitals, schools, churches, nursing homes or who have a responsibility for protecting others are also strongly encouraged to become spotters.

Those without radio communication capability can still make their reports via cell phone, landline telephone, or the Internet.

== See also ==
- Amateur Radio Emergency Service (ARES)
- Citizen Weather Observer Program (CWOP)
- Community Collaborative Rain, Hail and Snow Network (CoCoRaHS)
- Cooperative Observer Program (COOP)
- Radio Amateur Civil Emergency Service (RACES)
- Radio Emergency Associated Communication Teams (REACT)
- Significant Weather Observing Program (SWOP)
- Safecast (organization)
