= MesoWest =

Weather data delivery system

MesoWest is a cooperative project to observe and archive mesoscale weather observations across the United States. Their observations include, but are not limited to, temperature, humidity, wind speed, wind direction, and precipitation. Their data is also known to be central for climate records, such as for monitoring microclimates.

Data is collected from a variety of organizations. Some stations participate in voluntary weather observing networks such as the Citizen Weather Observer Program (CWOP). Others are part of formal mesonets that are managed by private firms, federal/state/local agencies, and/or universities. This data is utilized for a multitude of uses. Over 20,000 weather stations report to the MesoWest database.

MesoWest began as the Utah Mesonet, but was renamed as its scope expanded beyond the state. Parties involved in this project include researchers at the University of Utah, forecasters at the Salt Lake City National Weather Service Forecast Office (NWSFO), the National Weather Service Western Region Headquarters, universities, and commercial firms. Support for this project is being provided by the National Weather Service (NWS).

== Access to weather and climate information ==
Delivery methods have been designed to satisfy varying needs for weather information visualization. The following is a brief overview of the purpose for each of MesoWest’s available delivery methods:

Current Weather Summary
Quick and flexible access to current weather conditions in a tabular format. Users are able to view weather conditions locally or at larger scales.
Weather Maps
Map-based interfaces allow easy access to MesoWest data plotted on surface analyses and/or specialized topographic depictions.
LDM (Local Data Manager) Delivery
Data from MesoWest are disseminated to NWS Forecast Offices via dedicated communication channels for input into AWIPS. Forecasters are able to superimpose mesonet observations onto satellite, radar, and other products. MesoWest data is also available to universities and government agencies that rely upon the LDM data distribution system.
Website downloads
MesoWest data is available for download via the web.

=== Usage ===
MesoWest is used operationally by the National Weather Service to monitor weather conditions around the country in order to protect lives and property. MesoWest is also used extensively by researchers to understand severe weather events such as winter snow storms, damaging winds, and convective weather events. MesoWest surface observations are integrated into high spatial and temporal resolution grid analyses across the United States that is ingested into numerical weather prediction models. The University of Oklahoma (OU) Advanced Regional Prediction System Data Analysis System (ADAS) has been configured to run over regions of complex terrain, including 3-dimensional and surface-based analyses. The Utah ADAS relies on MesoWest observations as an important source of local data, modifying initial background fields provided by numerical model analyses.

MesoWest data is also available to the educational community for use in the classroom. Students in grades K-12 can observe weather conditions near their school or around the region.

=== Restrictions ===
The data provided to MesoWest arises from cooperative arrangements with many different educational institutions, public agencies, and commercial firms. This data is intended to be used by governmental agencies to protect lives and property, the public for general information, and educational institutions for instructional and research purposes. Any other uses of the data from one or more stations must receive written approval from the agencies that installed the weather sensors.
