= HWO =

HWO may refer to:

- Habitable Worlds Observatory
- Hazardous weather outlook
- Hwana language, spoken in Nigeria
- Hydraulic workover
- North Perry Airport, in Florida, United States
- Home walkover in rugby
