= SWOP =

SWOP may refer to:

- Specifications for Web Offset Publications
- Sex Workers Outreach Project USA
- Significant Weather Observing Program
