= Logan County Airport (Illinois) =

Public use airport in Lincoln, Illinois

- IATA: none; ICAO: KAAA; FAA LID: AAA

Summary
- Airport type: Public
- Owner: Logan County Board
- Serves: Lincoln, Illinois
- Location: Logan County, Illinois
- Time zone: UTC−06:00 (-6)
  - Summer (DST): UTC−05:00 (-5)
- Elevation AMSL: 597 ft / 182 m
- Coordinates: 40°09′31″N 089°20′06″W

Map
- Location of airport in Illinois AAA (the United States)

Runways
Direction	Length		Surface
Direction	ft	m	Surface
3/21	3,999	1,219	Asphalt
14/32	3,003	915	Turf

Statistics (2019)
- Aircraft operations: 7,000
- Based aircraft: 13
- Source: Federal Aviation Administration

Logan County Airport (ICAO: KAAA, FAA LID: AAA) is a public use airport located 2.2 nautical miles (4 km) northeast of the central business district of Lincoln, a city in Logan County, Illinois, United States. It is owned by the Logan County Board. The airport is also the site of the National Weather Service Central Illinois (Central Illinois Forecast Office).

Although most U.S. airports use the same three-letter location identifier for the FAA and IATA, this airport is assigned AAA by the FAA but has no designation from the IATA (which assigned AAA to Anaa Airport in Anaa, French Polynesia).

The airport is home to the Heritage in Flight Museum, which focuses on preserving military displays. The airport is located in an authentic WWII barracks relocated from Camp Ellis.

== Facilities and aircraft ==
Logan County Airport covers an area of 218 acres (88 ha) at an elevation of 597 feet (182 m) above mean sea level. It has two runways: 3/21 with an asphalt pavement measuring 3,999 x 75 ft (1,219 x 23 m) and 14/32 with a turf surface measuring 3,003 x 135 ft (915 x 41 m).

The airport has an FBO offering food and restrooms.

For the 12-month period ending August 31, 2019, the airport had 7,000 aircraft operations, an average of 19 per day: 80% general aviation, 19% air taxi and 1% military. At that time there were 13 aircraft based at this airport: 13 single-engine and 1 multi-engine airplane.

== Accidents and incidents ==
- On July 11, 2018, a single-engine Cessna 182 Skylane made an emergency landing while attempting to land at the Logan County Airport. The aircraft landed on a road short of the airport.
- On March 29, 2023, a Piper PA-32 Cherokee Six was substantially damaged when it was involved in an accident at the Logan County Airport. After a training flight, the aircraft experienced a total loss of engine power while on approach to Lincoln County Airport, and the flight instructor onboard maneuvered the airplane for a forced landing. The accident is under investigation.

== See also ==
- List of airports in Illinois
- Lincoln station
