= Taganrog lighthouse =

Taganrog Lighthouse
- Таганрогский маяк (Russian)
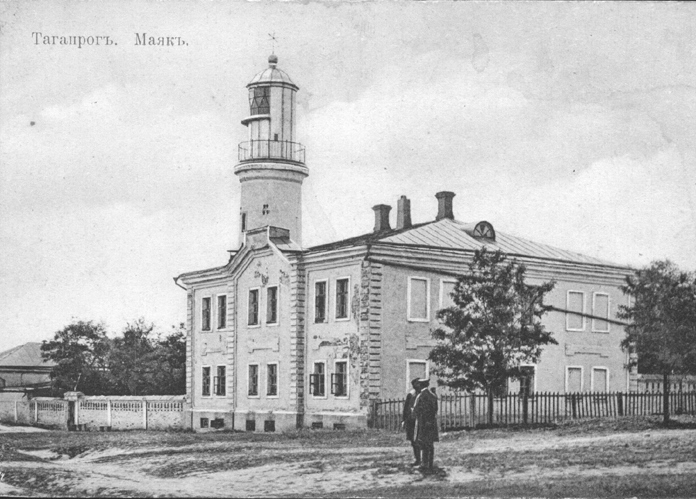

- Location within Russia
- Location: Taganrog, Rostov oblast Russia

History
- Built: 1770

Site notes
- Architect: N.A. Arkas

Taganrog Lighthouse (Russian: Таганрогский маяк) is a lost lighthouse in Taganrog, Rostov region located near the monument to Peter the Great and destroyed in 1970 because it was in a critical condition.

== History ==
The first lighthouse in Taganrog was built in 1770. Then, for unknown reasons he ceased to exist. In 1877 there were two resolutions dated on July 5 and on October 24 according to which sea department could build a lighthouse on a territory with a total area of 625 square fathom. Also, it was placed the area of 750 square fathoms at the disposal of the department for breaking up the garden around the lighthouse. At the same time only one condition was laid down: people will have free access to the territory of the garden. The stone lighthouse was built in 1878. The work was carried out under the guidance of N.A Arkas. On the building of the lighthouse there was a sign that read: "It was built in 1878 at the chief commander of the Black Sea Fleet and ports general aide-de-camp Admiral Nikolay Andreevich Arkas".

On 9 March 1909 kerosene lighting on the lighthouse was replaced with electric. Power production happened thanks to work of substation which was established in the building in the territory of a garden. The lighthouse stopped the work in the autumn of 1941 in connection with the occupation of the city and resumed in August 1943 after its liberation.

In August 1970, the lighthouse was pulled down because of critical condition. In its place appeared metal section mast with fire. From the architectural ensemble of the lighthouse were preserved only the buildings that were in the neighborhood - the housing for naval officers, and the guardhouse at the gate.

== Description ==
In the garden which was based near the lighthouse, there were several buildings. To the left of it was built the one-story house on a low socle. The facade of the house was decorated with semicircular windows. Rectangular niches were located above them. To the right of the lighthouse was a building belonging to officers of sea department. It had rectangular windows, a semi-basement was equipped. On the territory of the garden was weather station.

The height of the lighthouse was 22 meters with the thickness of the walls from below 1 meter. The lighthouse took the cylinder form, being gradually narrowed from below up. On the stone walls of the building were made rectangular windows. Two observation platforms, which were located at the very top of the object, were designed in the form of stone ledges. In order to protect them were used metal lattices. The top of the lighthouse was glazed. There was a lantern which was used for giving signals to vessels in the evening night time. At bad weather conditions he helped vessels to find a way to the mooring, more dimensional objects — to avoid a shallow. On top of the lighthouse was installed a dome with a sphere and weather vane. Light beams of the lighthouse operated at a distance of 35 -40 kilometers. The absolute mark of the lantern on the lighthouse was 70 meters above sea level.
