= Todd Gross =

American meteorologist

Todd Gross is a meteorologist. He began his TV career in Rochester (WROC), Albany (WNYT), and at the short-lived Satellite News Channel in 1982. Known best for his years as a Boston meteorologist, Gross started at WNEV-TV (the present day WHDH-TV) in 1984 as a weekend meteorologist and science reporter. In that same year, he broadened and formalized the use of weather spotters on the air and introduced the "sunburn index" (a predecessor of the UV index) to the Boston area. In 1988, Gross was promoted to meteorologist for WNEV-TV's morning and weekday noon newscasts.

In August 2002, Gross was promoted to chief meteorologist at WHDH, replacing veteran Harvey Leonard who left channel 7 for WCVB-TV (channel 5). He remained in that role until December 2005.

Gross played a role in the forecasting of the 1991 Perfect Storm. He was played by actor Christopher McDonald in the 2000 film of the same name.

More recently, Gross worked as a meteorologist in Springfield, Ma. (2006–2007), and Salt Lake City (2007-2010). He also worked in an "on call" capacity at CNBC to cover events like Hurricane Irene, and Superstorm Sandy that caused devastating winds and floods.

Beginning in March 2024 Gross began doing weather and astronomy reports on Tik Tok where he now has over 500,000 followers as of July, 2026.
