= Mesonet =

Network of weather and environment monitoring stations

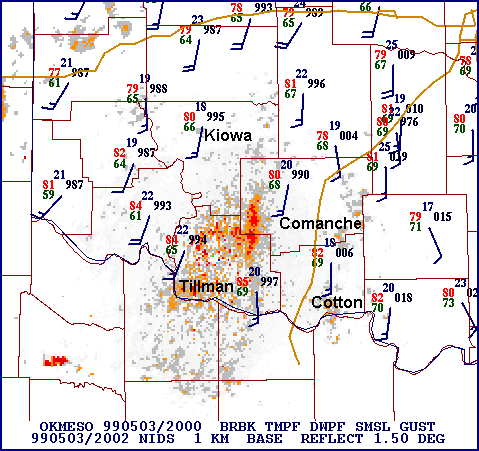
A weather map consisting of a station model plot of Oklahoma Mesonet data overlaid with WSR-88D weather radar data depicting possible horizontal convective rolls as a potential contributing factor in the incipient 3 May 1999 tornado outbreak A mobile mesonet also documented tornadic supercells and their immediate environments during this event.

In meteorology and climatology, a mesonet, portmanteau of mesoscale network, is a network of automated weather and environmental monitoring stations, designed to observe mesoscale meteorological phenomena and microclimates.

Dry lines, squall lines, and sea breezes are examples of phenomena observed by mesonets. Due to the space and time scales associated with mesoscale phenomena and microclimates, weather stations comprising a mesonet are spaced closer together and report more frequently than synoptic scale observing networks, such as the WMO Global Observing System (GOS) and US ASOS. The term mesonet refers to the collective group of these weather stations, which are usually owned and operated by a common entity. Mesonets generally record in situ surface weather observations but some involve other observation platforms, particularly vertical profiles of the planetary boundary layer (PBL). Other environmental parameters may include insolation and various variables of interest to particular users, such as soil temperature or road conditions (the latter notable in Road Weather Information System (RWIS) networks).

The distinguishing features that classify a network of weather stations as a mesonet are station density and temporal resolution with sufficiently robust station quality. Depending upon the phenomena meant to be observed, mesonet stations use a spatial spacing of 1 to 40 kilometres (0.6 to 20 mi) and report conditions every 1 to 15 minutes. Micronets (see microscale and storm scale), such as in metropolitan areas such as Oklahoma City, St. Louis, and Birmingham UK, are denser in spatial and often also in temporal resolution.

== Purpose ==
Thunderstorms and other atmospheric convection, squall lines, drylines, sea and land breezes, mountain breeze and valley breezes, mountain waves, mesolows and mesohighs, wake lows, mesoscale convective vortices (MCVs), tropical cyclone and extratropical cyclone rainbands, macrobursts, gust fronts and outflow boundaries, heat bursts, urban heat islands (UHIs), and other mesoscale phenomena, as well as topographical features, can cause weather and climate conditions in a localized area to be significantly different from that dictated by the ambient large-scale conditions. As such, meteorologists must understand these phenomena in order to improve forecast skill. Observations are critical to understanding the processes by which these phenomena form, evolve, and dissipate.

The long-term observing networks (ASOS, AWOS, COOP), however, are too sparse and report too infrequently for mesoscale research and forecasting. ASOS and AWOS stations are typically spaced 50 to 100 kilometres (30 to 60 mi) apart and report only hourly at many sites (though over time the frequency of reporting has increased, down to 5–15 minutes in the 2020s at major sites). The Cooperative Observer Program (COOP) database consists of only daily reports recorded manually. That network, like the more recent CoCoRaHS, is large but both are limited in reporting frequency and robustness of equipment. "Mesoscale" weather phenomena occur on spatial scales of a few to hundreds of kilometers and temporal (time) scales of minutes to hours. Thus, an observing network with finer temporal and spatial scales is needed for mesoscale research. This need led to the development of the mesonet.

Mesonet data is directly used by humans for decision making, but also boosts the skill of numerical weather prediction (NWP) and is especially beneficial for short-range mesoscale models. Mesonets, along with remote sensing solutions (data assimilation of weather radar, weather satellites, wind profilers), allow for much greater temporal and spatial resolution in a forecast model. As the atmosphere is a chaotic nonlinear dynamical system (i.e. subject to the Butterfly effect), this increase in data increases understanding of initial conditions and boosts model performance. In addition to meteorology and climatology users, hydrologists, foresters, wildland firefighters, transportation departments, energy producers and distributors, other utility interests, and agricultural entities are prominent in their need for fine scale weather information. These organizations operate dozens of mesonets within the US and globally. Environmental, outdoor recreational, emergency management and public safety, military, and insurance interests also are heavy users of mesonet information.

In many cases, mesonet stations may, by necessity or sometimes by lack of awareness, be located in positions where accurate measurements may be compromised. For instance, this is especially true of citizen science and crowdsourced data systems, such as the stations built for WeatherBug's network, many of which are located on school buildings. The Citizen Weather Observer Program (CWOP) facilitated by the US National Weather Service (NWS) and other networks such as those collected by Weather Underground help fill gaps with resolutions sometimes meeting or exceeding that of mesonets, but many stations also exhibit biases due to improper siting, calibration, and maintenance. These consumer grade "personal weather stations" (PWS) are also less sensitive and rigorous than scientific grade stations. The potential bias that these stations may cause must be accounted for when ingesting the data into a model, lest the phenomenon of "garbage in, garbage out" occur.

== Operations ==
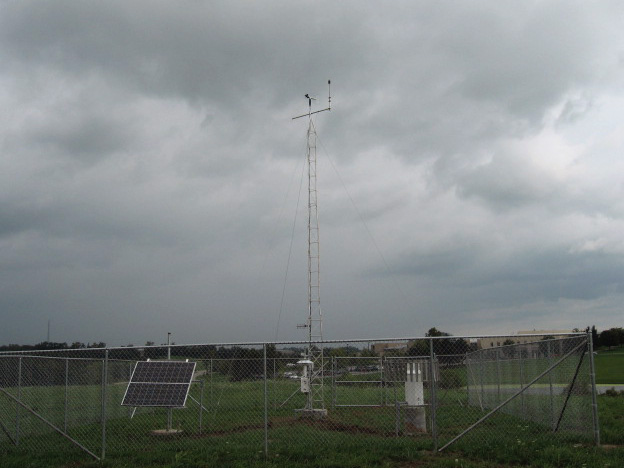
Kentucky Mesonet station WSHT near Maysville in Mason County

Mesonets were born out of the need to conduct mesoscale research. The nature of this research is such that mesonets, like the phenomena they were meant to observe, were (and sometimes still are) short-lived and may change rapidly. Long-term research projects and non-research groups, however, have been able to maintain a mesonet for many years. For example, the U.S. Army Dugway Proving Ground in Utah has maintained a mesonet for many decades. The research-based origin of mesonets led to the characteristic that mesonet stations may be modular and portable, able to be moved from one field program to another. Nonetheless, most large contemporary mesonets or nodes within consist of permanent stations comprising stationary networks. Some research projects, however, utilize mobile mesonets. Prominent examples include the VORTEX projects. The problems of implementing and maintaining robust fixed stations are exacerbated by lighter, compact mobile stations and are further worsened by various issues related when moving, such as vehicle slipstream effects, and particularly during rapid changes in the ambient environment associated with traversing severe weather.

Whether the mesonet is temporary or semi-permanent, each weather station is typically independent, drawing power from a battery and solar panels. An on-board computer records readings from several instruments measuring temperature, humidity, wind speed and direction, and atmospheric pressure, as well as soil temperature and moisture, and other environmental variables deemed important to the mission of the mesonet, solar irradiance being a common non-meteorological parameter. The computer periodically saves these data to memory, typically using data loggers, and transmits the observations to a base station via radio, telephone (wireless, such as cellular or landline), or satellite transmission. Advancements in computer technology and wireless communications in recent decades made possible the collection of mesonet data in real-time. Some stations or networks report using Wi-Fi and grid powered with backups for redundancy.

The availability of mesonet data in real-time can be extremely valuable to operational forecasters, and particularly for nowcasting, as they can monitor weather conditions from many points in their forecast area. In addition to operational work, and weather, climate, and environmental research, mesonet and micronet data are often important in forensic meteorology.

== History ==
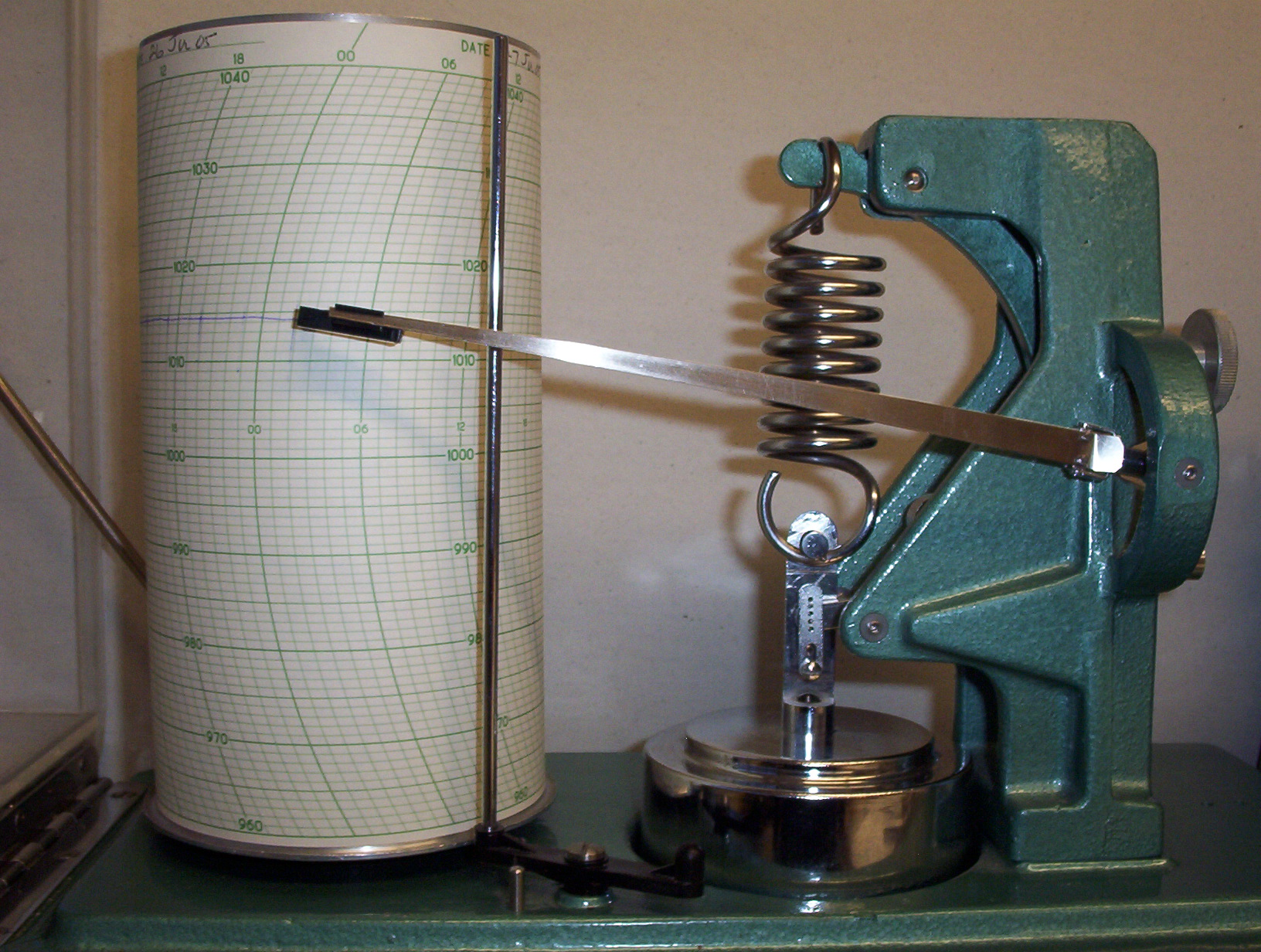
Three-day barograph of the type used by the Meteorological Service of Canada

Early mesonets operated differently from modern mesonets. Each constituent instrument of the weather station was purely mechanical and fairly independent of the other sensors. Data were recorded continuously by an inked stylus that pivoted about a point onto a rotating drum covered by a sheath of graphed paper called a trace chart, much like a traditional seismograph station. Data analysis could occur only after the trace charts from the various instruments were collected.

One of the earliest mesonets operated in the summer of 1946 and 1947 and was part of a field campaign called The Thunderstorm Project. As the name implies, the objective of this program was to better understand thunderstorm convection. The earliest mesonets were typically funded and operated by government agencies for specific campaigns. In time, universities and other quasi-public entities began implementing permanent mesonets for a wide variety of uses, such as agricultural or maritime interests. Consumer grade stations added to the professional grade synoptic and mesoscale networks by the 1990s and by the 2010s professional grade station networks operated by private companies and public-private consortia increased in prominence. Some of these privately implemented systems are permanent and at fixed locations, but many also service specific users and campaigns/events so may be installed for limited periods, and may also be mobile.

The first known mesonet was operated by Germany from 1939 to 1941. Early mesonets with project based purposes operated for limited periods of time from seasons to a few years. The first permanently operating mesonet began in the United States in the 1970s with more entering operation in the 1980s-1990s as numbers gradually increased preceding a steeper expansion by the 2000s. By the 2010s there was also an increase in mesonets on other continents. Some wealthy densely populated countries also deploy observation networks with the density of a mesonet, such as the AMeDAS in Japan. The US was an early adopter of mesonets, yet funding has long been scattered and meager. By the 2020s declining funding atop the earlier scarcity and uncertainty of funding was leading to understaffing and problems maintaining stations, the closure of some stations, and the viability of entire networks threatened.

Mesonets capable of being moved for fixed station deployments in field campaigns came into use in the US by the 1970s and fully mobile vehicle-mounted mesonets became fixtures of large field research projects during the field campaigns of Project VORTEX in 1994 and 1995, in which significant mobile mesonets were deployed. For tornado and other small scale and/or near surface phenomena, mobile radars affixed to surface vehicles and aircraft were developed, often to complement surface and near surface observations by mobile mesonets.

== Significant mesonets ==
The following table is an incomplete list of mesonets operating in the past and present:

Name of Network, Place	Years of operation	Spacing	No. of Stations (Year)	Objectives
Lindenberger Böennetz, Lindenberg, Tauche, Germany	1939–1941	3–20 km (1.9–12.4 mi)	19-25	research on convective hazards, including squall lines and wind gusts, to aviation
Maebashi, Japan	1940	8–13 km (5.0–8.1 mi)	20 (1940)	research on convective hazards to aviation, examined structure of thunderstorms
Muskingum basin, Ohio	1941	10 km (6.2 mi)	131 (1941)	rainfall and runoff research
The Thunderstorm Project, Florida	1946	1 mi (1.6 km)	50 (1946)	thunderstorm convection research
The Thunderstorm Project, Ohio	1947	2 mi (3.2 km)	58 (1947)	thunderstorm convection research
New Jersey	1960	10 km (6.2 mi)	23 (1960)	research on mesoscale pressure systems
Fort Huachuca, Arizona	1960	20 km (12 mi)	28 (1960)	Army operations (military meteorology) research
Fort Huachuca, Arizona	1961	3 km (1.9 mi)	17 (1961)	research on influence of orography
Dugway Proving Ground, Utah	1961–Present	9 mi (14 km)	26	air quality modeling and other desert area research
Flagstaff, Arizona	1961	8 km (5.0 mi)	43 (1961)	cumulonimbus convection research
National Severe Storms Project (NSSP), Southern Plains US	1961	20 km (12 mi)	36 (1961)	research on structure of severe storms
National Severe Storms Project (NSSP), Southern Plains US	1962	60 km (37 mi)	210 (1962)	research on squall lines and pressure jumps
NSSL mesonetwork and mesometeorological rawinsonde networks, Oklahoma	1961–1980s	<6-17 mi (<9–28 km) surface, 18-53 mi (30–85 km) upper (1966-1970)	30-61 surface, 8-11 upper (1966-1970)	primarily convection and dryline research in partnership with AF and Army, with focus in some years on aviation and particularly airport operations; annual field projects included varying number and spatial density of seasonal surface and upper air stations combined with radar and aircraft observations plus instrumented tower, leading to evolution of storm scale networks and automated networks (e.g. NSSL Surface Automated Mesonetwork); other research projects increasingly arose in 70s-80s
Enviro-Weather, Michigan (now also adjacent sections of Wisconsin)	1972–Present	Varies	81	agriculturally centered; archive, varies from 5-60 min observations
NCAR Portable Automated Mesonet I NCAR Portable Automated Mesonet II	1976–1982; 1982–1987		30 ≈200	research networks
Nebraska Mesonet, Nebraska	1981–Present	Varies	69 (2018)	originally agriculturally centered now multipurpose; archive, near real-time observations
South Dakota Mesonet, South Dakota	1983–Present	36 km (22 mi)	109	archive, real-time 5 min observations
FAA-Lincoln Laboratory Operational Weather Studies (FLOWS)	1984–1986+		30	aviation research network focused on low-level wind shear and microburst hazards with radar (TDWR) and other detection systems that became LLWAS
Kansas Mesonet, Kansas	1986–Present	Varies	72	archive, real-time observations
Arizona Meteorological Network (AZMET), Arizona	1986–Present	Varies	27	agriculturally centered; archive, real-time observations, 15 min - 1 hr
Washington Mesonet/AgWeatherNet, Washington	1988–Present	Varies	177	multi-network system (comprehensive monitoring, agricultural focused); archive, real-time observations, 5 and 15 min
Ohio Agricultural Research and Development Center (OARDC) Weather System, Ohio	1989–Present	Varies	17	agriculturally centered; archive, hourly observations
North Dakota Agricultural Weather Network (NDAWN), North Dakota (also adjacent areas of NW-Minnesota and Eastern Montana)	1990–Present	Varies	91 kilometres (57 mi)	agriculturally centered; archive, real-time observations
Oklahoma Mesonet, Oklahoma	1991–Present	Varies	121	comprehensive monitoring; archive, real-time observations
Georgia Automated Weather Network (AEMN), Georgia	1991–Present	Varies	91	agriculture and hydrometeorology; archive, real-time observations, 15 min
Colorado Agricultural Meteorological Network (CoAgMet), Colorado	1992–Present			agriculturally centered; 5 min data, archived
Missouri Mesonet, Missouri	1994–Present	Varies	35	agriculturally centered; archive, real-time observations at 21 stations
WeatherBug (AWS), across United States	1994–Present	Varies	>8,000 **	real-time observations for schools and television stations; collection of multiple mesonets, each typically centered around a host television station's media market
Florida Automated Weather Network (FAWN), Florida	1997–Present	Varies	42	agriculturally-centered; archive, real-time
West Texas Mesonet, West Texas	1999–Present	Varies	63+	archive, real-time observations
Iowa Environmental Mesonet, Iowa	2001–Present	Varies	469*	archive, real-time observations
WeatherFlow, global but concentrated in US	–Present	Varies	450+ mesonet stations in proprietary network; 27,000 in total * **	real-time and archive for variety of purposes, proprietary but reports to public forecasters and numerical modeling systems; operates specialty mesonets and offers PWSs
Solutions Mesonet, Eastern Canada	2002–Present	Varies	600+ *	archive, real-time observations
Western Turkey Mesonet, Turkey	2002–Present	Varies	206+	nowcasting, hydrometeorology
Delaware Environmental Observing System (DEOS), Delaware	2003–Present	Varies	57	archive, real-time observations
South Alabama Mesonet (USA Mesonet), Alabama	2004–Present	Varies	26	archive, real-time observations
Foothills Climate Array, Alberta, Canada	2004–2010	10 km (6.2 mi) average	300	research on spatial-temporal meteorological variation, and on weather and climate model performance, across adjoining mountain, foothills, and prairie topographies
Kentucky Mesonet, Kentucky	2007–Present	Varies	82	archive, real-time observations
Mount Washington Regional Mesonet, New Hampshire	2007–Present		18 (2022)	archive, near-real time observations primarily for orography, operated by Mount Washington Observatory
Quantum Weather Mesonet, St. Louis metropolitan area, Missouri	2008–Present	Varies (average ~5 miles (8.0 km))	100 (proprietary)	utility and nowcasting; archive, real-time observations
North Carolina ECONet, North Carolina	–Present	Varies	99	archive, real-time observations
Weather Telenatics, North America	2010–Present	Varies	(proprietary)	real-time and archived, proprietary; operates micronets, focused on ground transportation and airports but also serves other uses
Birmingham Urban Climate Laboratory (BUCL) Mesonet, Birmingham UK	2012–Present	3 per 1 km^{2} (0.4 sq mi)	24	urban heat island (UHI) monitoring
New York State Mesonet, New York	2015–Present	Varies, averages 20 miles (32 km)	127	real-time observations, improved forecasting
TexMesonet, Texas	2016–Present	Varies	100 in network; 3,151 total * **	hydrometeorology and hydrology focused network operated by the Texas Water Development Board, plus network of networks; some real-time observations, archival
New Jersey Weather & Climate Network (NJWxNet), New Jersey	–Present	Varies	66	real-time observations
Keystone Mesonet, Pennsylvania	–Present	Varies		real-time observations, archived; variety of uses, network of networks
Cape Breton Mesonet, Cape Breton Island, with some stations in Newfoundland, Prince Edward Island, and mainland Nova Scotia	–Present	Varies	141+	real-time observations, with archived data available.
COtL (Conditions Over the Landscape) Mesonet, South Australia	2019–Present			agriculturally focused with a particular emphasis on monitoring amenability of weather conditions for crop spraying; a merger of Mid North Mesonet that began operating in 2019 and Riverland & Mallee Mesonet which began in 2021 with additional networks anticipated
Umbria region mesonet, Umbria, Central Italy	≈2020–Present	Varies		network of preexisting networks emerging since 2020 in part to monitor complex topography but with various purposes for constituent networks
Maryland Mesonet, Maryland, USA	2022–Present	Varies	72 planned (2022) 34 operational (2025)	A network that will eventually total 72 stations across Maryland to promote: public safety, transportation, agriculture, climate, and K-12 science. The program is managed by the University of Maryland, with significant input from state and local government agencies, and local partner organizations.
Hawaiʻi Mesonet, Hawaiian Islands	2022–Present	Varies	>95 (2022)	near real-time observations with archives, for a variety of weather and climate uses designed to measure the stark microclimates of Hawaii and as an expansion to local micronets such as HaleNet, HavoNet, HIPPNET, and CraterNet
Wisconsin Environmental Mesonet (Wisconet), Wisconsin	In development		90	near real-time observations with archives, agriculturally focused

* Not all stations owned or operated by network.
** As these are private stations, although QA/QC measures may be taken, these may not be scientific grade, and may lack proper siting, calibration, sensitivity, durability, and maintenance.

Although not labeled a mesonet, the Japan Meteorological Agency (JMA) also maintains a nationwide surface observation network with the density of a mesonet. JMA operates AMeDAS, consisting of approximately 1,300 stations at a spacing of 17 kilometres (11 mi). The network began operating in 1974.

== See also ==
- MesoWest
- Remote Automated Weather Station (RAWS)
- TAMDAR
- Surface weather analysis
- Automated airport weather station
