= Storm scale =

Storm scale or storm-scale may refer to:

- Intensity rating schemes for various types of storms:
  - Antarctica Weather Danger Classification
  - Beaufort scale for storms at sea
  - Geomagnetic storm § Measuring intensity
  - Tornado intensity scales
  - Tropical cyclone intensity scales
- Weather phenomena at meso-gamma scale, about the size of an individual thunderstorm. See Mesoscale meteorology § Subclasses
