= Voluntary observing ship program =

Due to the importance of surface weather observations from the surface of the ocean, the voluntary observing ship program, known as VOS, was set up to train crews how to take weather observations while at sea and also to calibrate weather sensors used aboard ships when they arrive in port, such as barometers and thermometers. An Automatic Voluntary Observing Ships (AVOS) System is an automated weather station that transmits VOS program reports.

== Electronic logbooks ==
Electronic logbook software assists shipboard observers with encoding, checking and transmitting meteorological reports. The Ship Observations Team identifies TurboWin as a commonly used tool for this purpose. The United States National Weather Service states that TurboWin was adopted as standard observations logging and encoding software for its Voluntary Observing Ship program on 13 November 2014.

== See also ==
- Old Weather
- Gulf Stream § History
- AIREP
- PIREP
- Citizen Weather Observer Program
- Phenology
