= Significant Weather Observing Program =

The Significant Weather Observing Program (SWOP) was created at the National Weather Service (NWS) Weather Forecast Office (WFO) in Central Illinois in order to provide forecasters with additional data during and after significant weather events.

== See also ==
- Community Collaborative Rain, Hail and Snow Network (CoCoRaHS)
- Citizen Weather Observer Program (CWOP)
- Skywarn
- Cooperative Observer Program
