= 1997 Spring Creek flood =

1997 flood in Colorado

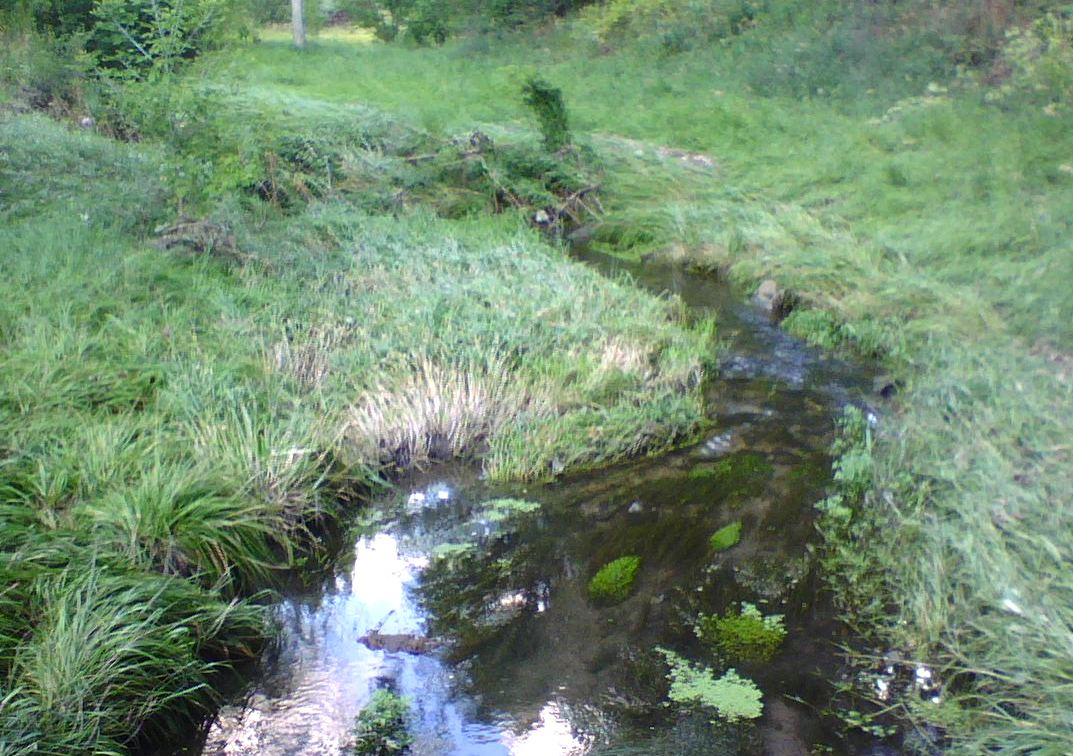
- Spring Creek during minor flooding in 2007
- Cause: Heavy rains

Meteorological history
- Duration: July 27–28, 1997

Flood
- Max. rainfall: 14.5 in (370 mm), western Fort Collins, Colorado, US

Overall effects
- Fatalities: 5
- Injuries: 62
- Damage: >$250 million
- Areas affected: Spring Creek, Fort Collins, Colorado
- Houses destroyed: 200

In a two-day period on July 27–28, 1997, heavy rainfall caused an overflow of the Spring Creek near Fort Collins, Colorado, United States. Stalled convection over the city produced heavy rainfall of up to 14.5 inches (370 mm) across western portions of Fort Collins, causing a flash flood which damaged areas along Spring Creek. Numerous buildings at Colorado State University were inundated by floodwaters, sustaining over US$100 million in damage. Five people were killed, 62 were injured, and damage totaled in excess of $250 million, including more than 2,000 businesses and homes being damaged or destroyed. The flood is the worst natural disaster to impact the Fort Collins, Colorado, area.

== Background ==
Spring Creek is a 12.7-mile-long (20.4 km) tributary of the Cache La Poudre River in the state of Colorado in the United States. It begins at Spring Canyon Dam, and flows into Horsetooth Reservoir, and through Fort Collins. Before the floods, moist atmospheric conditions occurred due to an unusually strong flow of monsoon moisture, despite the area experiencing drought conditions for six weeks. A $5-million mitigation plan was also implemented before the flood. The average precipitation annually in the Fort Collins area near a Spring Creek drainage was 14 inches (360 mm) before the disaster.

== Meteorological synopsis ==
On July 27, a cold front moving southward entered portions of northern Colorado as cooler air was pushed toward the state from a high-pressure area centered over southern Canada. Moisture also pushed into Colorado from the south, above the approaching cold front, as easterly winds pushed into eastern portions of the state moist, extremely humid surface air that was previously located over Kansas. The humid surface air then moved and saturated into the Front Range, resulting in the development of slow-moving thunderstorms into the next day. While this occurred, convection developed over Fort Collins, producing heavy rainfall of up to 14.5 inches (370 mm) across western portions of the city, including 10 inches (250 mm) of rain falling within five hours. The heavy rainfall overwhelmed drains and caused debris to block a railroad passage, resulting in a flash flood across Fort Collins. After the floods, moist air remained for several days over the state, eventually resulting in more convection developing that missed impacting already-impacted areas in Fort Collins and Larimer County, Colorado, instead inundating farmlands and portions of Sterling and Atwood, Colorado. A Colorado State University climatologist, Nolan Doesken, compared the meteorological conditions in Spring Creek to the 1976 Big Thompson River flood.

== Impact ==
Most of the rain fell across western portions of Fort Collins, near Spring Creek. At Colorado State University, 40 buildings were inundated by floodwaters, including the law enforcement department and television station at the university, causing over $100 million in damage. In a basement in one of the buildings, damages to textbooks totaled up to $1 million, along with an additional 425,000 books kept at a nearby library damaged. A 15-foot (4.6 m) railroad embankment overflowed after being hit with approximately 8,250 cubic feet (234 m^{3}) of water per second, which caused a train to derail. The floods killed five people, injured 62 people, and caused property damage in excess of $250 million, including more than 2,000 businesses and homes being damaged or destroyed. Four of the five fatalities occurred at a mobile home park, where floodwaters increased over 5 feet (150 cm) in three minutes, destroying the mobile home park and another trailer park. Several of the injured were transported to Poudre Valley Hospital for medical treatment, including hypothermia from the floodwaters and lacerations sustained from broken windows. The rainfall in Fort Collins on July 28 was the heaviest in an urban area in the state, and also set three, six, and twenty-four hour-rainfall records. Additionally, across the Fort Collins area, the flood was the worst natural disaster ever there.

== Aftermath ==
After the flood, 400 people were rescued. A documentary film was made detailing the flood and the reconstruction after the disaster. A high water marker was erected at Colorado State University designating the water level during the flood at Spring Creek, and flood-height poles were also built. Following the flood, flood management projects and further mitigation measures were enacted, which cost $50 million. A system used for flood warnings was also initiated, which was supported by the Federal Emergency Management Agency. New structures were also built in Fort Collins as improvements, which included channels and retaining walls being situated. The Community Collaborative Rain, Hail and Snow Network was also created as a result of the floods, first beginning in Larimer County in 1998. Events were also set up to commemorate 20 years after the disaster in 2017.
