= Antarctica Weather Danger Classification =

Antarctica weather classification system

The weather in Antarctica can be highly variable, and weather conditions will oftentimes change dramatically in a short period of time. Weather conditions on the continent are classified in a number of ways, and restrictions placed upon workers and other staff vary both by stations and by nations.

== McMurdo Station (USA) ==
Below is the classification for weather conditions at McMurdo Station:

Condition	Criteria	Example
Condition 3 / Normal Condition 3	Must meet all of the following criteria: Visibility is either greater than 1/4 mile (400 m), or it falls to 1/4 mile or less for less than one minute at a time; Windspeed is either below 48 knots (89 km/h; 55 mph), or it reaches 48 knots or above for less than one minute at a time; Air temperature and wind chill are either above −75 °F (−59 °C), or falls to −75 °F or below for less than one minute at a time	
Condition 2 / Severe Condition 2	Must meet all of the following criteria: Visibility is either greater than or equal to 100 feet (30 m), or it falls below 100 feet for less than one minute at a time; Windspeed is either less than or equal to 55 knots (102 km/h; 63 mph), or it exceeds 55 knots for less than one minute at a time; Air temperature and wind chill are either −100 °F (−73 °C) or above, or falls below −100 °F for less than one minute at a time; And also must meet one or more of the following criteria: Visibility is less than or equal to 1/4 mile (400 m), sustained for one minute or longer; Windspeed greater than 48 knots (89 km/h; 55 mph), sustained for one minute or longer; Air temperature and/or wind chill of −75 °F (−59 °C) or below, sustained for one minute or longer	
Condition 1 / Severe Condition 1	Must meet one or more of the following criteria: Visibility less than 100 feet (30 m), sustained for one minute or longer; Windspeed over 55 knots (102 km/h; 63 mph), sustained for one minute or longer; Air temperature and/or wind chill below −100 °F (−73 °C), sustained for one minute or longer	

== Scott Base (New Zealand) ==
Below is the classification for weather conditions at Scott Base:

Condition	Criteria
Weather Condition 3	Must meet all of the following criteria: Severe weather is possible within 24 to 48 hours; Visibility is greater than 300 metres (980 ft); Wind less than or equal to 45 knots (83 km/h; 52 mph); Air temperature and wind chill are above −60 °C (−76 °F)
Weather Condition 2	Must meet all of the following criteria: Visibility is greater than 30 metres (98 ft); Windspeed is no greater than 55 knots (102 km/h; 63 mph); Air temperature and wind chill are no colder than −73 °C (−99 °F); And also must meet one or more of the following criteria: Visibility less than 300 metres (980 ft); Windspeed is greater than or equal to 48 knots (89 km/h; 55 mph); Air temperature and/or wind chill of −60 °C (−76 °F) or below
Weather Condition 1	Must meet one or more of the following criteria: Visibility less than 30 metres (98 ft); Windspeed over 55 knots (102 km/h; 63 mph); Air temperature and/or wind chill are below −73 °C (−99 °F)

== See also ==
- Climate of Antarctica
