= Climatological Observers Link =

Meteorological data and networks

The Climatological Observers Link (COL) was founded in 1970 by a small group of amateur meteorologists following the exchange of correspondence in the magazine Weather - published by The Royal Meteorological Society. It is the largest enthusiasts' weather observer network within the United Kingdom. The organisation aims to bring together those with an interest in observing the weather, their observations being compiled into monthly bulletins containing news, data and views.

Stations range from those with a single raingauge to full-size synoptic and official climatological stations. Many of the stations are equipped with a Stevenson screen and Snowdon Raingauge, while some include Campbell–Stokes recorder for measuring sunshine and an Anemometer. Increasingly, members are employing Automatic weather stations.

Not only keen to observer the weather, members are keen to share their expertise and information and data is frequently used in school/university projects, and by practitioners of the law and forensic science.
