= Cooperative Observer Program =

US citizen science program

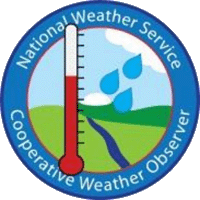
- Abbreviation: COOP
- Formation: 1890
- Purpose: Climatological data gathering, recording, and analysis
- Region served: United States
- Methods: Weather observation
- Fields: Meteorology, climatology, hydrology
- Volunteers: 8000
- Website: www.weather.gov/coop/

The NOAA Cooperative Observer Program (COOP) is a citizen weather observer network run by the U.S. National Weather Service (NWS) and National Centers for Environmental Information (NCEI). Over 8,700 volunteers from the fifty states and all territories report at least daily a variety of weather conditions such as daily maximum and minimum temperatures, 24-hour precipitation totals, including snowfall, and significant weather occurrences throughout a day that are recorded via remarks in observer logs. Some stations also report stream stage or tidal levels.

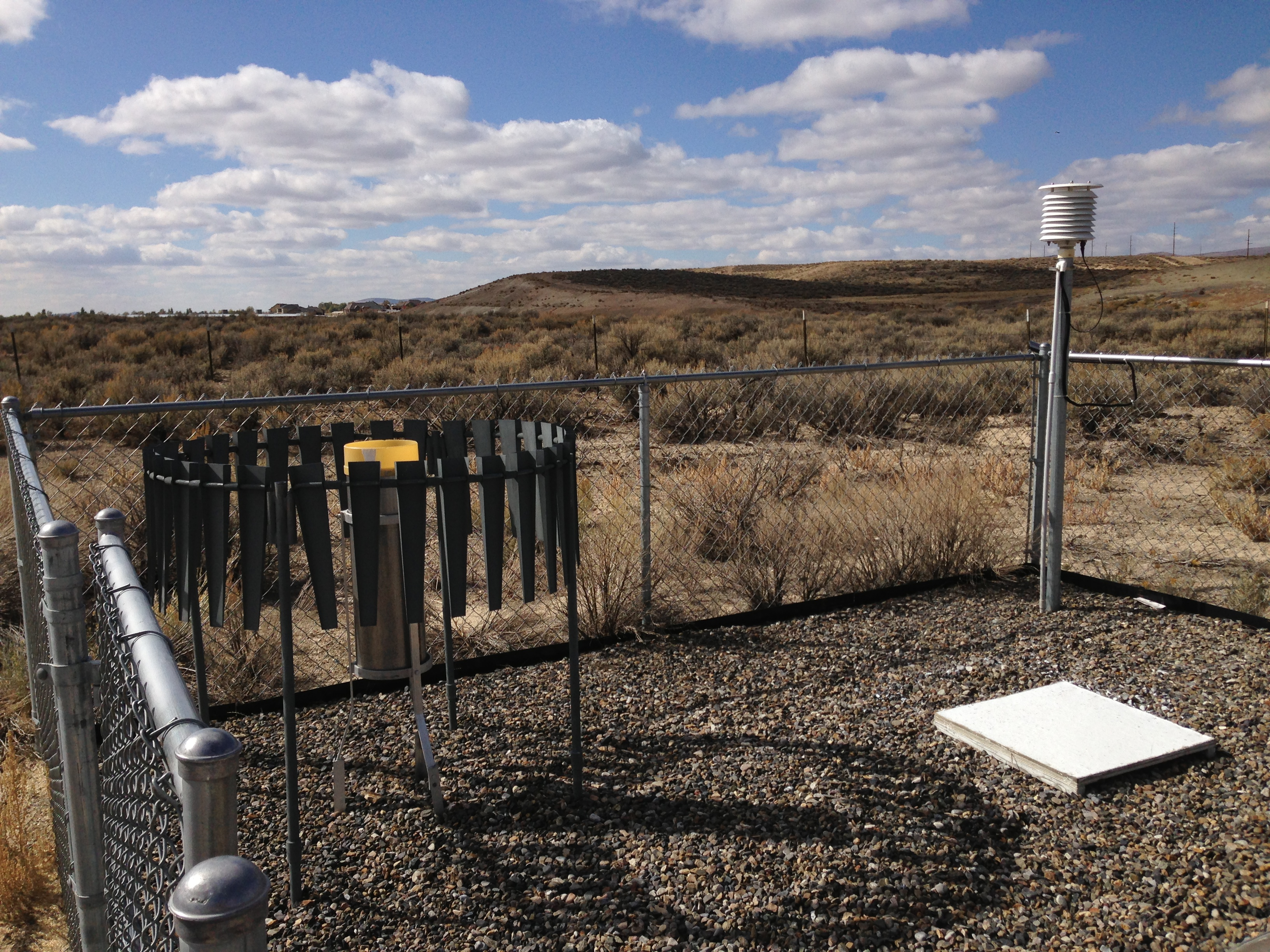
A Cooperative Observer weather station near Elko, Nevada, featuring a rain gauge, thermometer, and snowboard.

Daily observations are reported electronically or over the phone, and monthly logs are submitted electronically or via the mail. Many stations are located in rural areas but the network also includes long-term stations in most urban centers. Observation locations include farms, in urban and suburban areas, National Parks, seashores, and mountaintops. Volunteers are trained by local NWS offices who provide rain gauges, snowsticks, thermometers, or other instruments. Data is initially received and analyzed by local NWS offices then ultimately stored and analyzed by NCEI, which also does final data quality checks. The program began with act of Congress in 1890 and grew out a network of observers developed by the Smithsonian Institution. It was a backbone of the U.S. climatological observation network and remains an important network in providing long-term observations of particular locations.

The Cooperative Weather Observer network consists of manual observations of only a few variables and consists of daily summaries rather than being continuous (i.e. real-time). Because of these limitations and other sensor limitations, as well as to attain a denser network of observations, there has been a move to supplement the coop program using automated weather stations since the 1990s. NWS sponsored programs include the Citizen Weather Observer Program (CWOP) and Community Collaborative Rain, Hail and Snow Network (CoCoRaHS). The coop network predates but grew to supplement significant surface weather observation sites typically located around major airports. Mesonets also supplement these major weather stations and may be official or unofficial, possess varying degrees of rigor, may be temporary or used for specific research project goals, and some (typically for temporary research projects) are even mobile.

== See also ==
- Significant Weather Observing Program (SWOP)
- Skywarn
  - Spotter Network
- Safecast (organization)
- Snow gauge
