= Hazardous weather outlook =

Weather advisory in the United States

In National Weather Service (NWS) terminology, a Hazardous Weather Outlook is a weather statement issued to provide information of potential severe weather events within the next seven days. The outlook may include information about potential severe thunderstorms, heavy rain or flooding, winter weather, extremes temperatures.

== Example of a Hazardous Weather Outlook ==
000
FLUS44 KLZK 221100
HWOLZK

HAZARDOUS WEATHER OUTLOOK
NATIONAL WEATHER SERVICE LITTLE ROCK AR
500 AM CST SUN JAN 22 2012

ARZ003>007-012>016-021>025-030>034-037>047-052>057-062>069-231100-
ARKANSAS-BAXTER-BOONE-BRADLEY-CALHOUN-CLARK-CLEBURNE-CLEVELAND-
CONWAY-DALLAS-DESHA-DREW-FAULKNER-FULTON-GARLAND-GRANT-HOT SPRING-
INDEPENDENCE-IZARD-JACKSON-JEFFERSON-JOHNSON-LINCOLN-LOGAN-LONOKE-
MARION-MONROE-MONTGOMERY-NEWTON-OUACHITA-PERRY-PIKE-POLK-POPE-
PRAIRIE-PULASKI-SALINE-SCOTT-SEARCY-SHARP-STONE-VAN BUREN-WHITE-
WOODRUFF-YELL-
500 AM CST SUN JAN 22 2012

THIS HAZARDOUS WEATHER OUTLOOK IS FOR A LARGE PART OF ARKANSAS.

.DAY ONE...TODAY AND TONIGHT

A SLIGHT TO MODERATE RISK OF SEVERE STORMS WILL BE POSSIBLE OVER
PARTS OF CENTRAL AND EASTERN ARKANSAS THIS AFTERNOON TO EVENING.

EARLY MORNING DENSE FOG WILL CREATE HAZARDOUS DRIVING CONDITIONS
AND AREA MOTORISTS SHOULD USE EXTRA CAUTION. ALSO BRIDGES AND
ELEVATED ROADWAYS MAY BECOME SLICK DUE TO TEMPERATURES AROUND
FREEZING.

OTHERWISE...THE FAST MOVING STRONG STORM SYSTEM AND COLD FRONT
WILL MOVE THROUGH THE REGION TODAY AND TONIGHT...AND DEVELOP
SHOWERS AND THUNDERSTORMS. FACTORS WILL COME TOGETHER FOR
SCATTERED STRONG TO SEVERE STORMS...MAINLY OVER CENTRAL AND
EASTERN ARKANSAS.

THE STORM PREDICTION CENTER HAS ISSUED A SLIGHT RISK OF SEVERE
STORMS FOR MUCH OF CENTRAL ARKANSAS...WHILE A MODERATE RISK OF
SEVERE STORMS FOR MUCH OF EASTERN ARKANSAS. THE SEVERE STORMS WILL
HAVE THE POTENTIAL FOR DAMAGING WINDS AND LARGE HAIL. THERE WILL
ALSO BE AN ISOLATED TORNADO THREAT ESPECIALLY OVER EASTERN
ARKANSAS WHERE WIND FIELDS WILL BECOME MORE FAVORABLE. MAIN TIME
PERIOD OF EXPECTED SEVERE STORM POTENTIAL IS THIS AFTERNOON
THROUGH MIDNIGHT. THIS IS A DEVELOPING WEATHER SITUATION AND
ARKANSAS RESIDENTS SHOULD CLOSELY MONITOR THE WEATHER THIS
AFTERNOON THROUGH TONIGHT.

THE SYSTEM WILL MOVE OUT OF ARKANSAS TONIGHT AND TAKE THE RAIN AND
STORMS TO THE WEST.

.DAYS TWO THROUGH SEVEN...MONDAY THROUGH SATURDAY

THE NEXT STORM SYSTEM WILL LIKELY AFFECT ARKANSAS AROUND MID WEEK
WITH RENEWED CHANCES FOR RAIN AND THUNDERSTORMS.

.SPOTTER INFORMATION STATEMENT...

SPOTTER ACTIVATION MAY BE NEEDED THIS AFTERNOON AND EVENING DUE
TO THE SEVERE WEATHER THREAT.

&&

VISIT NWS LITTLE ROCK ON THE WEB. GO TO HTTP://WEATHER.GOV AND
CLICK ON CENTRAL ARKANSAS.

$$
59
