= Citizen Weather Observer Program =

Network of weather stations based in the United States

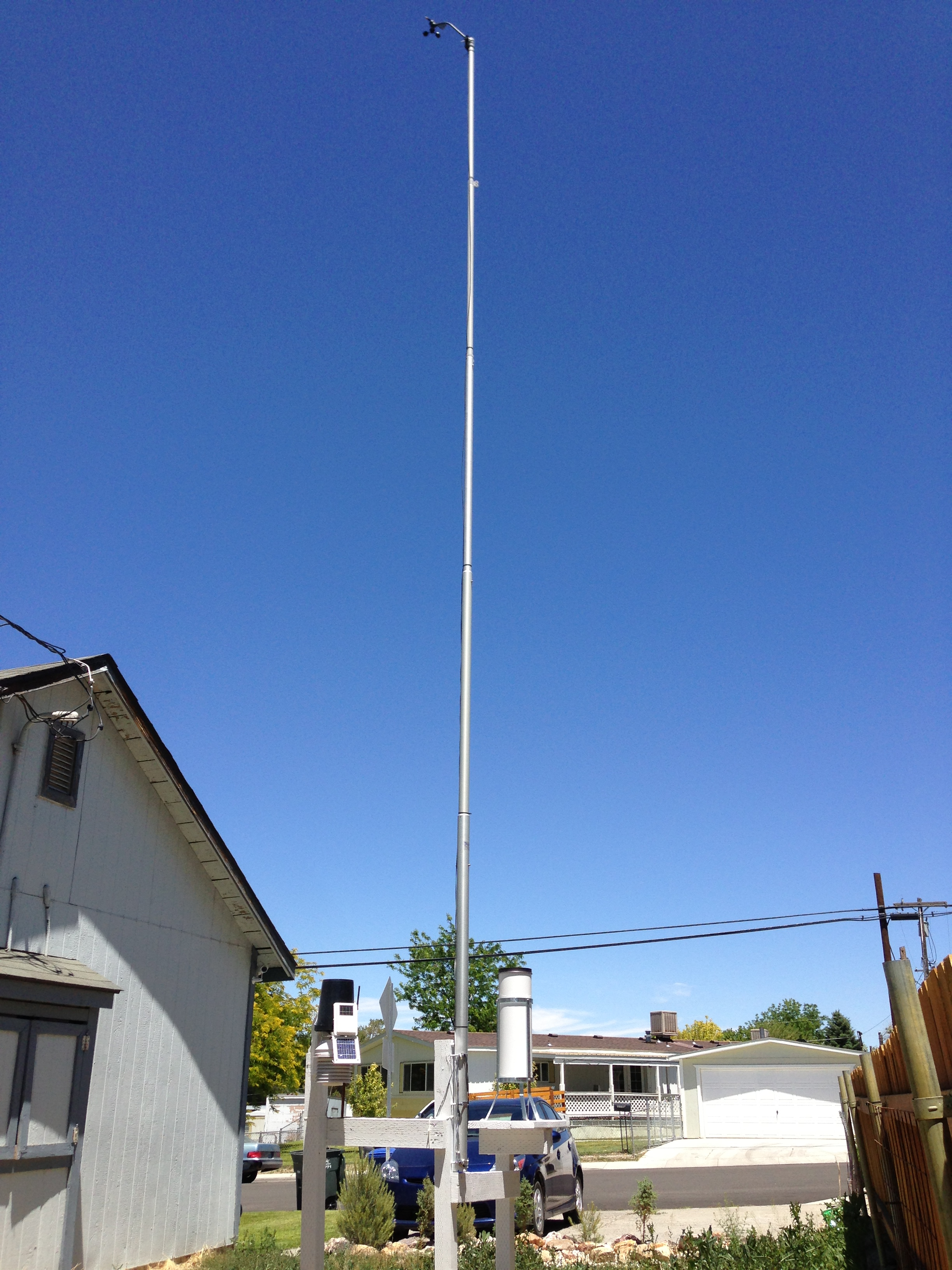
A CWOP home weather station. The mast supports a wind vane and anemometer, while the rain gauge and other sensors are installed near ground level.

The Citizen Weather Observer Program (CWOP) is a network of privately owned electronic weather stations concentrated in the United States but also located in over 150 countries. Network participation allows volunteers with computerized weather stations to send automated surface weather observations to the National Weather Service (NWS) by way of the Meteorological Assimilation Data Ingest System (MADIS). This data is then used by the Rapid Refresh (RAP) and other forecast models to produce forecasts. Observations are also redistributed to the public.

== Origin ==
The CWOP was originally set up by amateur radio operators experimenting with packet radio, but now includes Internet-only connected stations, as well as amateur radio Automatic Packet Reporting System (APRS) stations. As of September 2026, more than 13,000 stations worldwide report regularly to the network.

== Description ==
The Citizen Weather Observer Program is a program to collect surface weather observations from thousands of privately operated weather stations, into the FindU database, and forward it to the Meteorological Assimilation Data Ingest System, operated by the National Oceanic and Atmospheric Administration (NOAA).

=== FindU ===
The FindU database is a set of privately operated Internet servers, run by Steve Dimse, (amateur radio callsign K4HG). Numerous IGates (Internet Gateways) receive broadcast amateur radio Automatic Packet Reporting System (APRS) packets containing position and short messages (including telemetry such weather observations), and forward the data to the FindU servers via APRS-IS on the Internet. Weather observations may be polled directly from FindU, and the data is forwarded to MADIS for ingest. APRS messages may also originate directly from computers on the Internet without being broadcast on the radio waves.

=== MADIS ===
The Meteorological Assimilation Data Ingest System integrates weather observations from numerous different sources, including CWOP via FindU, and drives a number of different weather forecasting products. Incoming data are subjected to temporal and spatial consistency checks, and quality flags are stored with the data, to enable users to access the most trustworthy data possible. From MADIS, CWOP data is also re-distributed to other users such as Mesowest.

=== Ease of sending data ===
The amateur radio connection makes it inexpensive and simple for an individual to install consumer-level weather sensors at a point of interest, connect them to a radio transmitter via a simple APRS modem, and start sharing weather reports with forecasters worldwide. Solar power and radio transmission makes it possible to drop completely self-contained weather sensors on unattended and wireless sites, allowing for a dense set of sample measurements to be collected.

== See also ==
- Mesonet
- Community Collaborative Rain, Hail and Snow Network (CoCoRaHS)
- Cooperative Observer Program
- Significant Weather Observing Program (SWOP)
- Skywarn
- Safecast
