= Weather station =

Facility for atmospheric research and prediction

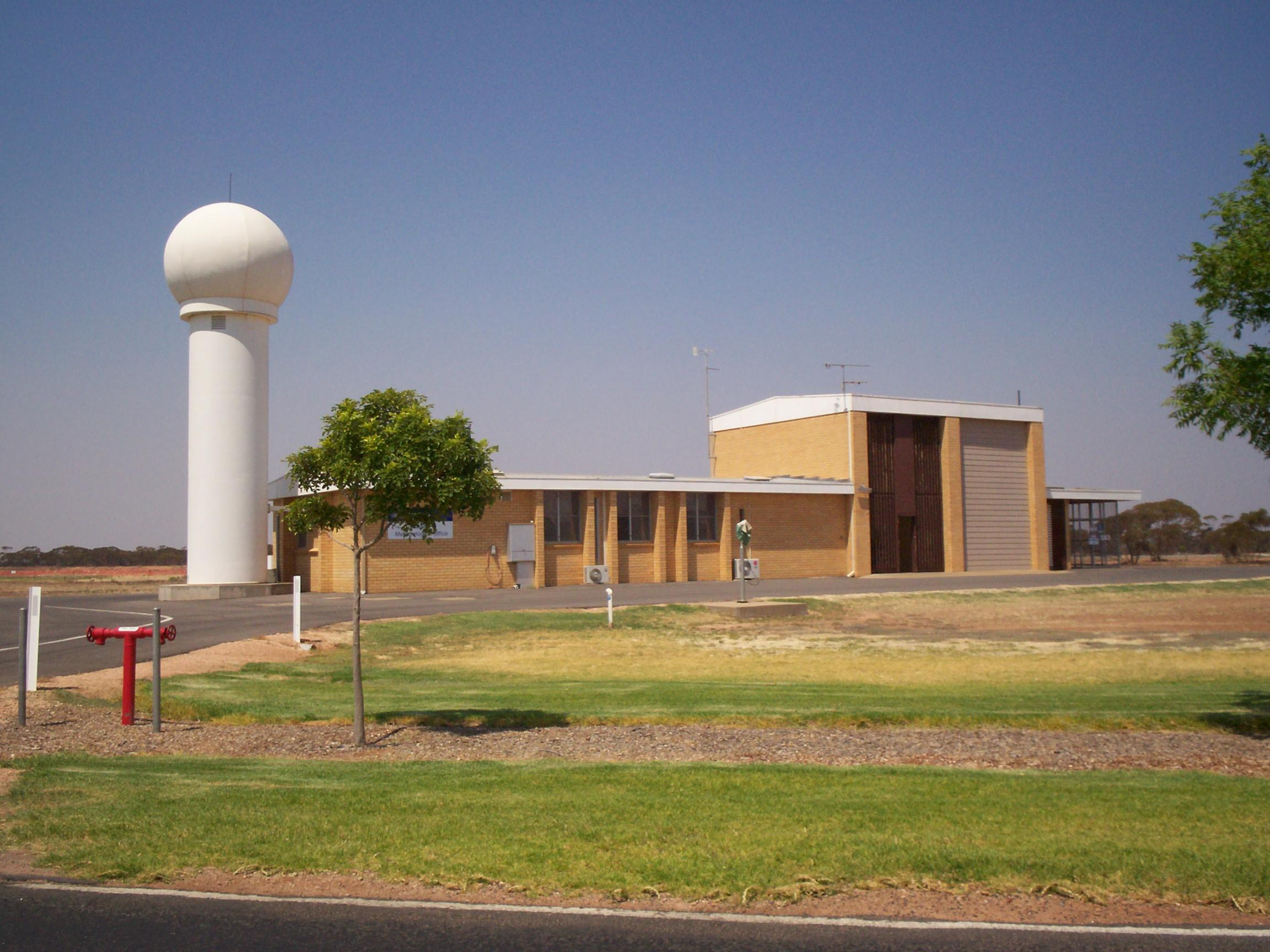
Weather station at Mildura Airport, Victoria, Australia.

A weather station is a facility, either on land or sea, with instruments and equipment for measuring atmospheric conditions to provide information for weather forecasts and to study the weather and climate. The measurements taken include temperature, atmospheric pressure, humidity, wind speed, wind direction, and precipitation amounts. Wind measurements are taken with as few other obstructions as possible, while temperature and humidity measurements are kept free from direct solar radiation, or insolation. Manual observations are taken at least once daily, while automated measurements are taken at least once an hour. Weather conditions out at sea are taken by ships and buoys, which measure slightly different meteorological quantities such as sea surface temperature (SST), wave height, and wave period. Drifting weather buoys outnumber their moored versions by a significant amount.

== Weather instruments ==
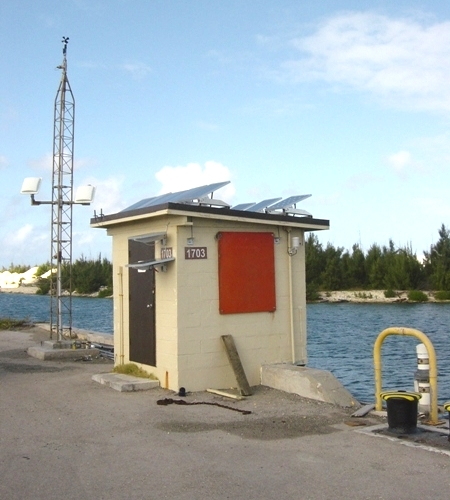
The NOAA weather station at Wake Island harbor measures and transmits data on wind speed, atmospheric pressure, air temperature and tides.

A weather instrument is any device that measures weather related conditions. Since there are a variety of different weather conditions, there are a variety of different weather instruments.

Typical weather stations have the following instruments and sensors:

- Thermometer for measuring air and sea surface temperature
- Barometer for measuring atmospheric pressure
- Hygrometer for measuring humidity
- Anemometer for measuring wind speed
- Pyranometer for measuring solar radiation
- Rain gauge for measuring liquid precipitation over a set period of time.
- Wind sock for measuring general wind speed and wind direction
- Wind vane, also called a weather vane or a weathercock: it shows which way the wind is blowing.
- Evaporation pan for measuring evaporation.

In addition, at certain automated airport weather stations, additional instruments may be employed, including:

- Present weather sensor for identifying falling precipitation
- Disdrometer for measuring drop size distribution
- Transmissometer for measuring visibility
- Ceilometer for measuring cloud ceiling

More sophisticated stations may also measure the ultraviolet index, leaf wetness, soil moisture, soil temperature, water temperature in ponds, lakes, creeks, or rivers, and occasionally other data.

=== Exposure ===
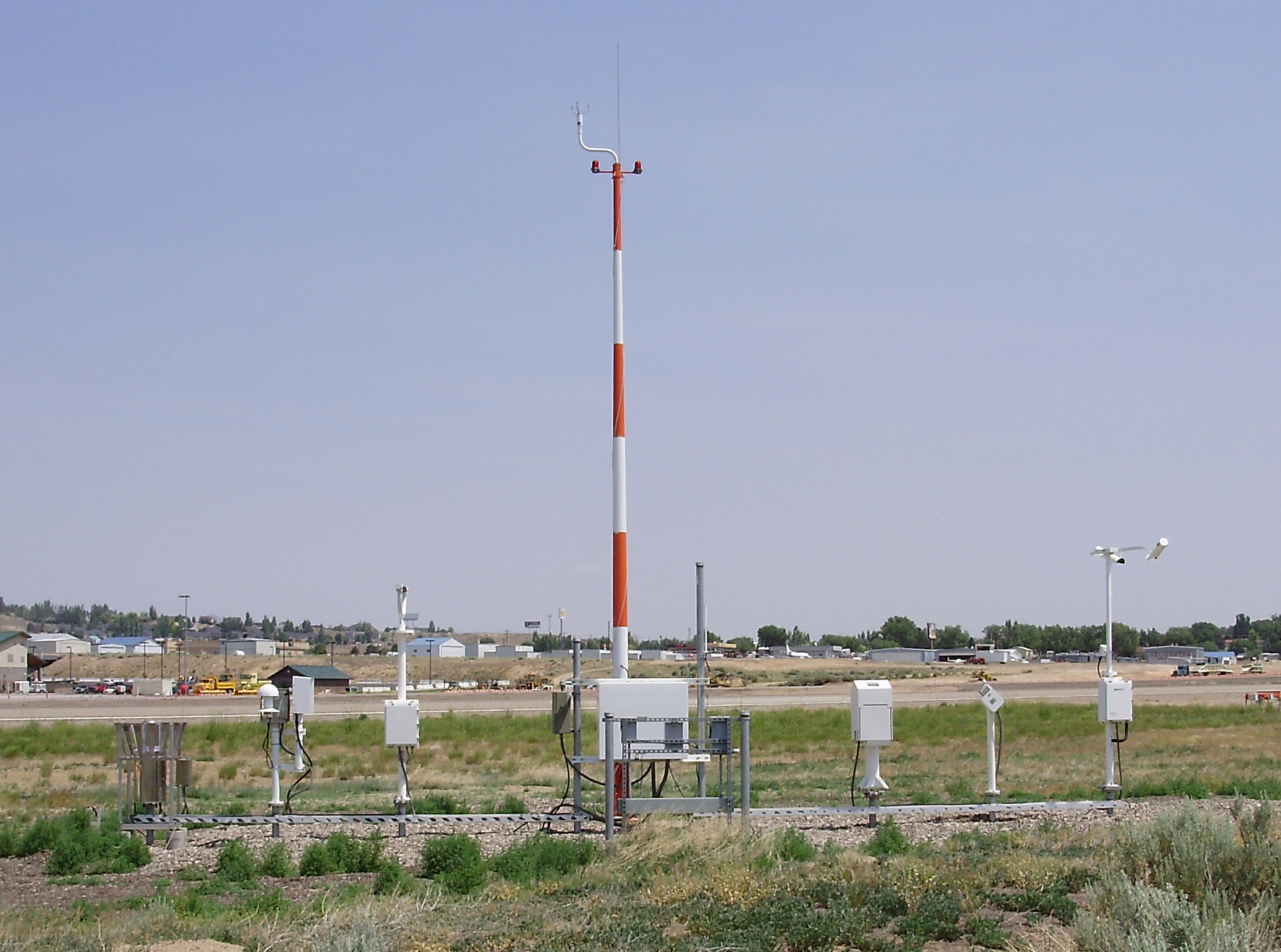
Automated Surface Observing Stations are the source of the most commonly cited weather reports in the United States, located at airports in all major cities and most smaller ones.

Except for those instruments requiring direct exposure to the elements (anemometer, rain gauge), the instruments should be sheltered in a vented box, usually a Stevenson screen, to keep direct sunlight off the thermometer and wind off the hygrometer. The instrumentation may be specialized to allow for periodic recording, otherwise significant manual labour is required for record keeping. Automatic transmission of data, in a format such as METAR, is also desirable as many weather stations' data is required for weather forecasting.

== Personal weather station ==
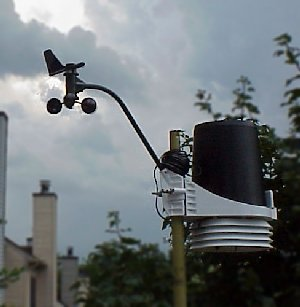
Roof-mounted weather station instruments

A personal weather station is a set of weather measuring instruments operated by a private individual, club, association, or business (where obtaining and distributing weather data is not a part of the entity's business operation). Personal weather stations have become more advanced and can include many different sensors to measure weather conditions. These sensors can vary between models but most measure wind speed, wind direction, outdoor and indoor temperatures, outdoor and indoor humidity, barometric pressure, rainfall, and UV or solar radiation. Other available sensors can measure soil moisture, soil temperature, and leaf wetness. The quality, number of instruments, and placement of personal weather stations can vary widely, making the determination of which stations collect accurate, meaningful, and comparable data difficult. There are a comprehensive number of retail weather stations available.

Personal weather stations typically involve a digital console that provides readouts of the data being collected. These consoles may interface to a personal computer where data can be displayed, stored, and uploaded to websites or data ingestion/distribution systems. Open-source weather stations are available that are designed to be fully customizable by users.

Personal weather stations may be operated solely for the enjoyment and education of the owner, while some owners share their results with others. They do this by manually compiling data and distributing it, distributing data over the Internet, or sharing data via amateur radio. The Citizen Weather Observer Program (CWOP) is a service which facilitates the sharing of information from personal weather stations. This data is submitted through use of software, a personal computer, and internet connection (or amateur radio) and is utilized by groups such as the National Weather Service (NWS) when generating forecast models. Each weather station submitting data to CWOP will also have an individual Web page that depicts the data submitted by that station. The Weather Underground Internet site is another popular destination for the submittal and sharing of data with others around the world. As with CWOP, each station submitting data to Weather Underground has a unique Web page displaying their submitted data. The UK Met Office's Weather Observations Website (WOW) also allows such data to be shared and displayed.

== Dedicated ships ==
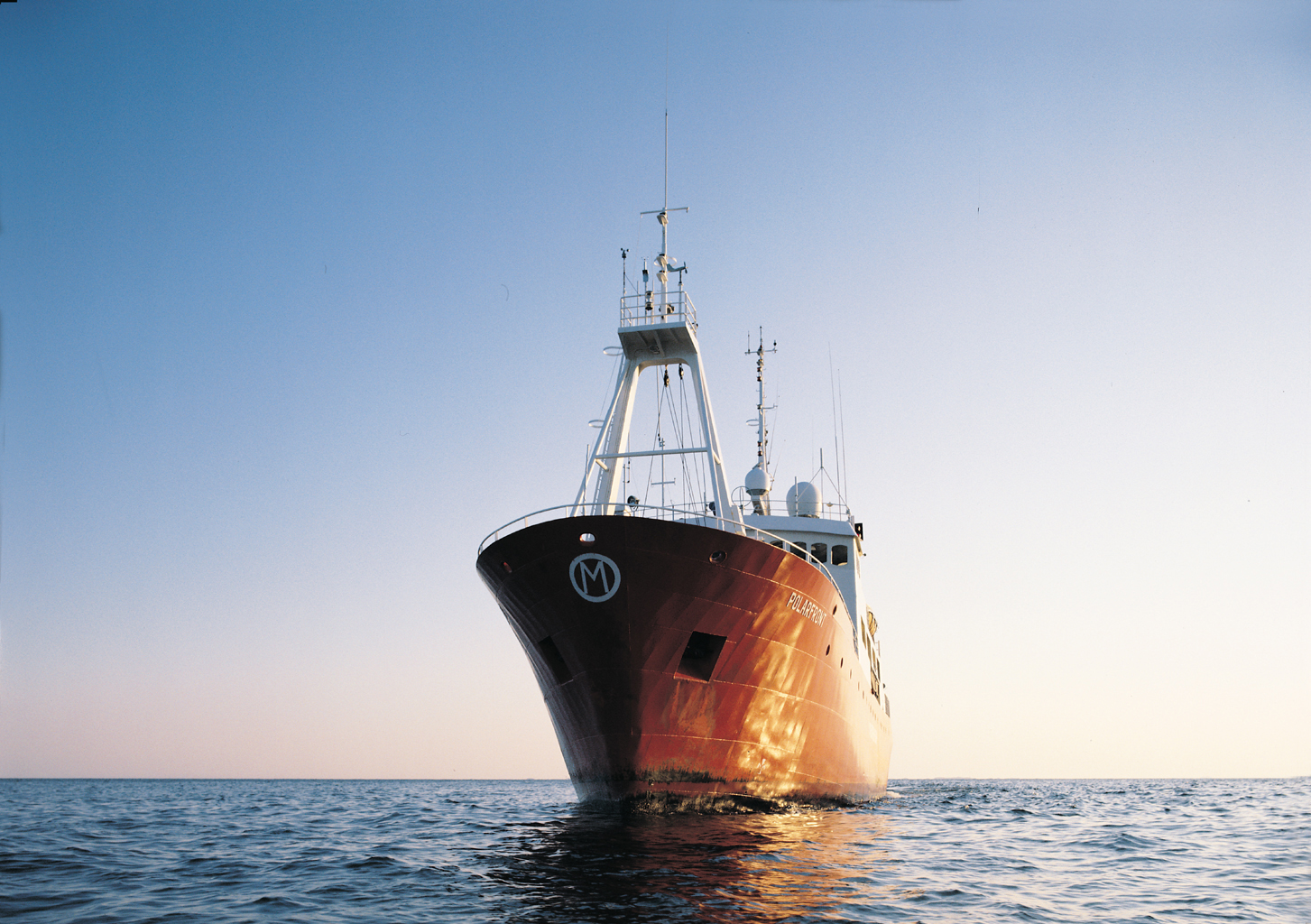
The weather ship MS Polarfront at sea.

A weather ship was a ship stationed in the ocean as a platform for surface and upper air meteorological measurements for use in weather forecasting. It was also meant to aid in search and rescue operations and to support transatlantic flights. The establishment of weather ships proved to be so useful during World War II that the International Civil Aviation Organization (ICAO) established a global network of 13 weather ships in 1948. Of the 12 left in operation in 1996, nine were located in the northern Atlantic Ocean while three were located in the northern Pacific Ocean. The agreement of the weather ships ended in 1990. Weather ship observations proved to be helpful in wind and wave studies, as they did not avoid weather systems like merchant ships tended to and were considered a valuable resource. The last weather ship was MS Polarfront, known as weather station M ("jilindras") at 66°N, 02°E, run by the Norwegian Meteorological Institute. MS Polarfront was removed from service January 1, 2010. Since the 1960s this role has been largely superseded by satellites, long range aircraft and weather buoys. Weather observations from ships continue from thousands of voluntary merchant vessels in routine commercial operation; the Old Weather crowdsourcing project transcribes naval logs from before the era of dedicated ships.

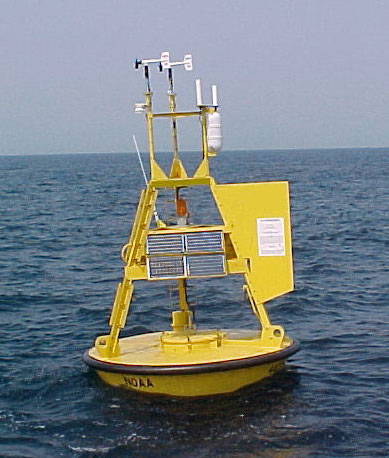
Weather buoy operated by the NOAA National Data Buoy Center

== Dedicated buoys ==
Weather buoys are instruments which collect weather and oceanography data within the world's oceans and lakes. Moored buoys have been in use since 1951, while drifting buoys have been used since the late 1970s. Moored buoys are connected with the seabed using either chains, nylon, or buoyant polypropylene. With the decline of the weather ship, they have taken a more primary role in measuring conditions over the open seas since the 1970s. During the 1980s and 1990s, a network of buoys in the central and eastern tropical Pacific Ocean helped study the El Niño-Southern Oscillation. Moored weather buoys range from 1.5–12 metres (5–40 ft) in diameter, while drifting buoys are smaller, with diameters of 30–40 centimetres (12–16 in). Drifting buoys are the dominant form of weather buoy in sheer number, with 1250 located worldwide. Wind data from buoys has smaller error than that from ships. There are differences in the values of sea surface temperature measurements between the two platforms as well, relating to the depth of the measurement and whether or not the water is heated by the ship which measures the quantity.

== Synoptic weather station ==
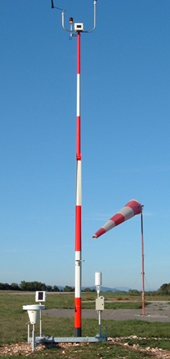
A Synoptic automatic weather station

Synoptic weather stations are instruments which collect meteorological information at synoptic time 00h00, 06h00, 12h00, 18h00 (UTC) and at intermediate synoptic hours 03h00, 09h00, 15h00, 21h00 (UTC). Every weather station has assigned station unique code by WMO for identification.

The common instruments of measure are anemometer, wind vane, pressure sensor, thermometer, hygrometer, and rain gauge.

The weather measures are formatted in special format and transmit to WMO to help the weather forecast model.

== Networks ==
A variety of land-based weather station networks have been set up globally. Some of these are basic to analyzing weather fronts and pressure systems, such as the synoptic observation network, while others are more regional in nature, known as mesonets.

=== Global ===
- Global Climate Observing System
- Citizen Weather Observer Program (CWOP)
- Weather Underground Personal Weather Stations

=== Japan ===
- Automated Meteorological Data Acquisition System (AMeDAS)（アメダス）

=== United States of America ===
- Arizona Meteorological Network (AZMET)
- Central Pennsylvania Volunteer Weather Station Network
- Florida Automated Weather Network (FAWN)
- Georgia Environmental Monitoring Network (GAEMN)
- Indiana Purdue Automated Agricultural Weather Station Network (PAAWS)
- Iowa Environmental Mesonet (IEM)
- MesoWest
- Michigan Automated Weather Network (MAWN)
- Missouri Weather Stations
- National Weather Service Cooperative Observer (COOP) program
- New York State Mesonet
- Oklahoma Mesonet
- The Pacific Northwest Cooperative Agricultural Weather Network

=== Southern Hemisphere ===
- Antarctic Automatic Weather Stations Project
- Australia: Bureau of Meteorology AWS network.
- Australia: Department of Agriculture and Food Western Australia
- Australia: Lower Murray Water Automatic Weather Station Network

== See also ==
- Global Telecommunications System
- Lightning detection
- Surface weather observation and surface weather analysis
- Weather radar
- Weather satellite
- Wind profiler
