= Outline of Washington (state) infrastructure =

Overview of and topical guide to infrastructure of the U.S. state of Washington

The location of the state of Washington in the United States of America

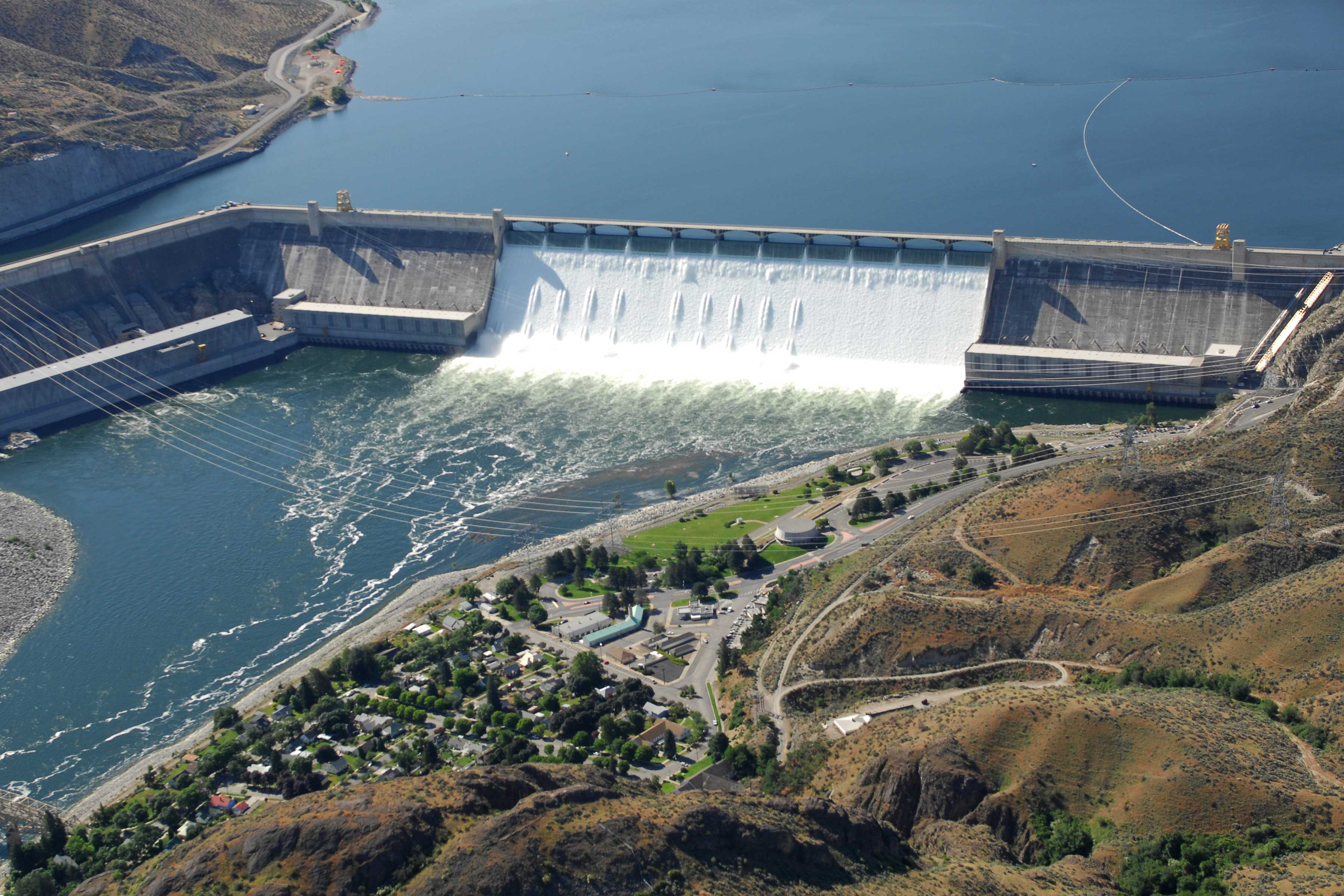
Grand Coulee Dam has long been emblematic of infrastructure in the State of Washington, and is one of two dams mentioned in the official state folk song, Roll On, Columbia, Roll On". But its scale has been eclipsed by several 21st century infrastructure projects.

The following outline is provided as an overview of and topical guide to infrastructure of the U.S. state of Washington.

== By era ==
This section lists a few of the largest infrastructure projects of each century since non-Indigenous settlement.

=== Mid 19th century ===
Initial settlement of the state

- Naches Trails (1853)
- Mullan Road (1859–1860)

=== Late 19th century ===
Early industrialization, Age of Rail

- Cascade Tunnel (1897–1900)
- Stampede Tunnel (1886–1888)

=== 20th century ===
Rapid industrialization during World Wars, suburbanization of Seattle area

- Lake Washington Ship Canal (opens 1917)
- Columbia Basin Project (1933–1950s)
- Hanford Site (1940s through Cold War)
- Mount Baker Tunnel (1940)
- Lake Washington Floating Bridges (1940s–1989)
- Boeing Everett Factory (1967)
- Interstate 5 (completed 1969) and Interstate 90 (completed 1993)

=== 21st century ===
- Amazon development in South Lake Union (2008–present)
- Hanford Vit Plant (2023)
- Link light rail (1996–present)
- Connecting Washington (2015–present)

== By topic ==
=== General ===
- List of Seattle megaprojects

=== Communication and computing ===
- Alaska United-East submarine fiber optic cable
- Jim Creek Naval Radio Station
- Northwest Open Access Network
- PC-1 transpacific submarine fiber optic cable
- Quincy data centers
  - Columbia Data Center
- Seattle Internet Exchange
- Washington-Alaska Military Cable and Telegraph System
- Washington K-20 Network
- LORAN-C transmitter George

=== Energy ===
- Category:Energy infrastructure in Washington (state)
- Electricity in the Puget Sound region
- List of Public Utility Districts of Washington (state)
- Wind power in Washington (state)

==== High Voltage DC (HVDC) ====
- Juan de Fuca Cable Project (abandoned)

==== Hydro ====
Washington is a major hydroelectric producer in the United States and the world. The Grand Coulee Dam on the Columbia River was the world's largest when built, and remains the largest power station in the United States by capacity.

- List of dams in the Columbia River watershed

==== Natural gas ====
- Jackson Prairie Underground Natural Gas Storage Facility
- Northwest Pipeline

==== Nuclear ====
===== Commercial power production =====
- Columbia Generating Station
- Kiket Island, land purchased but never built
- Satsop Nuclear Power Plant, nearly completed but never fueled
- Skagit Nuclear Power Plant, never built

===== Research reactors (civilian) =====
- Fast Flux Test Facility, Hanford Site
- More Hall Annex, formerly the Nuclear Reactor Building, UW Seattle
- Washington State University Reactor, WSU Pullman

==== Other ====
- Centralia Power Plant, the only coal fired power plant in the state
- Grays Harbor Biodiesel Plant
- Spokane waste-to-energy plant

=== Environmental and scientific ===
==== Weather and climate ====
- AgriMet Pacific Northwest Region (U.S. Bureau of Reclamation)
- AgWeatherNet (Washington State University), crop freezes and hailstorms
- Camano Island Doppler radar
- Langley Hill Doppler radar
- RAWS network (US Forest Service), over 100 sensors in Washington, for assessing wildfire risk and forest health

==== Ocean ====
- NEPTUNE, methane clathrates
- Ocean Observatories Initiative
  - Endurance Array, anoxia events
  - Regional Scale Nodes, methane hydrates and underwater volcanism

==== Natural hazards ====
- Earthquakes and tsunamis
  - Pacific Northwest Seismic Network (Northwest university consortium)
  - Deep-ocean Assessment and Reporting of Tsunamis (National Oceanic and Atmospheric Administration) (Note: As of March 2018, there were five DART buoys off of US West Coast, one of which is approximately 400 km west of Cape Flattery.)
- Volcanism
  - Cascades Volcano Observatory
  - Mount Rainier Volcano Lahar Warning System

==== Space and cosmology ====
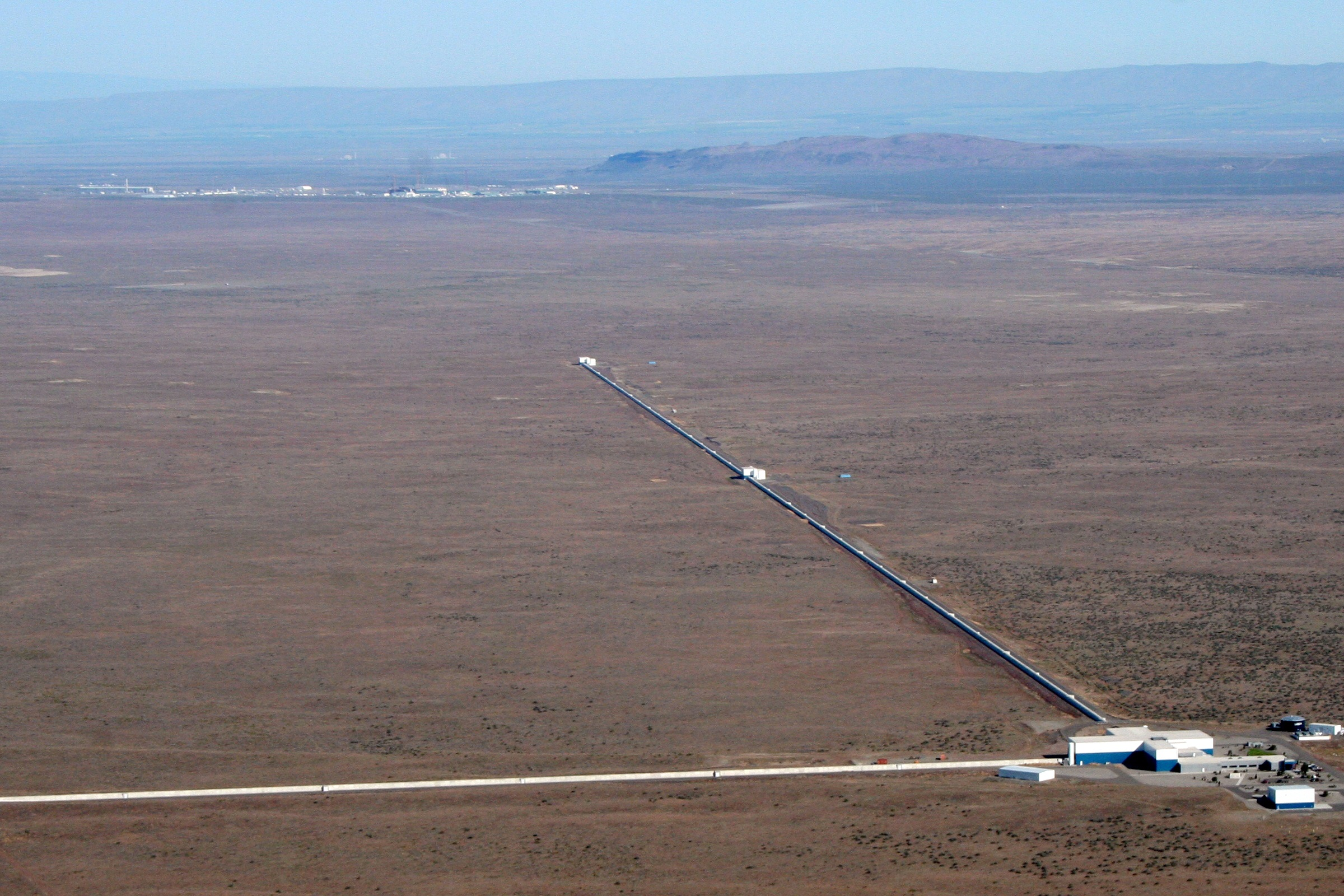
LIGO gravity wave observatory at Hanford, with legs two and a half miles long, is the largest project ever funded by the National Science Foundation. It is one of a pair of instruments used by the scientists awarded the 2017 Nobel Prize in Physics.

- LIGO Hanford
- Manastash Ridge Observatory
- Rattlesnake Mountain Observatory (relocated to Wallula), the largest optical instrument in the state

=== Military complexes ===
==== Army, Navy, Air Force, Joint ====
- Fairchild Air Force Base
- Joint Base Lewis-McChord (also adjacent Camp Murray, Washington National Guard)
- Naval Air Station Whidbey Island
- Naval Base Kitsap
- Naval Magazine Indian Island
- Naval Station Everett
- Puget Sound Naval Shipyard
- Yakima Training Center

===== Former =====
For earlier 19th century forts, see List of forts#Washington

- Fort Lawton, Seattle
- Fort Flagler, Fort Worden, Fort Casey, Puget Sound approaches
- Naval Reserve Armory (Lake Union, Seattle)
- Naval Station Puget Sound (Lake Washington, Seattle)
- Seattle Center Armory
- Yakima Research Station

==== Civilianized airfields ====
For a full list of Army airfields see Washington World War II Army Airfields. The Navy also civilianized several fields.

- Arlington Airport, formerly Arlington Naval Air Auxiliary Facility
- Olympia Regional Airport, formerly a satellite field for McChord Air Force Base
- Sanderson Field, Shelton
- Paine Field at Everett, formerly Paine Air Force Base
- Tri-Cities Airport, formerly Naval Air Station Pasco, one of the busiest training fields of World War II
  - Vista Field, an auxiliary field
- Grant County International Airport at Moses Lake, formerly Larson Air Force Base, a Strategic Air Command base, with 13,500-foot runway and Titan nuclear missile field
- William R. Fairchild International Airport, formerly Port Angeles Army Airfield
- Bowers Airport, formerly Ellensburg Army Airfield
- Ephrata Municipal Airport, formerly Ephrata Army Air Base
- Spokane International Airport, formerly Geiger Field
  - Deer Park Airport, an auxiliary field, also Atlas-E nuclear missile silo 47°58′27″N 117°24′34″W
  - Felts Field, an auxiliary field

==== Department of Energy ====
- Hanford Site
  - Hanford Tank Waste Treatment and Immobilization Plant (Vitrification plant)
  - B Reactor
  - N-Reactor
  - Plutonium Finishing Plant
  - Plutonium-Uranium Extraction Plant / PUREX Plant
  - Plutonium Recycle Test Reactor (PRTR)

==== US Coast Guard ====
- Coast Guard Station Seattle also District 13 headquarters, Sector Puget Sound headquarters, Puget Sound Sector Command Center–Joint, and others
- Coast Guard Station Cape Disappointment

=== Transportation ===
==== Air ====
- List of airports in Washington (state)

==== Rail ====
- List of Washington (state) railroads

==== Road ====
- State highways in Washington
- List of Interstate Highways in Washington
- List of U.S. Routes in Washington
- List of state routes in Washington

==== Ports and canals ====
===== Canals (active) =====
Constructed canals only (Note: Washington has several natural canals including 65-mile (105 km) long Hood Canal)

- Lake Washington Ship Canal / Chittenden Locks (Ballard locks), Seattle
- Port Townsend Ship Canal

===== Canals (abandoned) =====
- Cascade Locks and Canal, Columbia River
- Celilo Canal, Columbia River

===== Ports =====
- Port of Camas-Washougal
- Port of Grays Harbor
- Port of Longview
- Port of Mattawa
- Port of Olympia
- Port of Seattle
- Port of Tacoma
- Port of Vancouver USA
- Port of Whitman County

=== Water management ===
- List of dams and reservoirs in Washington

==== Flood control ====
- McNary Levee System, Columbia River (Tri-Cities)
- Seattle seawall

===== Volcanic =====
Volcano-related infrastructure around Mount St. Helens related to its 1980 eruption and future eruptions

- Spirit Lake Outlet Tunnel
- Toutle River Sediment Retention Structure

==== Flumes and siphons ====
- Columbia Basin Project § Feeder Canal, North and Dry Falls Dams, Banks Lake
- Electron Hydroelectric Project

==== Irrigation ====
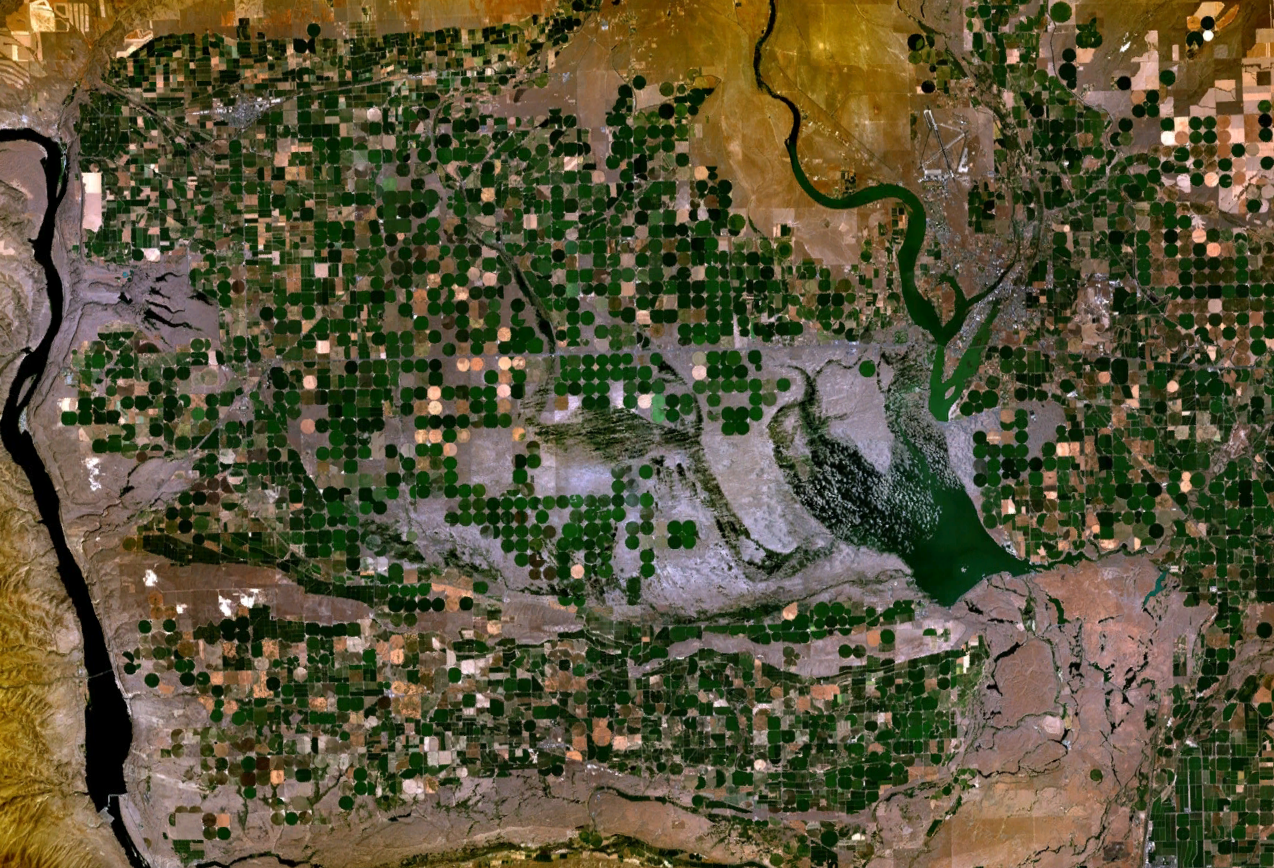
Center pivot irrigation in the Columbia Basin makes mile-wide circles around Potholes Reservoir, visible from space.

- Columbia Basin Project, largest reclamation project in United States
  - Banks Lake, a 27-mile (43 km) long reservoir
  - Potholes Reservoir: 670,000 irrigated acres
  - Grand Coulee Dam
- Okanogan Project
  - Conconully Dam and Reservoir
  - Salmon Lake Dam and Conconully Lake
  - Salmon Creek Diversion Dam
- Yakima Project, 464,000 irrigable acres
  - Bumping Lake
  - Cle Elum Dam / Cle Elum Lake
  - Clear Creek Dam
  - Kachess Dam / Lake Kachess
  - Keechelus Dam
  - Tieton Dam

==== Municipal water supply ====
- Casad Dam (Bremerton watershed)
- McAllister Wellfield (Olympia)
- Culmback Dam / Spada Reservoir (Sultan River - City of Everett)
- Seattle Public Utilities
  - Cedar River (Washington) § River modifications and management – watershed
  - Chester Morse Lake and masonry dam
  - Tolt pipeline (Cascades to Seattle)
- Tacoma Public Utilities
  - Howard A. Hanson Dam and reservoir

==== Wastewater ====
- Brightwater sewage treatment plant (Bothell)
- Everett Water Pollution Control Facility
- Riverside Park Water Reclamation Facility (Spokane)
- South Treatment Plant (Renton)
- Spokane County Regional Water Reclamation Facility
- Tacoma Central Wastewater Treatment Plant
- West Point Treatment Plant (West Point (Seattle))

== By type ==
=== Bridges ===
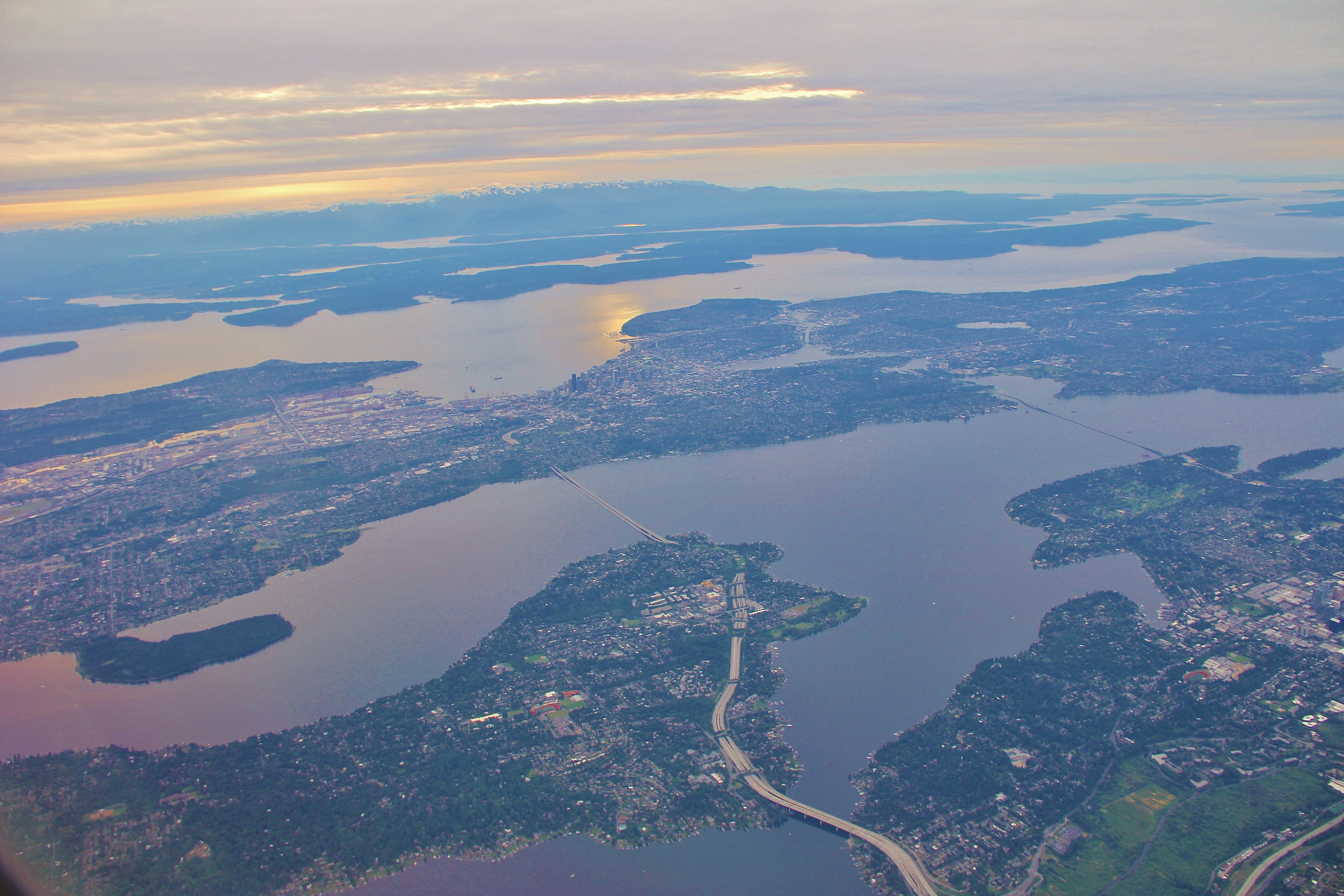
Many bridges are visible in this photograph of the northern Puget Sound area of Washington, including the four floating bridges listed

- Category:Bridges in Washington (state)
- List of bridges in Seattle

==== Floating bridges ====
Washington has more floating bridges than any other state, and the world's three longest ones, including:

- Evergreen Point Floating Bridge (2016) (SR 520 or "Evergreen Point"), replaced the 1963 Evergreen Point Floating Bridge, and is world's longest
- Lacey V. Murrow Memorial Bridge (I-90), second longest in world
- Hood Canal Bridge, world's third longest floating bridge overall, and the longest floating bridge on tidal saltwater
- Homer M. Hadley Memorial Bridge (I-90), fifth longest in world

==== Historically notable bridges and incidents ====
- List of Washington state bridge failures
- Chow Chow Bridge one of the first cable-stayed bridge designs in the United States, and the first in Washington
- Hood Canal Bridge partially sank during storm
- Tacoma Narrows Bridge (1940), "Galloping Gertie", collapsed during windstorm four months after opening
- Lacey V. Murrow Memorial Bridge, sank during storm

=== Dams ===
- List of dams and reservoirs in Washington

=== Pipelines ===
- Avista gas pipeline
- Ferndale Pipeline System
- McChord Pipeline (jet fuel)
- Northwest Pipeline (natural gas)
- Olympic pipeline (Olympic pipeline explosion) (petroleum)
- Tesoro Logistics pipeline
- Trans Mountain Pipeline
- Tolt pipeline (water)

=== Roads ===
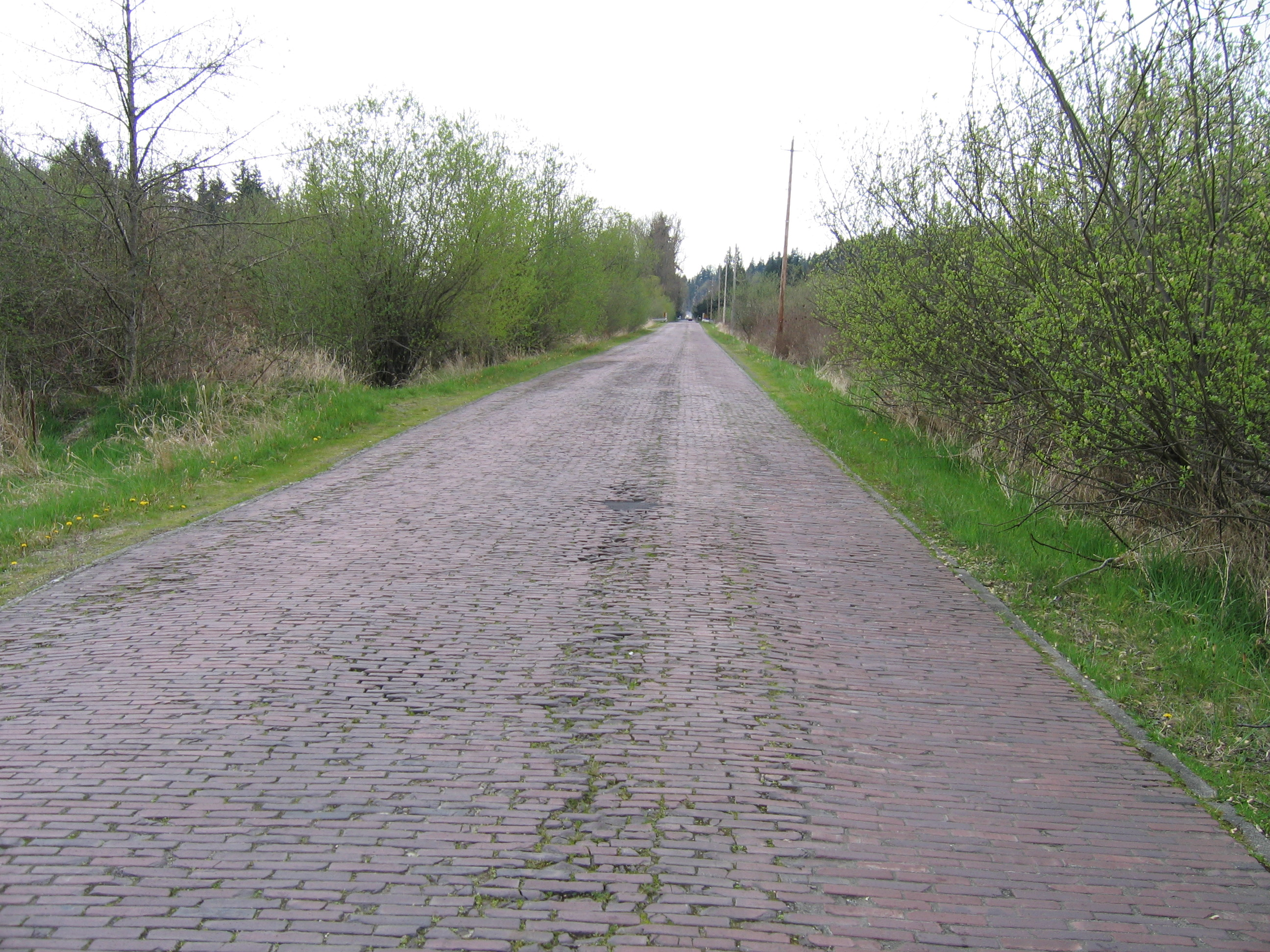
Brick paved section of Yellowstone Trail in Redmond

Historically notable roads include

- Category:Historic trails and roads in Washington (state)
- Oregon Trail wagon trail to Whitman Mission, Walla Walla (1843)
- Naches Trail, first wagon road to cross the Cascades (1853)
- Mullan Road, first improved road (cleared 25 feet (7.6 m) wide) to inland Pacific Northwest (1859–1860)
- Maryhill Loops Road, first asphalt paved road in Washington (1911)
- Yellowstone Trail, first transcontinental automobile highway to Seattle (1912)

=== Tunnels ===
- Cascade Tunnel
- Stampede Tunnel
- List of tunnels in Seattle

=== Highways ===
- State highways in Washington
- List of Interstate Highways in Washington

=== Railroads ===
- Ballard Terminal Railroad
- BNSF Railway
  - Bellingham Subdivision
  - Columbia River Subdivision
  - Kettle Falls Subdivision
  - Lakeside Subdivision
  - Lakeview Subdivision
  - Lakewood Subdivision
  - Scenic Subdivision
  - Seattle Subdivision
  - Spokane Subdivision
  - Sumas Subdivision
  - Yakima Valley Subdivision
- Cascade and Columbia River Railroad
- Central Washington Railroad
- Columbia and Cowlitz Railway
- Eastern Washington Gateway Railroad
- Fairhaven and Southern Railroad
- Kettle Falls International Railway
- Mount Vernon Terminal Railway
- Olympia and Belmore Railroad
- Pend Oreille Valley Railroad
- Puget Sound and Pacific Railroad
- Tacoma Rail
- Tri-City Railroad
- Union Pacific Railroad
- Washington and Idaho Railway

=== Passenger train service ===
- Amtrak
  - Cascades
  - Coast Starlight
  - Empire Builder
  - North Coast Hiawatha
  - Pacific International
  - Pioneer
- Sounder commuter rail

=== Mass transit ===
- Public transportation benefit area
- Sound Transit
  - Link light rail
  - Sound Transit Express
  - Sounder commuter rail
- Seattle Streetcar

== See also ==
- Outline of Washington (state)
