= Outline of Washington infrastructure =

Outline of Washington infrastructure may refer to:

- Outline of Washington (state) infrastructure
- Outline of Washington, D.C., infrastructure
