= S98 =

S98 may refer to:

- S98 (New York City bus) serving Staten Island
- SAS Umkhonto (S98), formerly SAS Emily Hobhouse, a submarine of the South African Navy
- Vista Field, in Benton County, Washington, United States
- S98, a non-geographic postcode in Sheffield, England
