= List of Seattle megaprojects =

This is a list of megaprojects in the Seattle area. For this list, a megaproject follows the often cited definition of $1 billion (2017 dollars) or more.

Name	Type	Status	Cost	Notes
Sound Transit 3	Transit	In progress	$54 billion	Divided between several projects, to open between 2024 and 2041
Vancouver B.C.–Seattle–Portland high-speed railway	Transit	Proposed	$24–$42 billion	Initiative of the Pacific Coast Collaborative between state and provincial governments
State Route 520 bridge replacement and corridor program	Road	In progress	$4.56 billion	New bridge opened in April 2016, rest of corridor anticipated to be complete by 2029
Alaskan Way Viaduct replacement tunnel	Road tunnel	Completed in 2019	$4.25 billion (2009 est.)	
Amazon headquarters, Seattle	Office buildings	In progress	$4 billion	
East Link Extension	Transit line	In progress	$3.7 billion	Scheduled to fully open in 2025
Lynnwood Link Extension	Transit line	Completed in 2024	$2.9 billion	
Interstate 405 (Eastside) improvements	Road	In progress	More than $2.8 billion	2003 Nickel and 2005 Transportation Partnership Account: $1.5 billion; 2015 Connecting Washington package: $1.3 billion
Central Link, Seattle and Tukwila	Transit line	Completed in 2009	$2.44 billion	
Spring District, Bellevue	Urban development	In progress	$2.3 billion	Scheduled to open in phases from 2017 to 2026
Puget Sound Gateway (SR 167 and SR 509)	Road	In progress	$1.989 billion	
Northgate Link tunnel	Transit tunnel	Completed in 2021	$1.9 billion	
Brightwater Tunnel	Sanitation infrastructure	Completed in 2011	$1.8 billion	
University Link tunnel	Transit tunnel	Completed in 2012	$1.7 billion	Completed $200 million under budget. Central Link light rail service began in 2016.
Interstate 5 HOV lanes in Tacoma and Fife	Road expansion	In progress	$1.6 billion	Scheduled to be complete in 2022
Yesler Terrace redevelopment	Urban development	In progress	$1.5 billion	May increase to $1.7 billion
Lincoln Square expansion, Bellevue	Urban development	Completed in late 2017	$1.2 billion	
Seattle–Tacoma International Airport third runway	Airport infrastructure	Completed in 2008	$1.1 billion	Does not include $200 million in soundproofing for schools
Seattle seawall replacement	Shoreline infrastructure	Completed in 2017	$1.07 billion (2014 estimate)	
Mount Baker Tunnel	Road tunnel	Completed in 1986	Over $1 billion	Earliest billion-dollar project on this list
Point Ruston	Urban development	In progress	$1 billion	
Snoqualmie Ridge	Master-planned community	Completed in 2018	$1 billion	Made suburb of Snoqualmie the fastest growing city in Washington (2010)
Hewitt Avenue Trestle replacement (U.S. Route 2, Everett)	Road bridge	Proposed	$620 million to $2 billion	
Puget Sound salmon recovery–culvert replacement	Stream restoration	In progress	$3.7 billion	Began in 1991, expanded by June 2018 U.S. Supreme ruling in favor of tribal fisheries rights. Projected to continue through 2030.

== Other Washington state megaprojects ==
Notable Washington state megaprojects outside the immediate Seattle area include the following:

- Hanford cleanup $113.6 billion
  - Hanford Vitrification Plant $12 to $16.8 billion
- WNP-3 and WNP-5 nuclear power plants up to $24 billion estimated to complete (cancelled, WPPSS default)
- Grand Coulee Dam $5.541 billion in 2017 dollars
  - Third Powerplant (completed 1980) $2.002 billion in 2017 dollars
- North Spokane Corridor (freeway): $1.49 billion
- Lower Snake River Wind Project phase I and II (Tucannon River Wind Farm) $1.33 billion
- Interstate 90 widening near Snoqualmie Pass: $1 billion

== See also ==
- List of megaprojects
- List of tunnels in Seattle
