= Salmon Lake Dam =

Dam in Okanogan County, Washington, USA

Coordinates: 48°33′34″N 119°44′42″W

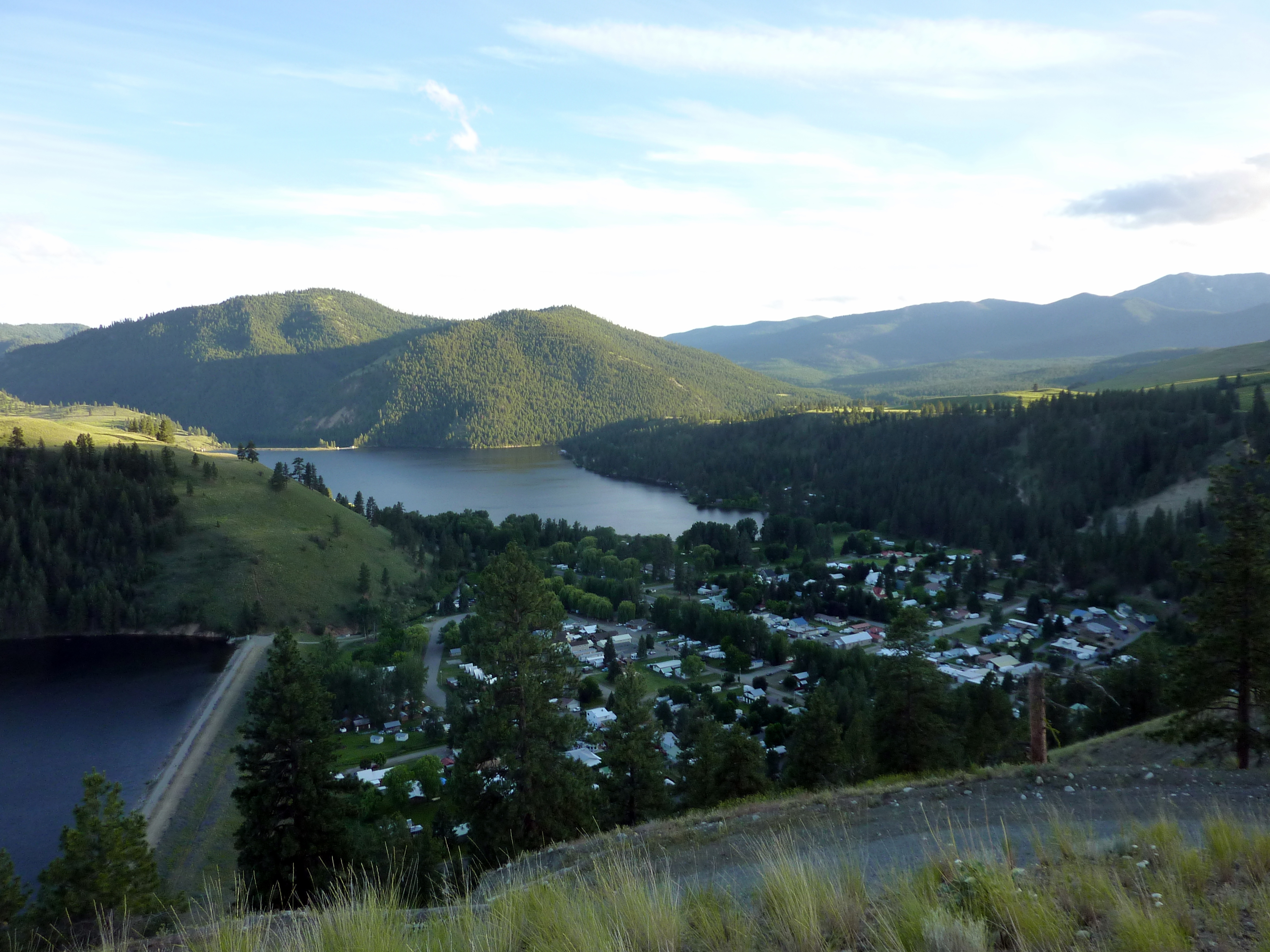
The town of Conconully, Washington from the north, with Conconully Lake and Salmon Lake Dam to the east (left), and the 1911 Conconully Dam and Conconully Reservoir to the south.

Salmon Lake Dam (National ID # WA00291) is a dam in Okanogan County, Washington.

The earthen dam was constructed between 1919 and 1921 by the United States Bureau of Reclamation, with a height of 54 feet and 1260 feet long at its crest.

Salmon Lake Dam impounds Salmon Creek for flood control and irrigation storage, part of the larger Okanogan Project. The adjacent 1911 Conconully Dam and its reservoir, Conconully Reservoir, are also part of the same project. Both are owned by the Bureau and operated by the local Okanogan Irrigation District.

The reservoir it creates, Conconully Lake, has a maximum capacity of 15,700 acre-feet. Recreation includes fishing (for rainbow trout, cutthroat trout and smallmouth bass), boating, camping, hiking and wildlife viewing. Conconully State Park and Conconully National Wildlife Refuge are also nearby.
