= Lake Washington Floating Bridge =

Lake Washington Floating Bridge may refer to the following crossings of Lake Washington between Seattle and its eastern suburbs:

- Lacey V. Murrow Memorial Bridge (opened 1940, rebuilt 1993), originally opened as the Lake Washington Floating Bridge, carries eastbound lanes of Interstate 90
- Homer M. Hadley Memorial Bridge (opened 1989), carries westbound lanes of Interstate 90
- Evergreen Point Floating Bridge (opened 2016), carries Washington State Route 520
  - Evergreen Point Floating Bridge (1963) (opened 1963, closed 2016), the original Washington State Route 520 crossing
