= TAMDAR =

Weather monitoring system

TAMDAR (Tropospheric Airborne Meteorological Data Reporting) is a weather monitoring system that consists of an in situ atmospheric sensor mounted on commercial aircraft for data gathering. It collects information similar to that collected by radiosondes carried aloft by weather balloons. It was developed by AirDat LLC, which was acquired by Panasonic Avionics Corporation in April 2013 and was operated until October 2018 under the name Panasonic Weather Solutions. It is now owned by FLYHT Aerospace Solutions Ltd.

== History ==
In response to a governmental aviation safety initiative in the early 2000s, NASA (Daniels, Tsoucalas), in partnership with the FAA, NOAA, and private industry, sponsored the early development and evaluation of a proprietary multifunction in situ atmospheric sensor for aircraft. The predecessor to Panasonic Weather Solutions, AirDat (formerly ODS of Rapid City, SD), located in Morrisville, North Carolina and Lakewood, Colorado, was formed in 2003 to develop and deploy the Tropospheric Airborne Meteorological Data Reporting (TAMDAR) system based on requirements provided by the Global Systems Division (GSD) of NOAA's Earth System Research Laboratories (ESRL), the FAA, and the World Meteorological Organization (WMO).

The TAMDAR sensor was originally deployed in December 2004 on a fleet of 63 Saab SF340 aircraft operated by Mesaba Airlines in the Great Lakes region of the United States as a part of the NASA-sponsored Great Lakes Fleet Experiment (GLFE). Over the last twelve years, equipage of the sensors has expanded beyond the continental US to include Alaska, the Caribbean, Mexico, Central America, Europe, and Asia. Airlines flying the system include Icelandair, Horizon (Alaska Air Group), Chautauqua (Republic Airways), Piedmont (American Airlines), AeroMéxico, Ravn Alaska, Hageland, PenAir, Silver Airways, and Flybe, as well as a few research aircraft including the UK Met Office BAe-146 FAAM aircraft. Recently, an installation agreement has been reached with a large Southeast Asian airline as well. The TAMDAR system has been in continuous operation since its initial deployment in December 2004.

In 2014, TAMDAR data began being implemented in the national mesonet program consisting of NOAA and its partners.

In October 2018, Panasonic Weather Solutions was acquired by FLYHT Aerospace Solutions, which has integrated TAMDAR with its AFIRs hardware package for airplanes (providing real-time data transmission via satellite connection).

== System capabilities ==
TAMDAR observations include temperature, pressure, winds aloft, relative humidity, icing, and turbulence information which is critical for both aviation safety, the operational efficiency of the U.S. National Airspace System (NAS), and other world airspace management systems as well as other weather-dependent operational environments such as maritime, defense, and energy. Additionally, each observation includes GPS-derived horizontal and vertical (altitude) coordinates, as well as a time stamp to the nearest second. With a continuous stream of observations, TAMDAR provides spatial, temporal resolution, and geographic coverage.

Upper air observing systems are normally subject to latency based on the communication networks used and quality assurance protocol. TAMDAR observations are typically received, processed, quality controlled, and available for distribution or model assimilation in less than one minute from the sampling time. The sensor requires no flight crew involvement; it operates automatically and sampling rates and calibration constants can be adjusted by remote command from a US-based operations center. TAMDAR sensors continuously transmit atmospheric observations via a global satellite network in real-time as the aircraft climbs, cruises, and descends.

The system is normally installed on fixed-wing airframes ranging from small, unmanned aerial systems (UAS) to long-range wide-bodies such as the Boeing 777 or Airbus A380. Upon completion of the installations scheduled for 2015, more than 6,000 daily soundings were produced in North America, Europe, and Asia at more than 400 locations.

=== Icing observations ===
TAMDAR icing data provides high-volume objective icing data available to the airline industry. TAMDAR icing reports provide accurate spatial and temporal distribution of where icing is present. The icing data can be made available in raw observation form, or can be used to improve icing potential model forecasts.

=== Turbulence observations ===
The TAMDAR sensor provides objective, high-resolution eddy dissipation rate (EDR) turbulence observations. This data is collected for both median and peak turbulence measurements and are capable of being sorted on a 7-point scale which are reported as light, moderate, or severe. The EDR data collection process does not depend on aircraft type or configuration, flight conditions, or load.

This turbulence data can be used to alter flight arrival and departure routes. It can be added into models to improve predictions of turbulence conditions, as well as being used as a verification tool for longer-range numerical weather prediction (NWP) based turbulence forecasts. As with the icing observations, the potential utility of this data in air traffic control decision-making for avoidance of turbulence encounters can be significant for cost and flight time.

== Forecast models and validation ==
Third-party studies have been conducted by NOAA-GSD, the National Center for Atmospheric Research (NCAR), and various universities and government agencies to verify the accuracy of TAMDAR data against that of weather balloons and aircraft test instrumentation, as well as quantifying the TAMDAR-related impacts on NWP. Ongoing data denial experiments show that the inclusion of TAMDAR data can significantly improve forecast model accuracy with the greatest gains realized during more dynamic and severe weather events.

Upper air observations are the single most important data set driving a forecast model. Fine-scale regional forecast accuracy is dependent on a representation of the mid and upper-level atmospheric flow, moisture, and wave patterns. If these features are properly analyzed during the model initialization period, then an accurate forecast will ensue. TAMDAR data has been shown to increase forecast accuracy over the U.S. on the order of 30 to 50 percent for a monthly average, even for 3D-Var (GSI) models.

The FAA funded a four-year TAMDAR impact study that was concluded in January 2009. The study was conducted by the Global Systems Division (GSD) of NOAA under an FAA contract to ascertain the potential benefits of including TAMDAR data in the 3D-Var Rapid Update Cycle (RUC) model, which was the current operational aviation-centric model run by National Centers for Environmental Prediction (NCEP). Two parallel versions of the model were run with the control withholding the TAMDAR data. The results of this study concluded that significant gains in forecast skills were achieved with the inclusion of the data despite using 3D-Var assimilation methods. The reduction in 30-day running mean RMS error averaged throughout the contiguous United States within the boundary layer for model state variables were:

- Up to 50% reduction in RH error
- 35% reduction in temperature error
- 15% reduction in wind error

This study was conducted using a 3D-Var model on a 13 km (8.1 mi) horizontal grid. Likewise, the nature of the 30-day mean statistics dilutes the actual impact provided by TAMDAR's higher-resolution data during critical weather events. The forecast skill gain during dynamic events is typically much greater than what is expressed in a monthly average covering the Lower 48. In other words, the increase in model accuracy is greatest during dynamic weather events where air traffic and other operational impacts are greatest.

The Panasonic Weather Solutions RT-FDDA-WRF forecast runs on a North America domain with 4 km (2.5 mi) grid spacing and can include multiple nested 1 km (0.62 mi) domains. A four-year collaborative study with NCAR using the same data as in the studies referenced above has shown that the FDDA/4D-Var assimilation methodology can nearly double the improvement in forecast skill over an identical model running a 3D-Var configuration. Results from this study are summarized below using the same 30-day running mean verification statistics as employed by NOAA. TAMDAR impact using FDDA/4D-Var resulted in:

- Reduction in humidity forecast error of 74%
- Reduction in temperature forecast error of 58%
- Reduction in wind forecast error of 63%

Forecast skill, like the example presented above, is made possible by having (i) an asynoptic in-situ observing system like TAMDAR that streams continuous real-time observations to (ii) a forecast model (deterministic or probabilistic) that has the ability to assimilate asynoptic data in four dimensions.

=== Skew-T profiles ===
TAMDAR sensors are currently set to sample at 300 feet (91 m) intervals on ascent and descent. This resolution can be adjusted in real-time to whatever interval is desired for the receiving forecasting model. The satellite connection to the sensor is a two-way connection so sampling rates, calibration constants, variables and parameters, and reporting frequencies can all be changed remotely from a ground-based location. The sampling rate in cruise is time-based. The soundings, or vertical profiles, are built as each observation is received. All of the profile-based variable calculations (e.g., CAPE, CIN, etc.) are calculated when an aircraft enters cruise or touches down. When an airport is selected, successive soundings can be displayed within a certain time window. This enables the user to view the evolution of the profile.

== See also ==
- Aircraft Meteorological Data Relay (AMDAR)
