= Conconully, Washington =

- Town
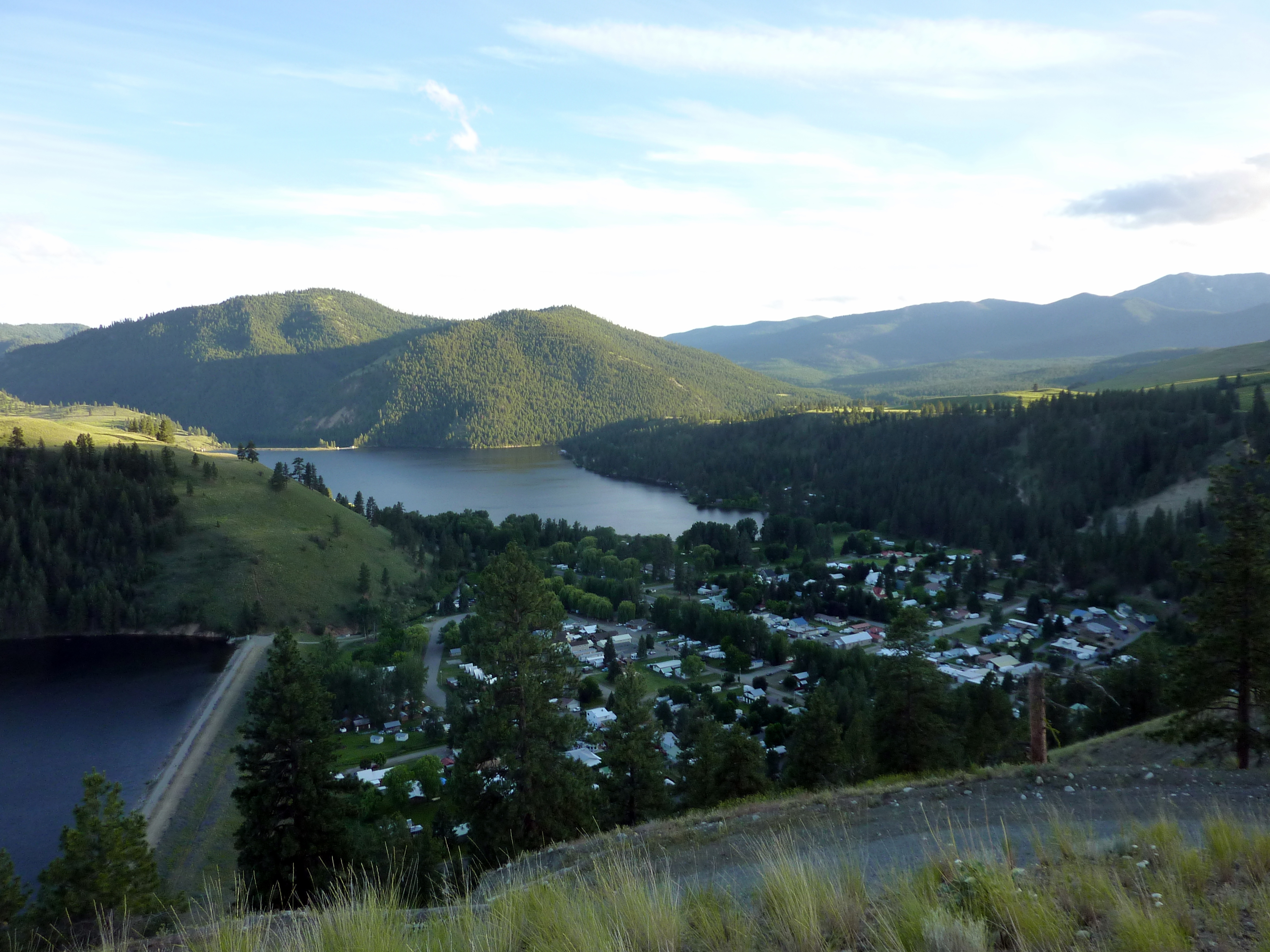
- Overview of Conconully

- Location of Conconully, Washington
- Coordinates: 48°33′32″N 119°45′02″W
- Country: United States
- State: Washington
- County: Okanogan

Government
  - Type: Mayor–council
  - Mayor: Sam Martin

Area
  - Total: 0.21 sq mi (0.55 km^{2})
  - Land: 0.21 sq mi (0.55 km^{2})
  - Water: 0 sq mi (0.00 km^{2})
- Elevation: 2,313 ft (705 m)

Population (2020)
  - Total: 193
  - Density: 910/sq mi (350/km^{2})
- Time zone: UTC-8 (Pacific (PST))
  - Summer (DST): UTC-7 (PDT)
- ZIP code: 98819
- Area code: 509
- FIPS code: 53-14310
- GNIS feature ID: 2413236
- Website: townofconconully.com

Conconully is a town in Okanogan County, Washington, United States. The population was 193 at the 2020 census.

== History ==
The name Conconully comes from the Okanogan name for Salmon Creek, /qʷúnqʷunɬp/, which flows from Conconully to the Okanogan River at Okanogan. According to historian Harry M. Majors, the word means "cloudy". Originally named Salmon City after the nearby Salmon Creek, Conconully began as a gold miners camp, and served as the county seat from 1888 to 1914. It was officially incorporated on November 11, 1908.

On May 27, 1894, the town was devastated when an unusually heavy storm caused Salmon Creek to overflow. Debris-filled water more than 30 feet high rushed through canyons toward the town. One resident witnessed the oncoming flood and rode his horse through town warning the residents. More than 42 buildings were destroyed and one person was killed.

== Geography ==
According to the United States Census Bureau, the town has a total area of 0.31 square miles (0.80 km^{2}), all of it land. The city is flanked by two separate reservoirs of the United States Bureau of Reclamation, created by the 1911 Conconully Dam and the 1921 Salmon Lake Dam.

=== Climate ===
This climatic region is typified by large seasonal temperature differences, with warm to hot (and often humid) summers and cold (sometimes severely cold) winters. According to the Köppen Climate Classification system, Conconully has a humid continental climate, abbreviated "Dfb" on climate maps.

Climate data for Conconully
Month	Jan	Feb	Mar	Apr	May	Jun	Jul	Aug	Sep	Oct	Nov	Dec	Year
Record high °F (°C)	61 (16)	70 (21)	73 (23)	88 (31)	96 (36)	101 (38)	110 (43)	109 (43)	98 (37)	84 (29)	66 (19)	56 (13)	110 (43)
Mean daily maximum °F (°C)	31.3 (−0.4)	39.1 (3.9)	51.4 (10.8)	63.5 (17.5)	71.6 (22.0)	77.9 (25.5)	87.2 (30.7)	85.6 (29.8)	75.7 (24.3)	60.5 (15.8)	42.5 (5.8)	33.6 (0.9)	60 (16)
Mean daily minimum °F (°C)	17.8 (−7.9)	20.7 (−6.3)	27.9 (−2.3)	33.4 (0.8)	40.2 (4.6)	45.7 (7.6)	49.2 (9.6)	47.3 (8.5)	41.3 (5.2)	33.9 (1.1)	27.9 (−2.3)	22 (−6)	33.9 (1.1)
Record low °F (°C)	−29 (−34)	−29 (−34)	−17 (−27)	10 (−12)	20 (−7)	29 (−2)	32 (0)	27 (−3)	20 (−7)	6 (−14)	−18 (−28)	−31 (−35)	−31 (−35)
Average precipitation inches (mm)	1.42 (36)	1.26 (32)	1.16 (29)	1.04 (26)	1.46 (37)	1.58 (40)	0.81 (21)	0.82 (21)	0.72 (18)	1.02 (26)	1.63 (41)	1.68 (43)	14.6 (370)
Average snowfall inches (cm)	13.8 (35)	6.7 (17)	2.5 (6.4)	0.5 (1.3)	0 (0)	0 (0)	0 (0)	0 (0)	0 (0)	0.3 (0.76)	5.8 (15)	12.6 (32)	42.2 (107)
Average precipitation days	8	7	6	6	7	8	4	4	4	5	8	9	76

== Demographics ==
Historical population
Census	Pop.	Note	%±
1890	232		—
1910	357		—
1920	270		−24.4%
1930	102		−62.2%
1940	187		83.3%
1950	141		−24.6%
1960	108		−23.4%
1970	122		13.0%
1980	157		28.7%
1990	153		−2.5%
2000	185		20.9%
2010	210		13.5%
2020	193		−8.1%
U.S. Decennial Census; 2020 Census

=== 2010 census ===
As of the 2010 census, there were 210 people, 103 households, and 63 families living in the town. The population density was 677.4 inhabitants per square mile (261.5/km^{2}). There were 189 housing units at an average density of 609.7 per square mile (235.4/km^{2}). The racial makeup of the town was 91.0% White, 0.5% African American, 2.4% Native American, 0.5% Asian, 3.3% from other races, and 2.4% from two or more races. Hispanic or Latino of any race were 5.7% of the population.

There were 103 households, of which 13.6% had children under the age of 18 living with them, 55.3% were married couples living together, 2.9% had a female householder with no husband present, 2.9% had a male householder with no wife present, and 38.8% were non-families. 31.1% of all households were made up of individuals, and 7.7% had someone living alone who was 65 years of age or older. The average household size was 2.04 and the average family size was 2.49.

The median age in the town was 55.1 years. 12.4% of residents were under the age of 18; 5.6% were between the ages of 18 and 24; 11.9% were from 25 to 44; 43.4% were from 45 to 64; and 26.7% were 65 years of age or older. The gender makeup of the town was 51.9% male and 48.1% female.

=== 2000 census ===
As of the 2000 census, there were 185 people, 94 households, and 53 families living in the town. The population density was 834.3 people per square mile (324.7/km^{2}). There were 192 housing units at an average density of 865.8 per square mile (337.0/km^{2}). The racial makeup of the town was 96.22% White, 3.24% Native American, and 0.54% from two or more races.

There were 94 households, out of which 13.8% had children under the age of 18 living with them, 47.9% were married couples living together, 6.4% had a female householder with no husband present, and 42.6% were non-families. 31.9% of all households were made up of individuals, and 12.8% had someone living alone who was 65 years of age or older. The average household size was 1.97 and the average family size was 2.43.

In the town, the population was spread out, with 11.9% under the age of 18, 3.8% from 18 to 24, 21.6% from 25 to 44, 32.4% from 45 to 64, and 30.3% who were 65 years of age or older. The median age was 52 years. For every 100 females, there were 107.9 males. For every 100 females age 18 and over, there were 103.8 males.

The median income for a household in the town was $23,214, and the median income for a family was $24,750. Males had a median income of $29,167 versus $22,000 for females. The per capita income for the town was $16,168. About 17.5% of families and 18.7% of the population were below the poverty line, including 21.7% of those under the age of eighteen and none of those 65 or over.
