= Conconully State Park =

Public recreation area in Washington, US

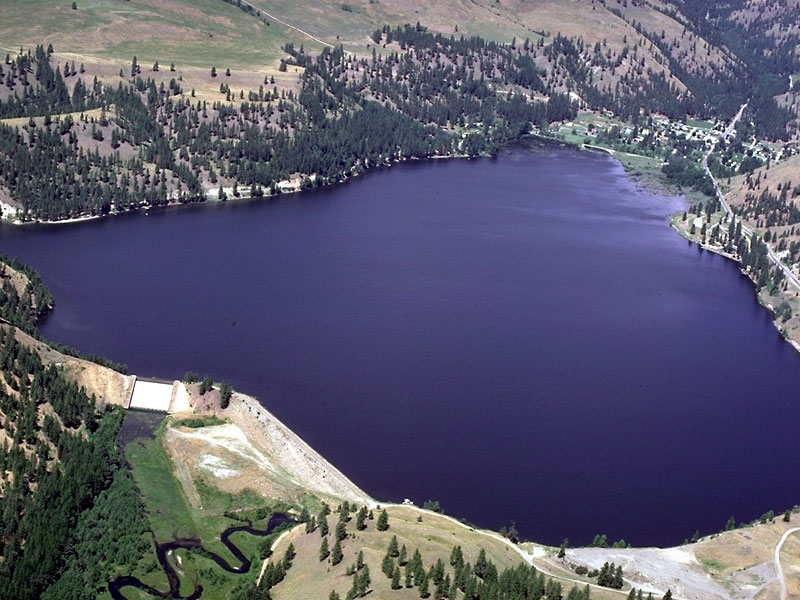
- Conconully dam and reservoir with the state park and town of Conconully at upper right

- Location within Washington (state) Location within the United States
- Interactive map of Conconully State Park
- Location: Okanogan County, Washington, United States
- Coordinates: 48°33′08″N 119°44′50″W
- Area: 87 acres (35 ha)
- Elevation: 2,287 ft (697 m)
- Established: 1945
- Administrator: Washington State Parks and Recreation Commission
- Visitors: 124,888 (in 2024)
- Website: Official website

Conconully State Park is a 97-acre (39 ha) public recreation area located at the north end of Conconully Reservoir in the town of Conconully, Okanogan County, Washington. The reservoir originated with the completion of the Conconully Dam in 1910; the park was created by the Washington State Parks system in 1945. A replica courthouse cabin and the bell from the school that once stood in the park are found on the grounds. The park has 5,400 feet (1,600 m) of shoreline and facilities for camping, boating, and picnicking.
