= Automated Meteorological Data Acquisition System =

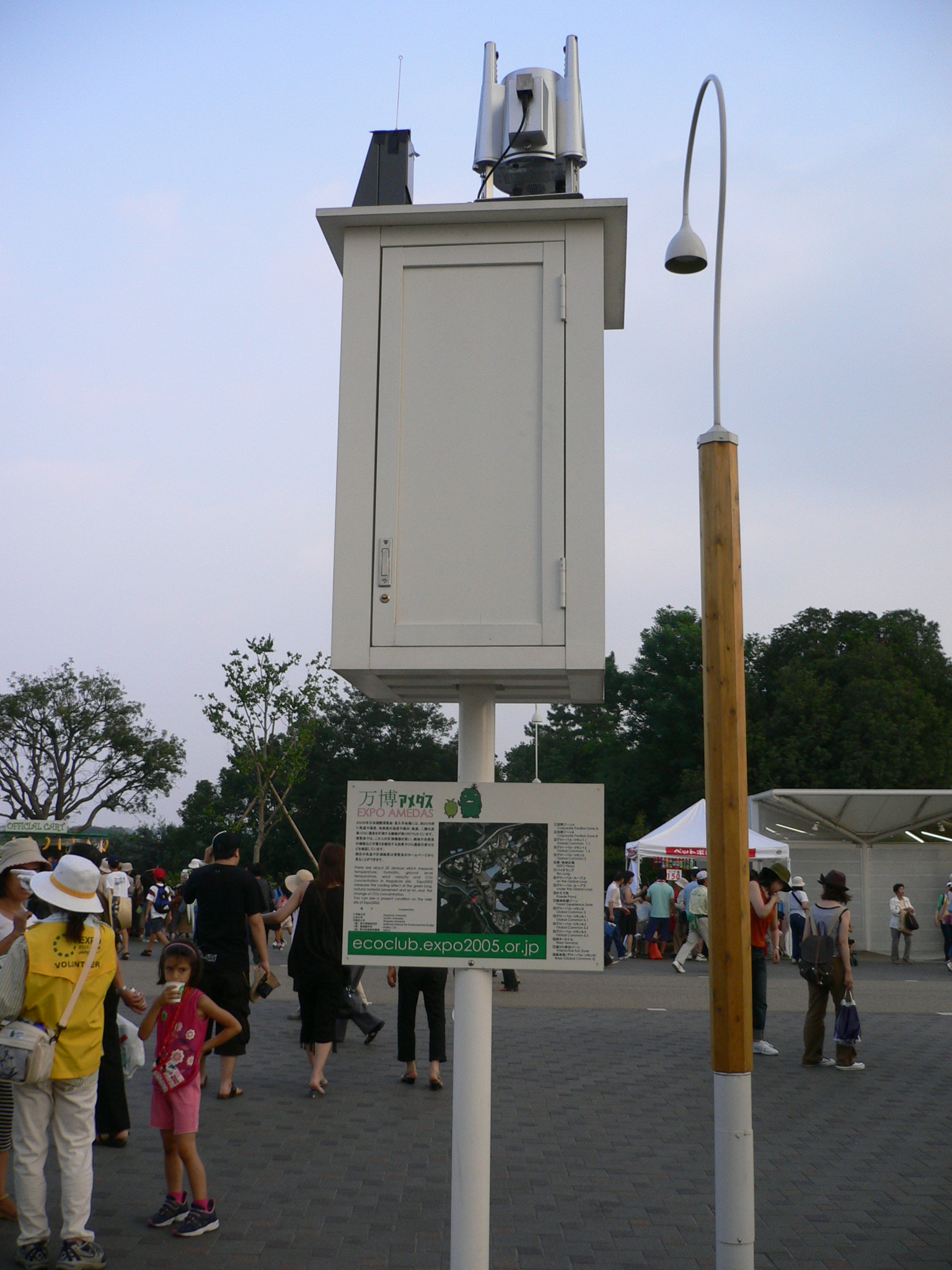
AMeDAS

Automated Meteorological Data Acquisition System (AMeDAS), commonly known in Japanese as "アメダス" (amedasu), is a high-resolution surface observation network developed by the Japan Meteorological Agency (JMA) used for gathering regional weather data and verifying forecast performance. The system began operating on 1 November 1974, and currently comprises 1,300 stations throughout Japan (of which over 1,100 are unstaffed), with an average separation of 17 km (11 mi).

Observations at staffed stations cover weather, wind direction and speed, types and amounts of precipitation, types and base heights of clouds, visibility, air temperature, humidity, sunshine duration, and atmospheric pressure. All of these (except weather, visibility and cloud-related meteorological elements) are observed automatically.

At unstaffed stations, observations are performed every 10 minutes. About 700 of the unstaffed stations observe precipitation, air temperature, wind direction and speed, and sunshine duration, while the other stations observe only precipitation.

For about 280 stations (staffed or unstaffed) located in areas of heavy snowfall, snow depth is also observed.

All the observational data is transmitted to the AMeDAS Center at JMA Headquarters in Tokyo on a real time basis via dedicated telephone lines. The data is then delivered to the whole country after a quality check.

As well as weather conditions, AMeDAS is also used in the observation of natural disasters. Temporary observation points are set up in areas where there are signs of volcanic eruptions or earthquakes.

== See also ==
- Mesonet
