= Riverside Park Water Reclamation Facility =

Coordinates: 47°41′47″N 117°28′31″W

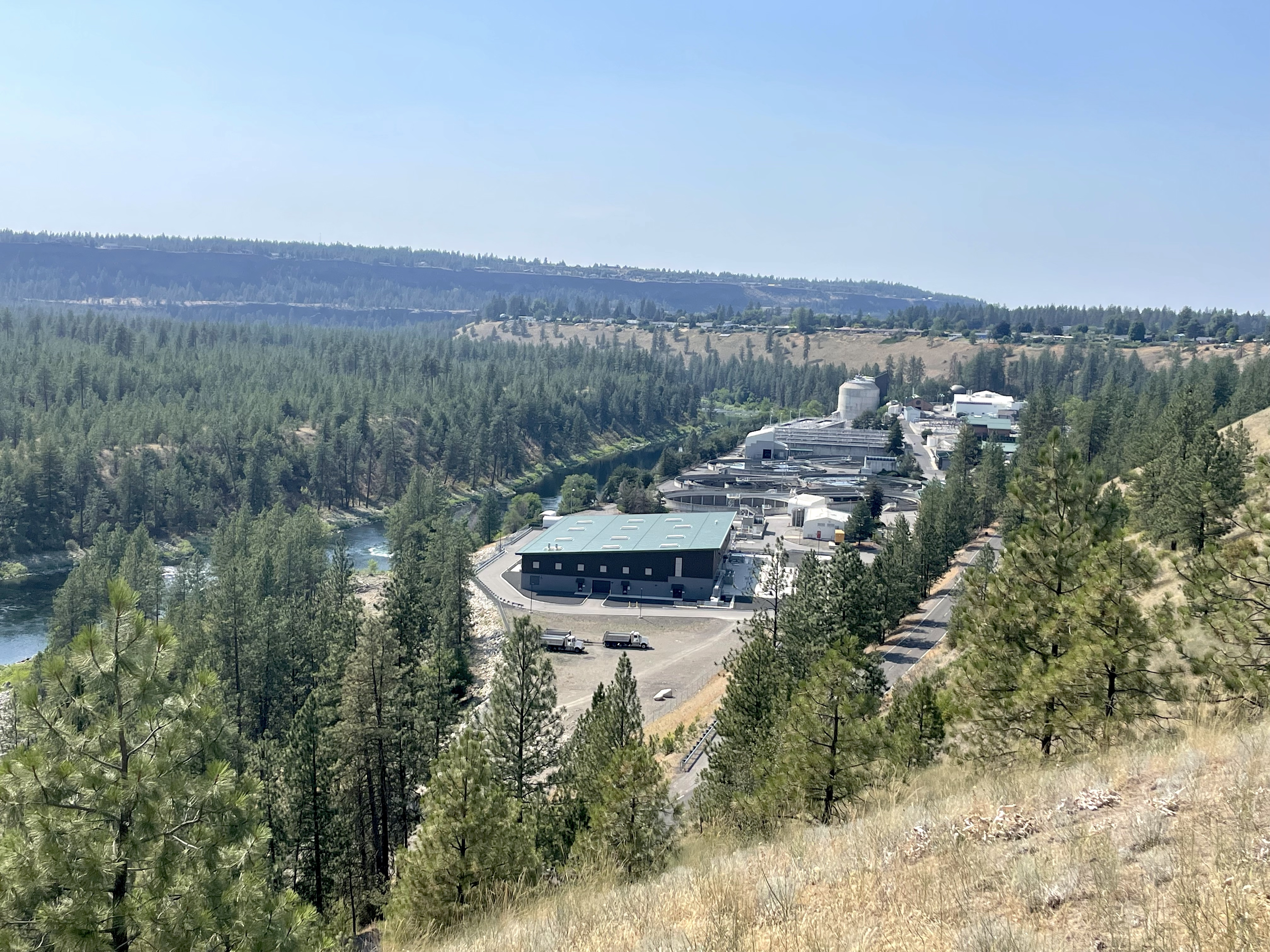

Riverside Park Water Reclamation Facility is the largest wastewater treatment plant for Spokane, capable of handling up to 150 million gallons a day. During low flow periods, the outflow of the plant comprises up to 20% of the Spokane River's water. Until its construction in 1952 (completed 1958), Spokane dumped raw sewage into the Spokane River resulting in recurrent Typhoid fever outbreaks. A $126 million upgrade to increase capacity to 50,000,000 US gallons (190,000,000 L; 42,000,000 imp gal) a day began in 2016, also adding sub-micron membrane technology filtration. It is part of Spokane's $300 million integrated water quality plan.

== See also ==
- Riverside State Park, namesake, across Spokane River
