= AgWeatherNet =

Mesonet run by Washington State University

AgWeatherNet is an automated agricultural weather station network operated by Washington State University in the Pacific Northwest. It is the first and the largest agricultural weather network in the United States. Every 5 seconds, over 175 sensors (as of 2018) record air temperature, relative humidity and dew point, soil temperature at 8 inches, rainfall, wind speed, wind direction, insolation and leaf wetness. The data is reported back from each sensor to WSU's Irrigated Agriculture Research and Extension Center in Prosser, Washington and made available to the public on the Internet. The network can be used to predict and warn of crop hazards such as freezes (especially damaging to Washington fall crops like apples) and hailstorms.

Sensors are located mostly in the irrigated regions of Eastern Washington like the Yakima Valley, but also cover some non-irrigated areas like the Palouse and areas of Western Washington such as the Chehalis River valley. The Oregon Hop Commission funds three sensors in northwest Oregon. Several cranberry farming concerns fund a sensor at Grayland on the Pacific Coast.

The system began in 1988 with the name Public Agricultural Weather System (PAWS).
