= Northwest Open Access Network =

- Type: Non-profit municipal corporation
- Industry: Telecommunications
- Genre: Open-access network
- Founded: c. 1999, Washington State
- Headquarters: Spokane Valley, Washington, United States
- Area served: Pacific Northwest
- Key people: Craig Nelsen, CEO Mike Henson, COO James Wong, CFO John Smith, CTO
- ASN: 16713
- Website: noanet.net

Northwest Open Access Network (NoaNet) is an open-access network in the United States Pacific Northwest region. NoaNet is a public-benefit wholesale telecommunications organization that supplies solutions and resources for all aspects of broadband and telecom projects to serve Washington State including wholesale wide-area and last-mile bandwidth on optic fiber and other means from pooled public utility district (PUD) assets, as well as over 30 colocation centers. It was formed c. 1999 and began operating in 2000 on Bonneville Power Administration-owned fiber. By 2015, it had over 3,000 miles (4,800 km) of fiber.

Membership consists of the following Washington State PUDs: Benton County Public Utility District,Kitsap County PUD, Pend Oreille County PUD, Franklin County PUD, Mason County PUD, Clallam County PUD, Okanogan County PUD, Jefferson County PUD and Pacific County PUD.

NoaNet Oregon began operating in 2004, also on Bonneville Power Administration fiber.

By 2010, NoaNet had received over $100 million in Federal grants under the American Recovery and Reinvestment Act. By 2015 it had completed a four-year $180 million National Telecommunications and Information Administration Broadband Technology Opportunity Program (BTOP) grant. Though NoaNet has made use of federal grant programs, NoaNet does not collect any tax dollars or subsidies from rate payers in Washington State. All revenues from selling wholesale services on the open market are put back into the network to bring network and services into rural areas of the state.

NoaNet connects to the Internet at Seattle Internet Exchange and Northwest Access Exchange in Portland.
