= Evergreen Point Floating Bridge =

Floating bridge carrying a freeway in Seattle, Washington

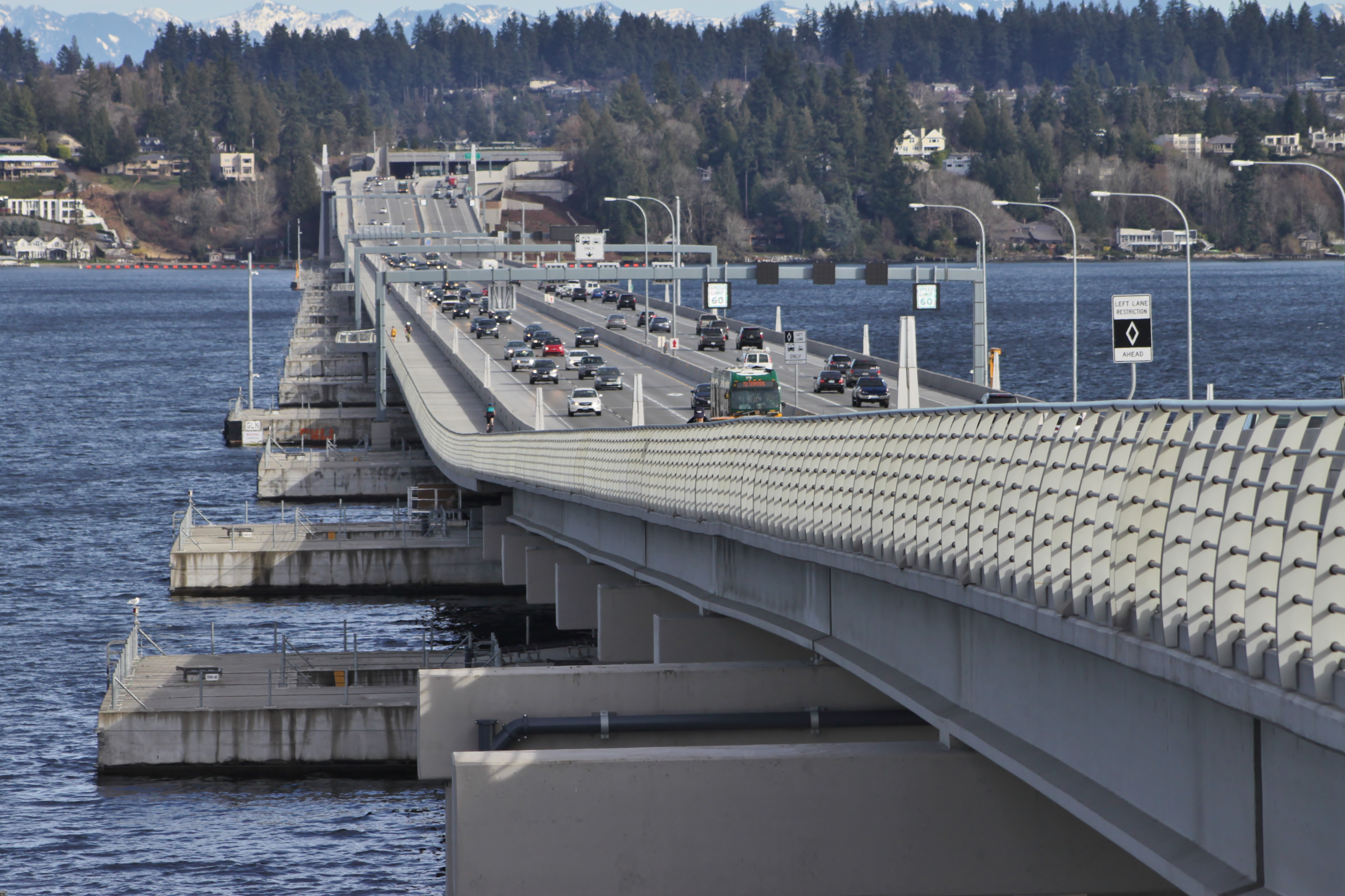
- Looking east from the multi-use trail
- Coordinates: 47.64080°N 122.25926°W
- Carries: SR 520 (6 lanes)
- Crosses: Lake Washington
- Locale: Seattle, Washington
- Official name: The SR 520 Albert D. Rosellini Evergreen Point Floating Bridge
- Named for: Albert Rosellini
- Owner: Washington State Department of Transportation (WSDOT)

Characteristics
- Design: Pontoon bridge
- Material: Precast concrete
- Total length: 7,710 feet (2,350 m)
- Width: 116 feet (35 m) (at midpoint)
- Design life: 75 years

History
- Construction start: 2011
- Construction cost: $4.65 billion (project budget)
- Opened: April 11–25, 2016
- Dedicated: April 2, 2016
- Replaces: Evergreen Point Floating Bridge (1963–2016)

Statistics
- Daily traffic: 57,913 (2023)
- Toll: $1.35–$6.90

Location
- Interactive map of Evergreen Point Floating Bridge

The Evergreen Point Floating Bridge, also known as the 520 Bridge and officially the Governor Albert D. Rosellini Bridge, is a floating bridge that carries Washington State Route 520 across Lake Washington from Seattle to its eastern suburbs. The 7,710-foot-long (2,350 m) floating span is the longest floating bridge in the world, as well as the world's widest, measuring 116 feet (35 m) at its midpoint. It is a toll bridge and uses electronic collection.

The bridge opened in April 2016 and replaced the original Evergreen Point Floating Bridge at the site, which was 130 feet (40 m) shorter and four lanes wide. The original bridge was vulnerable to earthquakes and strong wind events, which would frequently shut down traffic. Planning for a replacement began in 1997 and was approved in 2011; the $4.65 billion budget was derived from state gas taxes and federal sources, as well as toll revenue. Construction of the 77 concrete pontoons began in 2011 and on-site assembly began in 2014.

The Evergreen Point Floating Bridge carries six lanes of traffic—including two lanes for high-occupancy vehicles—and has a multi-use trail for cyclists and pedestrians on its north side. It also carries bus traffic and is designed for a future retrofit that would add light rail service.

== History ==
=== Background ===
The original Evergreen Point Floating Bridge, also named for state governor Albert D. Rosellini, opened on August 28, 1963, carrying the four-lane State Route 520 (at the time designated temporarily as the Evergreen Point branch of Primary State Highway 1 until the 1964 state highway renumbering). The 7,578-foot-long (2,310 m) floating span consisted of 33 pontoons and cost $24.7 million to construct (equivalent to $260 million in 2025); the bridge carried four lanes of traffic, separated by a curb that was later replaced with a simple Jersey barrier; at the center was a drawspan that opened for large vessels traversing the lake. The original bridge would also close to traffic during sustained wind gusts of 50 miles per hour (80 km/h) or higher for more than 15 minutes.

Due to increased traffic generated by rapid growth of the Eastside area, bridge replacement was explored as early as 1969, when building a parallel span was explored and rejected. The Eastside is also served by the Interstate 90 floating bridges completed in 1940 and 1989, carrying traffic across Mercer Island to and from Bellevue.

The original Evergreen Point Floating Bridge was designed before the implementation of modern earthquake engineering standards, with vulnerabilities in its hollow support structures that could have failed in a major earthquake. Additionally, near the end of its lifetime, vibrations induced by storm surges and strong winds were able to compromise the aging drawspan, anchor cables, and pontoons, leading to structural failure in a major storm. Even if the storms were below the maximum threshold for failure to occur, Washington State Department of Transportation (WSDOT) would still close the floating bridge to traffic. Although the original bridge carried two lanes of traffic in each direction, it did not include shoulders or pedestrian and bicycle infrastructure. The lack of a shoulder led to traffic congestion in the event of an accident, which would block one or two lanes in a given direction and block emergency services from accessing the bridge.

=== Planning and funding ===
Planning of the replacement bridge started in 1997 with a cross-lake study conducted by the state Department of Transportation. The study followed several others in the late 20th century to find solutions to traffic on the SR 520 floating bridge, with most proposals rejected after heavy opposition from communities on both ends of the bridge.

The preferred alternative for the bridge's design, with four general-purpose lanes and two HOV lanes, was announced by WSDOT in April 2010. Alternative options included the construction of a southbound onramp from the I-5 express lanes, the addition of light rail to the project, and an eight-lane bridge. The final environmental impact statement for the project was issued in 2011, allowing for construction of the pontoons to begin the following year.

Funding was allocated to major phases of the project at different times. The $4.5 billion in funding comes largely from the state gas tax earmarked for highways in 2005, toll revenue, and federal highway funds and loans. In 2014, the budget for the project was increased by $250 million to cover cost overruns. The western portions of the project in Seattle, which are budgeted at $2 billion, were the last to be funded as part of the 2015 and 2022 legislative transportation packages.

=== Construction ===
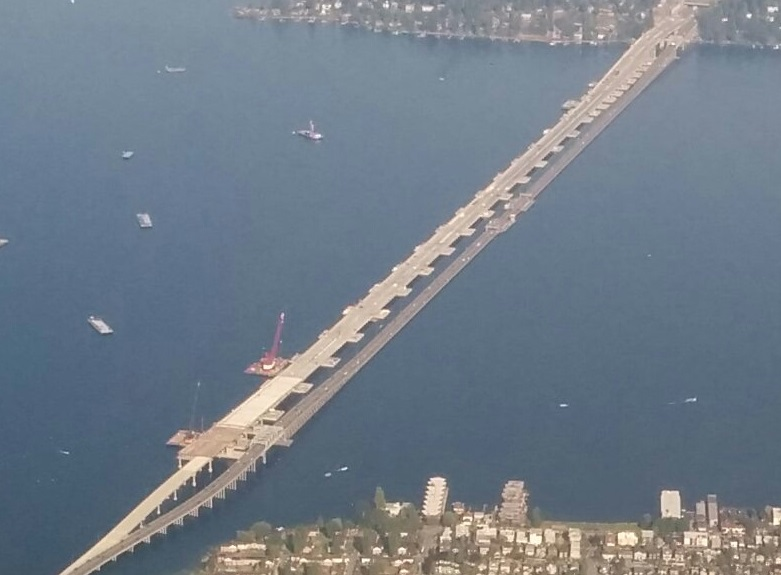
New (left) and old (right) bridges in 2015 showing difference in decks: old road surface is directly on pontoons laid end-to-end, but new road surface is raised above pontoons laid perpendicular to road.

The first stage of the SR 520 floating bridge replacement project was the construction of 77 concrete pontoons in 2011 and 2012 by Kiewit-General-Manson at two purpose-built facilities in Aberdeen and Tacoma. The pontoons were floated to the bridge on Lake Washington via the Lake Washington Ship Canal. Pontoon assembly and fastening, to form the floating bridge's deck, began in 2014 and concluded in July 2015.

In 2012, WSDOT identified cracks and other problems with the first batch of completed pontoons, estimating that it would cost $400 million to repair cracks and other flaws that would bring down the bridge's predicted lifespan below the desired 75 years. The problems were originally speculated to stem from shortcuts allegedly taken by the contractor to complete pontoons to meet set deadlines; the proposed solutions to fix the pontoons included adding high-tension steel cables and post-tensioning of the concrete. A state investigative report by concrete expert John Reilly blamed the WSDOT Bridge and Structures Office (BSO) for the error. The BSO did most of the pontoon design in-house, instead of delegating those details and the financial risk to contracting teams. The goal was to allow bids to be submitted sooner. The states top bridge engineer, Jugesh Kapur was ultimately let go over the error and another Department of Transportation employee was demoted. A floating, 660-short-ton (600 t) cofferdam was launched in November 2013 to assist in repairs of the pontoons, functioning as a portable drydock that wrapped around parts of the pontoons. The repairs were made by the contractor at the direction of WSDOT from December 2013 to June 2014 and cost a total of approximately $208 million, using up the majority of the program's reserve funds. As a result of the pontoon issues, the estimated opening of the bridge was pushed back from December 2014 into 2016.

Construction of the bridge deck, beginning with the eastern approach in Medina, began in March 2012. In March 2015, two construction accidents on the bridge slowed construction for reevaluation of safety measures: a contractor was killed after a high fall on the east highrise; and a crane-lifted load of steel pipes swung out of control into a King County Metro bus and an overhead highway sign.

The bridge deck was lifted into place in August 2015, and the final concrete pour was finished in October 2015, completing the bridge deck.

== Operational history ==
=== Opening and removal of old bridge ===
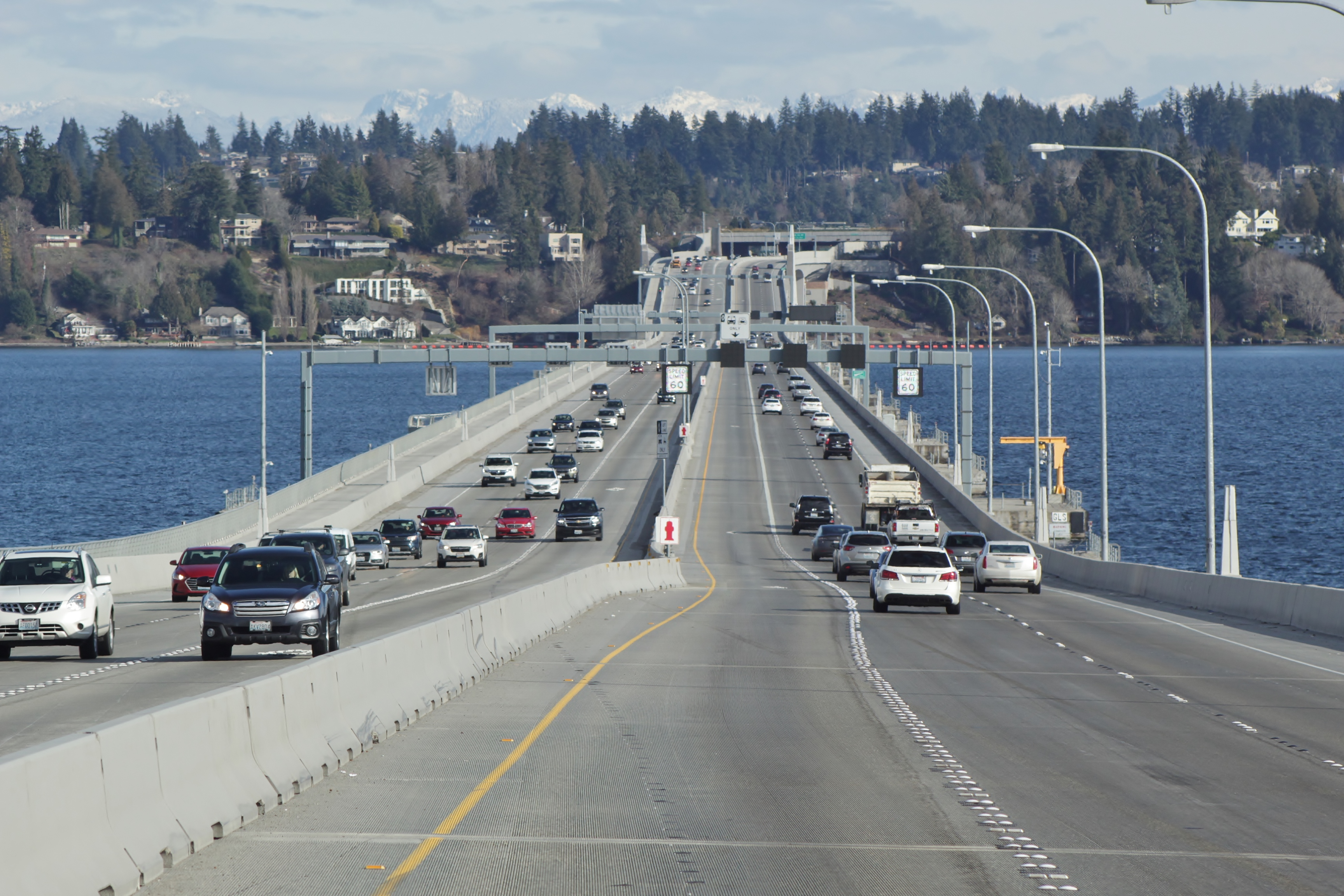
Eastbound view from the floating portion of the bridge

The new bridge was dedicated on April 2, 2016, in a ceremony presided over by Governor of Washington Jay Inslee and attended by an estimated 40,000 to 50,000 people. The ceremony also included a community fun run and walk on the bridge, and a bicycle ride hosted by the Cascade Bicycle Club on the bridge and the Interstate 5 express lanes the following day. As part of the opening ceremonies, the bridge was certified as the world's longest floating bridge by Guinness World Records, at 7,708.49 feet (2,349.55 m) long; the bridge took the record from the previous Evergreen Point Floating Bridge, which was 130 feet (40 m) shorter in length.

Traffic on the new bridge was shifted over in two stages, beginning with westbound traffic on April 11 and ending with eastbound traffic on April 25. Initially, the bridge narrowed from 6 lanes to 4 lanes at the end of the floating span, over 1.2 miles (1.9 km) east of the Montlake Boulevard interchange, and was not fully traversable for bicyclists and pedestrians. Shortly after the opening of the bridge's westbound lanes, the Washington State Transportation Commission proposed increasing toll rates to introduce nighttime tolling by 2017. The toll rate increase and nighttime toll was approved by the commission and implemented on July 1, 2017.

The old bridge was planned to be decommissioned by floating away pontoons to an industrial site in Kenmore for disposal and recycling; in March 2016, the city rejected the plan, citing the possible release of toxins in the pontoon's concrete. The pontoons were sold to a recycling company based in Gig Harbor which plans to reuse the individual pontoons for floating decks and other projects. An unaffiliated contest was held in 2012 seeking ideas for the 33 pontoons of the old bridge, with solutions ranging from a "floating High Line" to partial submersion for walking paths. The first pontoon of the old bridge to be disassembled was towed through the Lake Washington Ship Canal in July 2016. As of December 2020, several pontoons of the old bridge are anchored in the Pitt River in Pitt Meadows, British Columbia.

=== Approach bridge replacement ===
Construction of the 1.2-mile (1.9 km) western approach to the floating bridge, a conventional viaduct that crosses Union Bay, was split into three projects. A temporary bridge to connect the new floating bridge to the existing western approach was completed in September 2014. The north side of the new western approach, which would ultimately carry westbound traffic and the multi-use trail, began construction in October 2014. The project included removal of unused ramps over SR 520 that were built in the 1960s for the cancelled R.H. Thomson Expressway project; the ramps were demolished the following month, with the exception of a single set of four columns preserved for a future park, to make way for a work platform. The new approach bridge opened for westbound traffic in August 2017, with later revisions to extend the HOV lane towards the Montlake interchange. The bridge's multi-use bike and pedestrian path partially opened in July 2016, with access to the completed sections for an "out-and-back" experience; the trail was fully opened on December 20, 2017.

The original approach bridge continued to carry eastbound traffic until it was closed in November 2019 to prepare for construction of the south half of the new approach bridge. All four lanes of traffic between Montlake Boulevard and the floating bridge was directed onto the westbound approach bridge, which was narrowed and restriped for the multi-year construction period. A temporary onramp from Lake Washington Boulevard was opened a month later to replace the last of the unused Thomson Expressway ramps. Two mobile gantry cranes were used to disassemble and lift pieces of the old approach bridge beginning in 2020 after a construction delay due to the COVID-19 pandemic. The eastbound lanes on the approach bridge were opened to limited traffic in July 2023 and expanded to carry three lanes in its permanent configuration the following month. The remainder of the SR 520 megaproject, which includes replacement of the Portage Bay bridge and Montlake Boulevard interchange, is scheduled to be completed in 2031.

== Description ==
The new Evergreen Point Floating Bridge was designed to be more stable in stronger winds and raised the bridge deck much higher above the surface of the lake than the old bridge. Unlike the original floating bridge, where the road surface is directly on pontoons connected end-to-end, the new bridge featured pontoons laid north–south, perpendicular to the direction of vehicular traffic, and a road surface on a platform raised 20 feet (6.1 m) above the water. This design includes shoulders and a protected pedestrian and bicycle path across the viaduct.

=== Pontoons and anchors ===
The floating bridge is laid atop 77 concrete pontoons that float above the water and are secured by 58 anchors to the lake bottom.

Of the pontoons, 21 are longitudinal pontoons that support the deck and structure and are 360 by 75 by 28 feet (109.7 m × 22.9 m × 8.5 m) and weigh 11,000 short tons (10,000 t); 54 smaller supplemental pontoons, weighing 2,500 short tons (2,300 t), are used to stabilize the weight of the bridge; and two "cross" pontoons, weighing 10,100 short tons (9,200 t), are sited at each end of the floating span at transitional spans, which connect the deck to fixed bridges and approaches using hinges to move up to 24 inches (61 cm) for fluctuations in lake water levels moving the pontoons. All the pontoons are designed with watertight compartments that are monitored remotely with sensors to detect leaks that could lead to catastrophic failure.

The bridge's 58 anchors all feature 3-inch-thick (7.6 cm), 1,000-foot-long (300 m) steel cables and are divided into three types: 45 587-short-ton (533 t) fluke anchors used in softer soils deep in the lakebed; eight 107-short-ton (97 t) gravity anchors used in solid soils nearer to the shore; and five 10-foot-diameter (3.0 m), 79-to-92-foot-long (24 to 28 m) drilled shaft anchors used in conjunction with the gravity anchors to prevent navigation hazards.

To ensure storm resistance in the event of water seeping into the pontoons, each pontoon is outfitted with a leak detection system with a float switch that sits about 3 inches (7.6 cm) off the floor. If the pontoon is breached, an alarm will sound inside the maintenance building. From there, a pump can be lowered into the chamber and controlled from the deck above.

=== Bridge deck ===
The bridge deck is made of 776 precast concrete sections that are elevated 20 feet (6.1 m) above the concrete pontoons that forms the lower deck which essentially creates "a bridge on top of a bridge". Unlike the older bridge, maintenance vehicles can now access the pontoons from beneath the upper roadway deck without interrupting traffic. According to a project engineer on the site, the deck had to be structurally isolated from the main support structure using a damping system to ensure seismic resistance up to a magnitude 9 earthquake to comply with local building codes. The original deck design called for three support columns but was later revised to two due to aesthetic issues. Moreover, the lighting mounted on top of the deck had to be positioned to minimize light pollution as well as its effect on aquatic habitat.

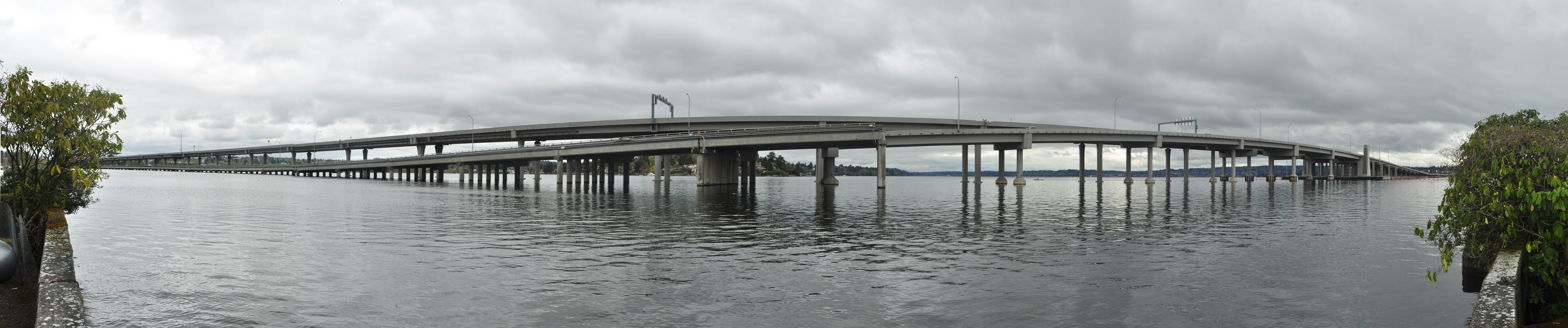
Panoramic view of the bridge looking north from Madison Park, Seattle. The western approach is split between the original low-level roadway for eastbound traffic and a high-level viaduct for westbound traffic, bicyclists, and pedestrians. The land straight ahead past the bridge is Laurelhurst.

=== Layout ===
The bridge has two general purpose lanes and one high-occupancy vehicle lane (HOV lane) per direction. It includes shoulders and a 14-foot-wide (4.3 m) pedestrian/bicycle path on the north side, unlike the 1963 bridge. Congestion on the old bridge was blamed on lack of shoulders, where disabled vehicles would cause severe backups. Ornamental elements include four sentinel towers rising 43 feet (13 m) above the bridge deck at the approaches, and belvederes on the north side.

=== Maintenance building ===
The bridge features advanced monitoring devices and new maintenance facilities. Beneath the bridge is a three-story high brick building used to control and monitor various life support and utility systems on the bridge. A backup generator sits on the ground level to power all systems in case of power loss. Behind the back wall of the building lies a massive retaining wall built in response to steep hills.

== Usage ==
In 2025, the floating bridge carried an annual average of 66,260 vehicles per weekday. Prior to the COVID-19 pandemic, the bridge carried a weekday average of 74,912 vehicles in 2018.

=== Public transportation ===
Public transportation and high-occupancy vehicle (HOV) use were incorporated in the bridge design. The bridge includes HOV lanes with priority for transit and the program as a whole built several transit-only facilities. A 2008 WSDOT report included five core bus rapid transit routes proposed by Sound Transit connecting the Eastside (Kirkland, Redmond, and Bellevue) to Downtown Seattle and the University District, with a base frequency of 15 minutes, increasing up to 7 minutes at peak times. The bus rapid transit program was not implemented and replaced by increased frequency on King County Metro and Sound Transit Express routes that serve the corridor. Existing freeway bus stations (also known as "flyer stops") on the Eastside at Evergreen Point and Yarrow Point were rebuilt and moved from the freeway's shoulder to the median, accompanied by landscaped lids with parking and lawns, in 2014 for increased compatibility with the bridge's planned HOV lanes.

The bridge was engineered to accommodate a Link light rail extension with two options (both requiring 30 additional pontoons): one option would be 116 feet (35 m) wide with two lanes each direction, plus light rail to replace the HOV lanes; the other 150-foot-wide (46 m) option would retain the HOV lanes, two general purpose lanes in each direction, and add light rail. A proposal to include a light rail line with the construction of the bridge was dropped in 2008 after Sound Transit chose to prioritize the East Link Extension on the I-90 floating bridge. A first line on the SR 520 corridor would also cause capacity issues on the section south of the Lake Washington Ship Canal.

== Tolling ==
Electronic tolling with the "Good to Go" system began on the old bridge in 2011; tolling on the new bridge was in place from its opening in 2016. The tolls are projected to generate $1.2 billion by 2056 to pay off bonds for the project as well as bridge operations and maintenance, debt service, future repairs, insurance, and deferred sales tax. The toll varies by time of day as well as day of week and applies in each direction. Rates are reviewed annually to cover all operational costs and debt service. Since August 2024, the rate for standard two axle passenger vehicles ranges from a minimum of $1.35 from 11 p.m. to 5 a.m. to a maximum of $4.90 during peak commuting hours on weekdays; an additional $2 is charged for toll paid via US mail. Major holidays are assessed at the weekend rate, which ranges from $1.35 overnight to $2.95 from 8 a.m. to 9 p.m. Vehicles with more than two axles are charged an additional rate.

In 2023, a total of 20.48 million toll transactions were recorded, of which the average rate paid was $3.37; approximately 85 percent of toll transactions were paid through the Good to Go system. A peak of 26.5 million transactions were reported in 2019 with an average revenue of $3.48.

== Reception ==
In April 2017, the bridge project was awarded the 2017 Grand Conceptor Award from the American Council of Engineering Companies (ACEC).

== See also ==
- Homer M. Hadley Memorial Bridge and Lacey V. Murrow Memorial Bridge, another pair of floating bridges over Lake Washington which connect Seattle to the Eastside via Interstate 90
- List of Seattle megaprojects
