= Naval Air Station Pasco =

- IATA: none; ICAO: none

Summary
- Airport type: Military
- Owner: United States Navy
- Location: Tri-Cities, Washington
- Elevation AMSL: 407 ft / 124.1 m
- Coordinates: 46°15′52.84″N 119°07′08.5″W
- Interactive map of Naval Air Station Pasco

Pasco Naval Air Station was a United States Navy air station located east of Pasco, in Franklin County, Washington, USA. After the war, it was redeveloped into Tri-Cities Airport. One of its auxiliary airfields became Vista Field in Kennewick, but was closed in 2013.

== History ==
After the Attack on Pearl Harbor, Naval reserve officers began searching through land surveys collected prior to WW2 to start assembling a response to the Japanese threat in the pacific.

The area selected for naval operations was a region of the windswept desert northeast of Pasco beside a railyard to accommodate easy transportation and shipment of men and material. Soon a group of Sea bees (CBs) who were nicknamed the "Dirty Thirty" begun construction on the runways in March 1942. Four months later the base was completed on August 3, where it also commenced its first flight hours.

The base was known at the time as "Navy Reserve Base," its primary mission was to provide its pilots with primary training using the Stearman Aircraft "kaydet" and to repair damaged aircraft from the pacific.

Later on in 1943, the mission directive shifted to also teach advanced training in the Grumman F6F Hellcat and Grumman TBF Avenger to pilots that deserve it. In the same year Naval Air Station Pasco earned its title of third busiest naval air station of the war thanks to its continuous use even during winter months due to the low levels of humidity.

In December 1942 Naval air station Pasco was the first naval base to receive a continent of WAVES, it is said that the air station's commanding officer B.B. Smith gave an order regarding the WAVES, "The women must stay out of the men's barracks, and the men must stay out of the women's barracks!".

Regarding the WAVES they were said to be treated fairly on base despite the societal norms of the time, they worked side-by-side with the men, not just excluded to clerical duties.

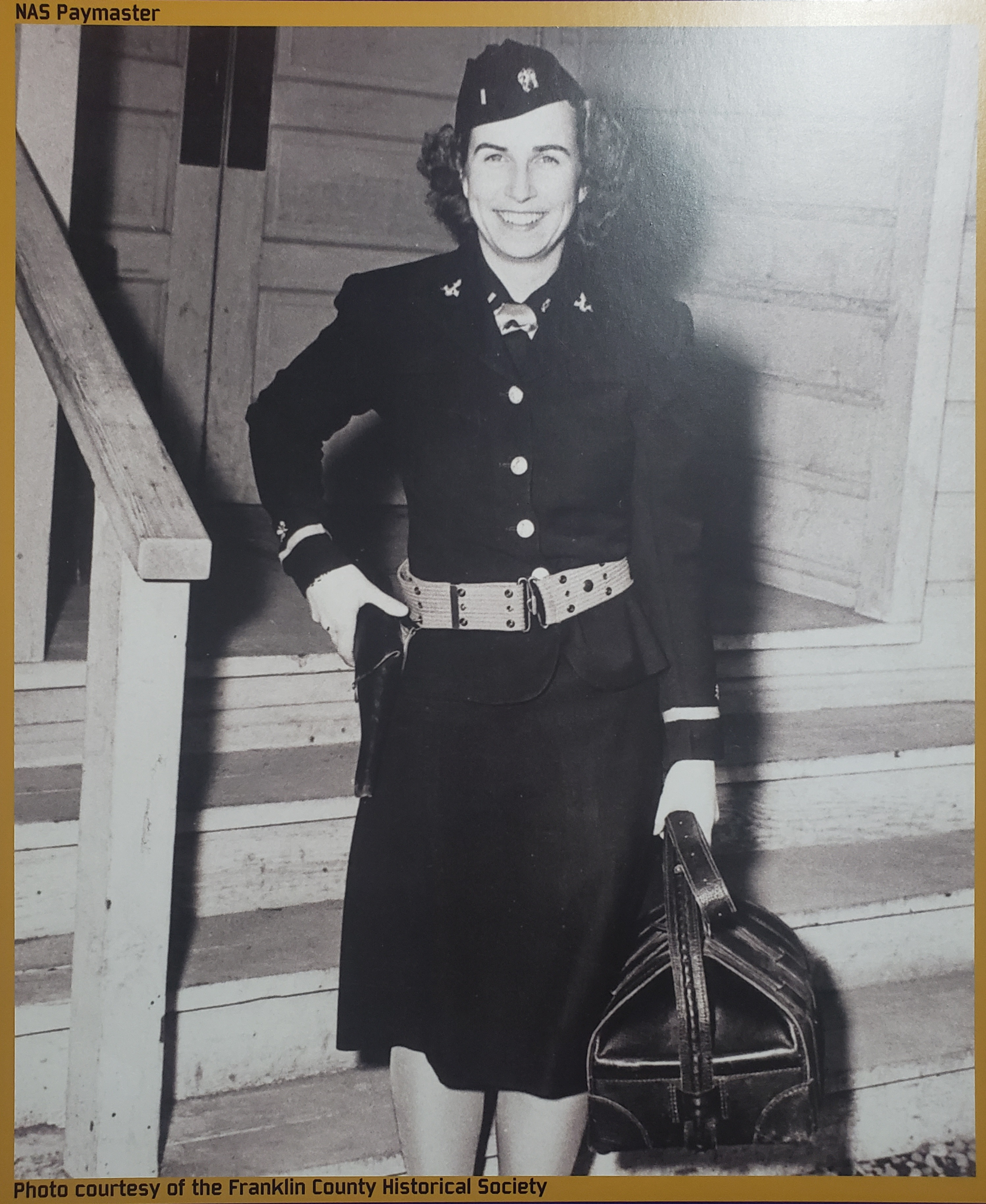
The paymaster of NAS Pasco was a WAVE, here she is seen with a duffel of paychecks and her sidearm.

Postwar, the Navy sold the entirety of the air station to the city of Pasco for a single dollar under the condition that it retains training privileges for its pilots. Several Navy aircraft, especially the P-3 Orion, still use the runways for touch and go's.

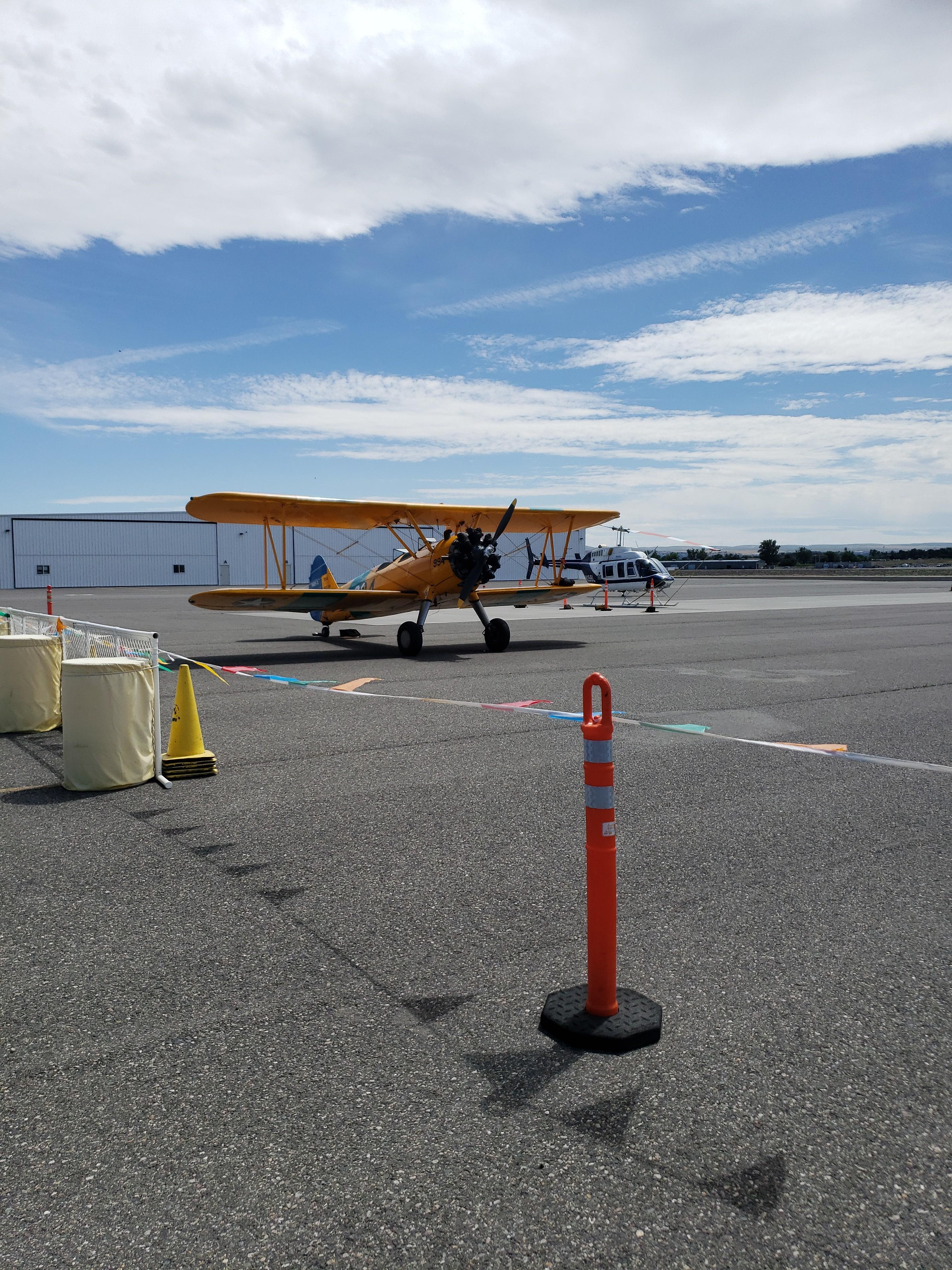
Pasco aviation museum owns a still flying Boeing Stearman biplane

On June 9, 2011, the Port of Pasco Commissioners agreed to preserve the old Navy-built control tower located on the East side of the Tri-Cities Airport, Pasco. A non-profit group has been formed to help the preservation and upkeep of the tower known as Pasco aviation museum. Today the control tower for the air station stands with most of its floors open to the public in the form of a museum.
