= List of Washington state bridge failures =

Washington is a state with many bodies of water to cross, including Puget Sound, Hood Canal, the Columbia River and numerous smaller rivers and creeks. It has experienced a number of bridge failures before and after the well known Tacoma Narrows Bridge collapse in 1940.

== Causes ==
The single greatest cause of failure in Washington has been flooding, frequently associated with severe storms, which then results in destructive bridge scour. According to University of Washington meteorologist Cliff Mass, Western Washington is "particularly vulnerable to such bridge losses, with long floating bridges and the powerful winds associated with our terrain and incoming Pacific cyclones."

Causes of failure, 1923–1998 (Note: Failures from Holstine and Hobbs analysis of 1923–1998 WSDOT data; excludes demolition, removal, replacement)
Cause	Number of failures
Flood	42
Fire	8
Volcanic mud and debris	5
Collision	4
Storm	3
Overload	3
Tsunami	2
Wind	1
Unknown	2

== List of bridge failures ==
Bridge failures 1905–2014 (Note: Bridge failure data from WSDOT 1905–2009 list unless noted.)
Bridge name	Year built	Date of destruction	Feature Crossed	Notes
I-5 Skagit River Bridge	1955	May 23, 2013	Skagit River	Cause: Collision—Truck struck arch with fracture critical design, causing structural failure
Dry Creek Bridge	Unknown	Aug 21, 2009	Dry Creek	
Omak Bridge	1911	1911	Okanogan River	Steel swing bridge collapsed when first tested.
Fourth Avenue Bridge (Olympia)	1905	Mar 15, 1915	Budd Inlet (Puget Sound)	Cause: Collapse of drawbridge following sinking of piers
Fourth Avenue Bridge (Olympia)	1919	Sep 11, 2001	Budd Inlet (Puget Sound)	Cause: Earthquake—2001 Nisqually earthquake
Nolan Creek Bridge	1931	Dec 15, 1999	Nolan Creek	
Carbon River Bridge	1921	Mar 4, 1998	Carbon River	Cause: Fire—Wooden deck and wooden approach arch burned following vehicle collision (Note: Deck rebuilt over existing steel arch)
Naches River Bridge	1938	Feb 9, 1996	Naches River	
Lacey V. Murrow Memorial Bridge	1940	Nov 25, 1990	Lake Washington	Cause: Storm—Severe windstorm and human error caused flooding of pontoons
Carbon River Bridge	1971	Nov 24, 1990	Carbon River	
Nooksack River - Nugents Bridge	1946	Nov 10, 1989	Nooksack River	Cause: flooding
Skokomish River Bridge	1927	Oct 4, 1984	Skokomish River	
North Fork Toutle River-Coalbanks	1972	May 18, 1980	N. Fork Toutle River	Cause: Flood—Mud and debris following 1980 eruption of Mount St. Helens (Note: Some sources say a total of 27 bridges had to be replaced)
Alder Creek Bridge	1954	May 18, 1980	Alder Creek	Cause: Flood—Mud and debris following 1980 eruption of Mount St. Helens
St. Helens Bridge	1949	May 18, 1980	Toutle River	Cause: Flood—Mud and debris following 1980 eruption of Mount St. Helens
Coldwater Creek Bridge	1933	May 18, 1980	Coldwater Creek	Cause: Flood—Mud and debris following 1980 eruption of Mount St. Helens
North Fork Toutle River Bridge	1938	May 18, 1980	N. Fork Toutle River	Cause: Flood—Mud and debris following 1980 eruption of Mount St. Helens
Russell Barker Memorial Bridge	1925	Dec 14, 1979	Bogachiel River	
Teanaway River Bridge	1922	Nov 28, 1979	Teanaway River Bridge	
Little Naches River Bridge	1928	Aug 20, 1979	Little Naches River	
Hood Canal Bridge	1961	Feb 13, 1979	Hood Canal	Cause: Storm—February 13, 1979 windstorm
Johnson Creek Bridge	19	Oct 1, 1978	Johnson Creek	
Goat Creek Bridge	1922	Dec 3, 1977	Goat Creek	
Bear Canyon	1936	Dec 2, 1977	Bear Creek	
Creek	Unknown	Dec 2, 1977	Creek	
Satus Creek Bridge	1959	Jan 19, 1974	Satus Creek	Cause: Flood—Floodwaters from January 17 event broke through ice jam on January 19. U.S. Highway 97 and many county roads cut; White Swan unreachable by road; entire county declared Federal disaster area.
Satus Creek Third Crossing	1942	Jan 19, 1974	Satus Creek	Cause: Flood—Floodwaters from January 17 event broke through ice jam on January 19. U.S. Highway 97 and many county roads cut; White Swan unreachable by road; entire county declared Federal disaster area.
Satus Creek Fourth Crossing	1942	Jan 19, 1974	Satus Creek	Cause: Flood—Floodwaters from January 17 event broke through ice jam on January 19. U.S. Highway 97 and many county roads cut; White Swan unreachable by road; entire county declared Federal disaster area.
Satus Creek First Crossing	1942	Jan 19, 1974	Satus Creek	Cause: Flood—Floodwaters from January 17 event broke through ice jam on January 19. U.S. Highway 97 and many county roads cut; White Swan unreachable by road; entire county declared Federal disaster area.
Klickitat River Bridge	1954	Jan 19, 1974	Klickitat River	
Coal Creek Bridge	1945	Feb 4, 1971	Coal Creek	
Dry Creek Bridge	Unknown	Jan 1, 1971	Dry Creek	
Columbia River Bridge, Brewster	1927	Aug 5, 1968	Columbia River	Cause: Fire—Welding torch ignited wood deck, heat weakened steel, causing structural failure
Cowlitz River - Nesika	Unknown	Nov 1, 1967	Cowlitz River	
Lake Creek	1950	Nov 15, 1966	Lake Creek	
Scatter Creek Bridge	1932	Jan 29, 1965	Scatter Creek	
Smith Creek Bridge	Unknown	June 1, 1964	Smith Creek	
Copalis River Bridge	1952	Mar 27, 1964	Copalis River	
Joe Creek Bridge	1953	Mar 27, 1964	Joe Creek	
Chow Chow Bridge	1952	1964, 1973, 1988	Quinault River	Collapsed three times. Was an early cable-stayed bridge design on the Quinault Indian Reservation near Taholah, one of the first cable-stayed bridges in the U.S. Timbers made into cedar shakes for tribal center in Taholah after 1988 collapse.
Rocky Creek Bridge	1947	Nov 19, 1962	Rocky Creek	
Gallup Creek Bridge	1956	Nov 19, 1962	Gallup Creek	
Peshastin Creek	1923	Nov 20, 1959	Peshastin Creek	
Salmon Creek Bridge	1927	Jan 5, 1956	Salmon Creek	Cause: Bridge scour—Floating tree lodged under pier. Bridge collapsed 13 days after U.S. Highway 99 was opened.
South Prarrie Creek Bridge	1941	Dec 11, 1955	South Prarrie Creek	
Snake River at Burbank	1920	Sep 9, 1949	Snake River	
Salmon Creek Bridge	1927	Feb 23, 1949	Salmon Creek	
Robinson Creek Br.	Unknown	June 14, 1948	Robinson Creek	Cause: Flooding (Note: Holstine and Hobbs say 7 bridges lost, this apparently does not count losses on minor tributaries of the Methow.)
Lost River Bridge	Unknown	June 14, 1948	Lost River	Cause: Flooding
Methow River Bridge	1918	June 14, 1948	Methow River	Cause: Flooding
Little Boulder Creek Bridge	Unknown	June 14, 1948	Little Boulder Creek	Cause: Flooding
Chewuck River Bridge	Unknown	June 14, 1948	Chewuck River	Cause: Flooding
Methow River at Winthrop	1933	June 14, 1948	Methow River	Cause: Flooding
Methow River Bridge at Twisp	1931	June 14, 1948	Methow River	Cause: Flooding
Methow River Bridge	1939	June 14, 1948	Methow River	Cause: Flooding
Methow River Bridge	1939	June 14, 1948	Methow River	Cause: Flooding
Methow River Bridge	1933	June 14, 1948	Methow River	Cause: Flooding
Pine Creek Bridge	1918	June 1, 1948	Pine Creek	
Cle Elum River Bridge	1929	May 31, 1948	Cle Elum River	
Centralia Power Canal Bridge	1936	Sep 24, 1947	Centralia Power Canal	
Hoko River Bridge	Unknown	April 22, 1947	Hoko River	Cause: Overloading—20-ton fully loaded logging truck attempted to cross 5-ton rated bridge.
Washougal River Bridge	1926	Feb 6, 1947	Washougal River	Cause: Fire—Fuel tanker truck collision weakened steel, followed by structural failure
Mashel River Bridge	1916	Dec 11, 1946	Mashel River	
St. Helens Bridge	Unknown	Dec 11, 1946	Toutle River	
Rocky Creek Bridge	1929	Oct 25, 1945	Rocky Creek	
Gallup Creek Bridge	Unknown	Oct 25, 1945	Gallup Creek	
Cora Bridge	1925	Nov 12, 1943	Cowlitz River	
Razorhone Creek (Lower)	Unknown	June 26, 1943	Razorhone Creek	
Razorhone Creek (Upper)	Unknown	June 26, 1943	Razorhone Creek	
Adna Bridge	1932	May 1, 1943	Chehalis River	
Lindberg Over Crossing	1933	Mar 2, 1943	C.M.St.R.&P. Rail Road.	
Long Lake Bridge	1911	Sep 26, 1942	Spokane River	Cause: Vibration—Sheep herd crossing bridge
Tacoma Narrows Bridge	1940	Nov 7, 1940	Tacoma Narrows (Puget Sound)	Cause: Wind/Design flaw—Aeroelastic fluttering (wind dynamics) leading to structural failure
Detillion Bridge	Unknown	May 24, 1939	Spokane River	Cause: Collision—Tractor-trailer collision on deck
Allen Street Bridge also called Kelso-Longview Bridge	1906	Jan 3, 1923	Cowlitz River	Cause: Some combination of storm, collision, overloading. Deadliest Washington bridge disaster with at least 17 deaths.
Wenatchee Avenue Bridge	c. 1894	July 4, 1917	Wenatchee River	Cause: Fire—Independence Day celebratory fireworks burned wooden deck (Note: Rebuilt over existing steel structure)
Division Street Bridge	1892	Dec 18, 1915	Spokane River	Cause: Collision or metal fatigue (Note: Floods in 1894 carried part of an upstream railroad bridge into the Division Street bridge in 1894; metal fatigue, shoddy steel, and a design flaw were also cited by contemporary sources)
Columbia River Bridge, Brewster	1927	May 2, 1905	Columbia River	
Snoqualmie River Bridge	1931	April 17, 1905	Snoqualmie River	

== See also ==
- List of bridge failures
