= Conconully Dam =

Dam in Washington, United States

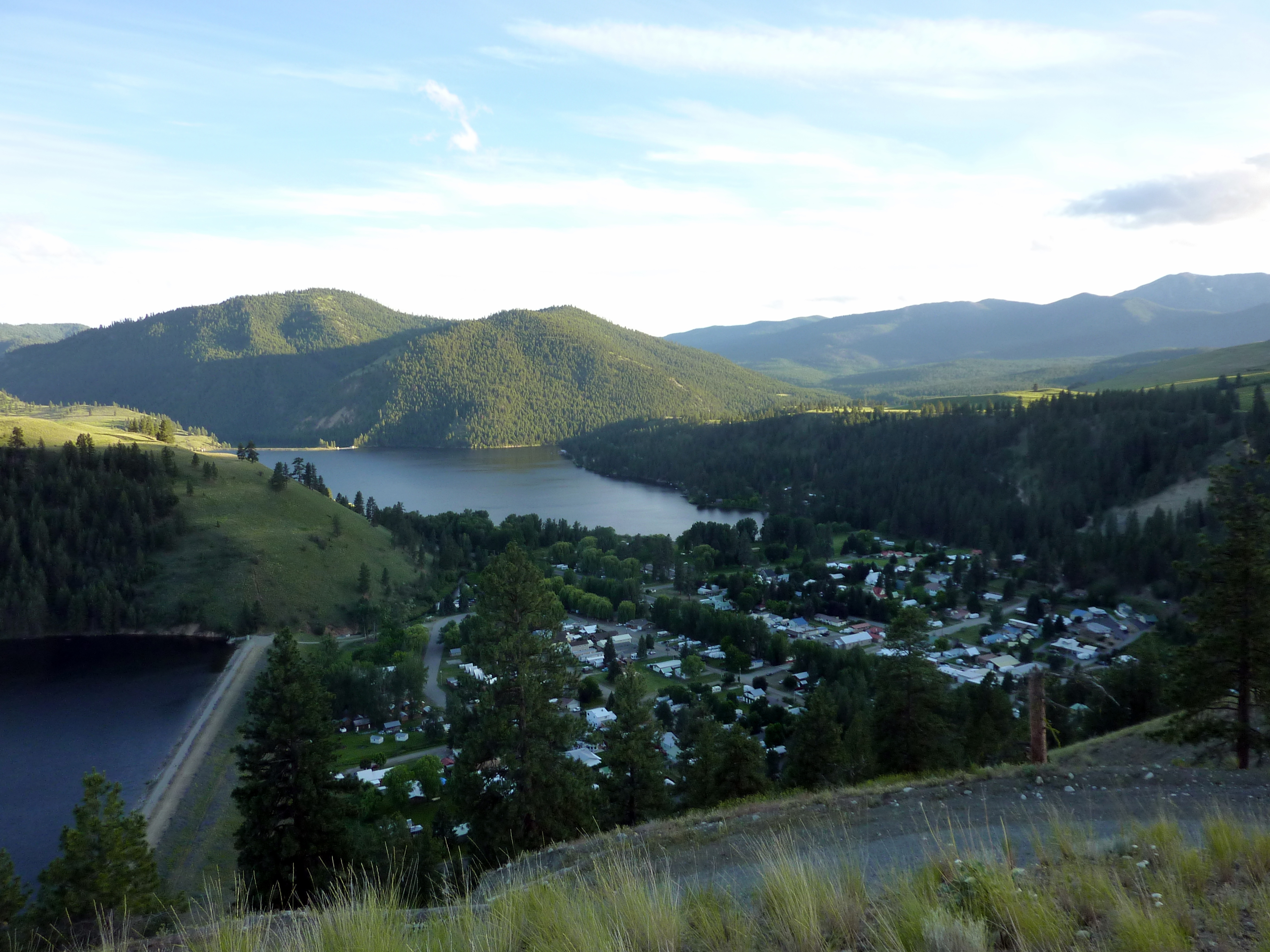
- the town of Conconully from the north, with the Conconully Lake and the 1921 Salmon Lake Dam to the east (left), and Conconully Reservoir to the south
- Interactive map of Conconully Dam
- Country: United States
- Coordinates: 48°32′17″N 119°44′56″W
- Status: Operational
- Construction began: 1910, 1920, 1969
- Opening date: 1911
- Built by: United States Bureau of Reclamation
- Owner: United States Bureau of Reclamation
- Operator: Okanogan Irrigation District

Dam and spillways
- Impounds: Salmon Creek
- Height: 72 ft (22 m)
- Length: 1,075 ft (328 m)

Reservoir
- Total capacity: 13,000 acre⋅ft (16,000,000 m^{3})
- Surface area: 550 acres (220 ha)
- Normal elevation: 2,287 ft (697 m)

Conconully Dam (National ID # WA00259) is a dam in Okanogan County, Washington, United States.

The earthen dam was initially constructed at a height of 70 feet (21 m) in 1910 and 1911 by the United States Bureau of Reclamation, during the first generation of the Bureau's activity, then raised in 1920 and reconstructed in 1969. The dam's current height is 72 feet (22 m) and it is 1,075 feet (328 m) long at its crest.

Conconully Dam impounds Salmon Creek for flood control and irrigation storage, part of the larger Okanogan Project. It was listed on the National Register of Historic Places on September 6, 1974. The adjacent 1921 Salmon Lake Dam and its reservoir, Conconully Lake, are also part of the same project. Both are owned by the Bureau and operated by the local Okanogan Irrigation District.

The Conconully Reservoir has a normal water surface area of 550 acres (220 ha) and a maximum storage capacity of 13,000 acre-feet (16,000,000 m^{3}). Recreation includes fishing (for rainbow trout, cutthroat trout and smallmouth bass), boating, camping, hiking and wildlife viewing. Conconully State Park and Conconully National Wildlife Refuge are also nearby.

== History ==
The construction of the dam was interrupted by a strike in July 1909. The construction workers were offered a twenty-five cent per day pay increase but demanded fifty cents. Notice of the strike was published in the Industrial Worker, a weekly newspaper of the Industrial Workers of the World published out of Spokane.
