= List of tunnels in Seattle =

This is a list of tunnels built in the city of Seattle, in the U.S. state of Washington.

The Puget Sound region, where Seattle lies, has a history of glaciation that has left many hills and ridges that civil engineers have needed to traverse for transportation and utilities. Some of these tunnels are part of megaprojects.

== Tunnels ==
Year(s) Constructed	Tunnel	Diameter	Length	Notes	References
1894	Lake Union Sewer Tunnel	72 in (1.8 m)	5,736 ft (1,748 m)	Hand excavated	
1894	South Bayview Street Tunnel	4 ft (1.2 m) x 6 ft (1.8 m)	4,526 ft (1,380 m)	Hand excavated	
1903–1905	Great Northern Tunnel	38 ft (12 m)	5,141 ft (1,567 m)	Hand excavated	
1907	Oregon and Washington Railroad Tunnel	38 ft (12 m)	900 ft (270 m)	Hand excavated; never completed (filled in 1922)	
1910	First Avenue Utilidor Tunnel	8 ft (2.4 m)	300 ft (91 m)	Compressed air, hand	
1910	4th and Connecticut Ave. Sewer	3–6 ft (0.91–1.83 m)	7,060 ft (2,150 m)	Supported trench	
1910	Ravenna Sewer Tunnel	80 in (2.0 m); Relined 66 in (1.7 m)	2,875 ft (876 m)	Hand; tried tunnel boring machine	
Early 1900s	Wallingford Tunnel	9 ft (2.7 m)	1,803 ft (550 m)	Open cut and tunnel	
Early 1900s	Pacific Street Tunnel	9 ft (2.7 m)	11,325 ft (3,452 m)	Open cut and tunnel	
1910	Lander Street Sewer	4.5–9 ft (1.4–2.7 m)	5,290 ft (1,610 m)	Supported trench	
1911	Fort Lawton Tunnel	10 ft (3.0 m)	9,720 ft (2,960 m)	Hand dug	
1911	Montlake Siphon Tunnel	4 ft (1.2 m)	2,005 ft (611 m)	Hand dug	
1912	Dexter and 8th Avenue Tunnel	5 ft (1.5 m)	9,315 ft (2,839 m)	Hand dug	
1912	Washington Park Tunnels	5 ft (1.5 m)	4,052 ft (1,235 m)	Hand dug	
1913	Third Avenue West Siphon Tunnel	21 ft (6.4 m)	500 ft (150 m)	Hand dug	
1926	Jackson Street Drainage Tunnel	4 ft × 6 ft (1.2 m × 1.8 m)	1,500 feet (460 m)	Hand dug 35 psi compressed air	
1930	South Hanford Street Tunnel	9 ft (2.7 m)	6,055 ft (1,846 m)	Hand dug	
1931	Charleston Street Tunnel	3.5 ft (1.1 m)	2,830 ft (860 m)		
1936	Henderson Trunk Sewer Tunnel	60 in (1.5 m) (I.D., concrete); 48 in (1.2 m) (brick)	3,000 ft (910 m)	Hand dug Concrete and brick	
1936	Laurelhurst Trunk Sewer Tunnel	9 ft (2.7 m)	1,850 ft (560 m)		
1938–1941	Mount Baker Tunnel	28 ft × 23 ft (8.5 m × 7.0 m)	1,330 ft (410 m)		
1934–1942	WPA slide control drainage projects	4 ft × 6 ft (1.2 m × 1.8 m)	4,926 ft (1,501 m)		
1952–1954	Battery Street Tunnel		3,140 ft (960 m)	Originally named Battery Street Subway	
1963	Montlake Siphon Tunnel replacements	42 in × 108 in (1.1 m × 2.7 m)	586 ft (179 m)		
1965–1966	Elliott Bay Interceptor section 6 tunnel	8 ft × 12.5 ft (2.4 m × 3.8 m)	1,750 feet (530 m)	Tunnelling shield	
1964–1967	Lake City Sewer Tunnel	8 ft × 11 ft (2.4 m × 3.4 m)	17,570 feet (5,360 m)	Close-face wheel excavator	
1967–1968	Second Avenue Sewer Tunnel	8.5 ft × 12.5 ft (2.6 m × 3.8 m)	19,900 feet (6,100 m)	Tunnelling shield	
1960s to present	University of Washington utilidors	Various, 5–10 ft (1.5–3.0 m)	50,000 feet (15,000 m) total		
1975	Northwest Kidney Center pedestrian tunnel	10 ft (3.0 m) horseshoe	120 ft (37 m)	Bobcat loader	
1983–1986	Mount Baker Tunnel expansion	65 ft (20 m)	1,330 ft (410 m)	Tunnelling shield World's largest diameter soil tunnel	
1984	Seattle Public Utilities Beacon Hill Waterline/Cedar River Pipeline	12 ft (3.7 m)	150 ft (46 m)		
1985	Columbia Center pedestrian tunnel	14 ft (4.3 m) horseshoe	280 ft (85 m)		
1985	Virginia Mason Hospital pedestrian tunnel	10 ft (3.0 m) horseshoe	120 ft (37 m)	Bobcat loader	
1986	Renton Sewer Tunnel ETS-4A	12 ft (3.7 m) O.D.	2,403 ft (732 m)	Drill and shoot	
1986	Renton Sewer Tunnel ETS-4B	12 ft (3.7 m) O.D.	620 ft (190 m)	Drill and shoot	
1986	Renton Sewer Tunnel ETS-5	12 ft (3.7 m) O.D.	1,820 ft (550 m)	Drill and shoot	
1986	Renton Sewer Tunnel ETS-6	12 ft (3.7 m) O.D.	1,056 ft (322 m)	First use of Earth Pressure Balance Machine in Seattle	
1987–1988	Downtown Seattle Transit Tunnel	Twin 21.25 ft (6.48 m)	13,624 ft (4,153 m)	Tunnelling shield First use of waterproofing PVC membrane in USA	
1990	Fort Lawton Tunnel/West Point Sewer	15.5 ft (4.7 m) O.D.	8,400 feet (2,600 m)	Partial Earth Pressure Balance Machine	
1993	Royal Brougham Street Sewer Tunnel	10 ft (3.0 m) O.D.	300 ft (91 m)		
1993	Lake Washington Canal Tunnel	3.3 ft (1.0 m)	1,518 ft (463 m)	First slurry microtunnel in Seattle	
1995	Lander Street Sewer Tunnel	10 ft (3.0 m) O.D.	130 ft (40 m)		
1995	First Avenue Utilidor Tunnel	10 ft (3.0 m)	500 ft (150 m)	Microtunnel	
1995–1997	West Seattle Sewer Tunnel	13 ft (4.0 m)	10,500 feet (3,200 m)	Partial Earth Pressure Balance Machine; Maximum 400 feet (120 m) below surface	
1997	Eastlake Storm Sewer Tunnel	3.5 ft (1.1 m)	475 ft (145 m)	Slurry microtunnel	
2001	Justice Center Tunnel	15 ft (4.6 m) horseshoe	200 ft (61 m)		
2002	Denny CSO Storage Tunnel	16.8 ft (5.1 m) O.D.	6,212 ft (1,893 m)	First complete Earth Pressure Balance Machine tunnel in Seattle	
2002	Henderson CSO Storage Tunnel	16.8 ft (5.1 m) O.D.	3,105 ft (946 m)	Earth Pressure Balance Machine, connecting microtunnels	
2006	Beacon Hill tunnel	Twin 20 ft (6.1 m)	1 mi (1.6 km)	Tunnel boring machine	
2009–2012	University Link Tunnel	Twin 20 ft (6.1 m)	3 mi (4.8 km)	Tunnel boring machine $1.9 billion megaproject	
2007–2011	Brightwater Sewage Tunnel	17.5 ft (5.3 m)	13 mi (21 km)	Four tunnel boring machines Maximum depth 400 feet (120 m); Part of $1.8 billion megaproject	
2013–2018	Alaskan Way Viaduct replacement tunnel	57 feet (17 m)	2 mi (3.2 km)	$4.25 billion megaproject World's largest tunnel boring machine, 57.5 feet (17.5 m) in diameter	
2014–2016	Northgate Link tunnel	Twin 20 ft (6.1 m)	3.4 mi (5.5 km)	Tunnel boring machine $2.1 billion megaproject	
2019–	King County Ship Canal Water Quality Project	21.67 ft (6.61 m) and 8 ft (2.4 m)	2.7 mi (4.3 km)	Largest tunnel boring machine named "Mudhoney" to construct combined sewer outflow storage tunnel under EPA consent decree. Two smaller machines for conveyance tunnels.	

== See also ==
- List of tunnels in the United States
