= Hanford Tank Waste Treatment and Immobilization Plant =

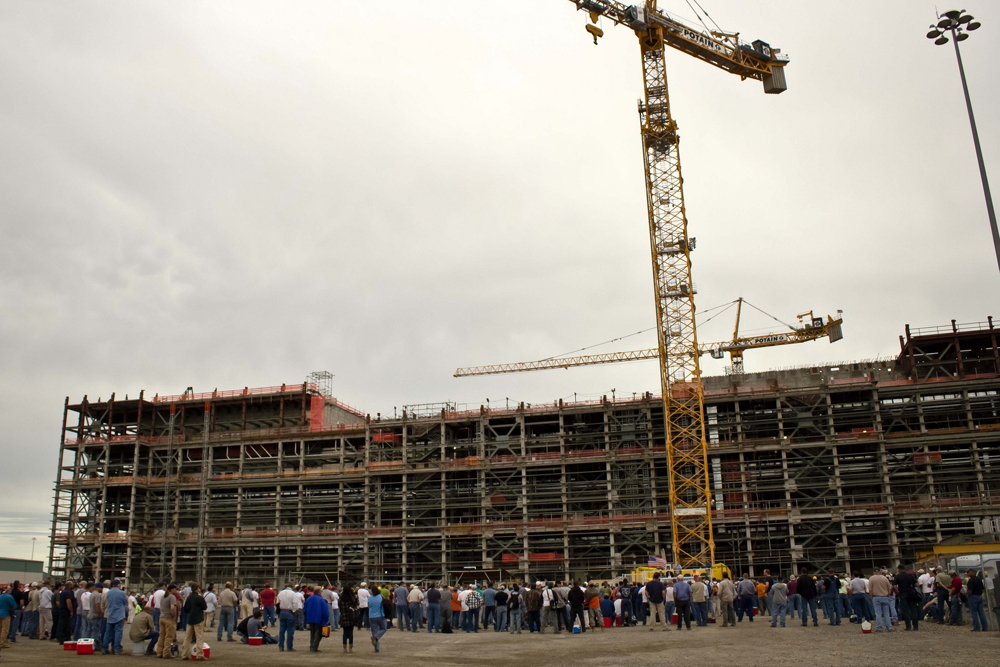
Hanford Tank Waste Treatment and Immobilization Plant in 2012

The Hanford Tank Waste Treatment and Immobilization Plant, known as the Vit Plant, will process the nuclear waste at the Hanford Site in Washington into a solid glass form using vitrification. A proven technology that has been used at the Savannah River Site and West Valley Demonstration Project, vitrification involves mixing the waste with glass-forming chemicals, heating it to 2,100 degrees Fahrenheit (1,149 degrees Celsius), and pouring it into stainless steel containers to solidify.

The Vit Plant will first process Hanford's low-activity waste liquids, starting as soon as 2023, as part of the Department of Energy's Direct-Feed Low-Activity Waste (DFLAW) approach. Under DFLAW, waste will be sent from the tank farms to the Vit Plant's Low-Activity Waste Facility for vitrification. High-level waste will be processed and vitrified later in a separate process.

The Hanford Site is currently storing 56 million gallons of radioactive waste in aging underground tanks, legacy waste from plutonium production efforts during World War II and the Cold War. The majority of the waste in the tanks is low-activity waste liquids.

Prime contractor Bechtel National, Inc., is designing, building, and commissioning the plant with subcontractor AECOM for the U.S. Department of Energy.

According to a 2012 Government Accountability Office report, several technical challenges remained, including how to keep radioactive waste from incurring a criticality accident and exploding before it was vitrified. As of 2017, the project was undergoing "ongoing" reviews by the Government Accounting Office, Office of Inspector General, Defense Nuclear Facilities Safety Board and other agencies, with a re-baselined projected cost of $16.813 billion and completion date in 2023. In 2019, the Defense Nuclear Facility Safety Board concurred with the Department of Energy that the technical challenges had been resolved.

== Location ==
The plant is in Hanford Site's 200 area (46°33′N 119°30′W).
