= Vista Field =

- IATA: ~~VSK~~; ICAO: none; FAA LID: ~~S98~~

Summary
- Airport type: Public
- Owner: Port of Kennewick
- Serves: Kennewick, Washington
- Location: Benton County, Washington, U.S.
- Elevation AMSL: 534 ft / 163 m
- Coordinates: 46.22°N 119.21°W
- Interactive map of Vista Field

Runways
Direction	Length		Surface
Direction	ft	m	Surface
2/20	4,008	1,222	Asphalt

Statistics (2007)
- Aircraft operations: 45,000
- Based aircraft: 35
- Source: Federal Aviation Administration

Vista Field (IATA: VSK, FAA LID: S98) was a public use airport in Benton County, Washington, United States. The airport was located three nautical miles (6 km) northwest of the central business district of Kennewick and was owned by the Port of Kennewick. It was also known as Vista Field Airport.

Several shipping carriers operated out of the airport. There had been controversy in recent years over whether or not to continue to operate the airport or to shut it down; it was officially closed on December 31, 2013, due to operating costs. The Port of Kennewick plans to redevelop the 103-acre (42 ha) site into a mixed-use residential and commercial neighborhood with parks and plazas. Several streets were laid in the early 2020s ahead of property sales for development.

During World War II in the 1940s, it was an auxiliary field for nearby Naval Air Station Pasco, training naval aviators. The Port of Kennewick acquired the airport in 1991.

The Toyota Center arena, opened in 1988 as the Tri-Cities Coliseum, is adjacent to the northwest.

== Facilities and aircraft ==
Vista Field covered an area of 100 acres (40 ha) at an elevation of 534 feet (163 m) above mean sea level. It had one asphalt paved runway designated 2/20 which measured 4,008 feet (1,222 m), with a width of 150 feet (46 m).

It formerly had a T-configuration, with a perpendicular runway of 3,500 feet (1,070 m) to the northwest.

For the 12-month period ending June 30, 2007, the airport had 45,000 general aviation aircraft operations, an average of 123 per day. At that time there were 35 aircraft based at this airport: 86% single-engine, 11% multi-engine and 3% helicopter.

== See also ==
- List of airports in Washington
