= Rain attenuation frequency scaling =

In communications satellite systems, rain attenuation frequency scaling is a technique implemented to model rain fade phenomena affecting a telecommunications link, both statistically and instantaneously. Accurate predictions of rain attenuation are crucial both for the proper design of a satellite communication (SatCom) system, as the detrimental impact of hydrometeors present within the troposphere, mainly rain, on radio frequency signals, can lead to system failures (commonly known as network outage periods). Moreover, such analyses are essential for the implementation of adaptive fade mitigation techniques, such as uplink power control and variable rate encoding schemes, to increase the link availability.

A scaling approach is particularly suitable in scenarios where the uplink and downlink, which typically share the same channel capacity and therefore operate at different frequency to avoid co-channel interference, are affected by the same rainfall event along the link. In such context, it may be advantageous to derive the attenuation due to rain at the higher frequency, called target frequency, by properly scaling concurrent attenuation measurements affecting the same link at lower frequency, called reference frequency.

Furthermore, as rain attenuation measurements inherently embed key information about the rain event, such as the spatial distribution of the rain and the information on the raindrop size distribution (DSD), frequency scaling models provide an enhanced prediction accuracy if compared to statistical prediction models, which are typically fed with local pointfall rain data only. As proof, frequency scaling models applied to experimental SatCom systems operating within the geostationary orbit yield statistical errors of 12 - 15% in contrast to the 30 - 40% associated with statistical prediction models.

== General definition ==
Conceptually, the frequency scaling (FS) of rain attenuation, ${A}_{R}$, can be expressed as:

$\tilde{A}_{R,f_{U}} = R_{FS} \ A_{R,f_{L}} \quad\textrm{(dB)}$

where the estimation of the rain attenuation at the target frequency $f_{U}$, namely $\tilde{A}_{R,f_{U}}$, is directly related to the corresponding attenuation measured at the reference frequency $f_{L}$ (Hz), namely ${A}_{R,f_{L}}$ (dB), by means of the frequency scaling ratio, $R_{FS}$, whose definition changes model by model.

Several FS models have been proposed in the past, and they can be classified as either statistical (S-FS) models or instantaneous (I-FS) models. S-FS are typically empirically based and relate the attenuation values at $f_{L}$ and $f_{U}$ as function of the same frequency of exceedance, commonly referred to as the exceedance probability level $p$%:

$\tilde{A}_{R,f_{U}}(p) = R_{FS} \ A_{R,f_{L}}(p) \quad\textrm{(dB)}$

In this context, $R_{FS}$ is typically a constant only dependent only on the two operating frequencies. However, defining a fixed $R_{FS}$ limits the scaling prediction accuracy, as the value of $R_{FS}$ can vary significantly from one rain event to another, and even within the same event. I-FS models aim at overcoming this limitation by introducing a time-variant $R_{FS}(t)$:

$\tilde{A}_{R,f_{U}}(t) = R_{FS}(t) \ A_{R,f_{L}}(t) \quad\textrm{(dB)}$

In addition to enhanced accuracy, I-FS models are fundamental for assessing the dynamics of rain attenuation along an Earth-space link. This is crucial for investigating, for example, fade slope (i.e., the rate of change with time for rain attenuation) and fade duration (i.e., the duration for a given rain attenuation threshold) statistics.

== Statistical frequency scaling models ==
Several long-term S-FS models have been proposed in the past to extrapolate attenuation induced by rain from one frequency to another. One of the most straightforward S-FS approaches is based on the following power law:

$R_{FS}^{POW} = \left( \frac{f_{U}}{f_{L}} \right)^n \quad n>0$,

where $f_{L}$ and $f_{U}$ represent the lower and upper operating frequencies, respectively. Various values for the power n have been proposed:

- $n=1.8$ by Dintelmann
- $n=2$ by Owolabi and Ajayi
- $n=1.72$ by Drufuca.

The model recommended by the International Radio Consultative Committee (CCIR), now ITU-R, is defined by a fixed $R_{FS}$ based on a formula of the type:

$R_{FS}^{CCIR} = \frac{g(f_{U})}{g(f_{L})}$,

where $g(f)$ is a function defined as:

$g(f)=\frac{f^{1.72}}{1+3\cdot 10^{-7} f^{3.44}}$.

Boithias's model is fed by the base attenuation $A_{L}$ (dB) and the operating frequencies:

$R_{FS}^{B} = \left( \frac{\phi_{U}}{\phi_{L}} \right) ^{1-H(\phi_{L},\phi_{U},A_{L})}$,

where

$\phi(f) = \frac{f^2}{1+10^{-4}f^2}$

and

$H(\phi_{L},\phi_{U},A_{L})=1.12 \cdot 10^{-3}\left(\frac{\phi_{U}}{\phi_{L}}\right)(\phi_{U}A_{L})^{0.55}$.

Similarly, the ITU-R proposes a statistical scaling model valid in the frequency range from 7 to 55 GHz. This model defines a scaling ratio similar to that proposed by Boithias, except for $H(\phi_{L},\phi_{U},A_{L})$, which is expressed as:

$H_{ITU}(\phi_{L},\phi_{U},A_{L})=1.12 \cdot 10^{-3}\left(\frac{\phi_{U}}{\phi_{L}} \right)^{0.5}(\phi_{U}A_{L})^{0.55}$.

The advantage associated with statistical frequency scaling (S-FS) models is their relatively minimal input requirements, typically involving only the operating frequency and, in some cases, the rain attenuation evaluated at the reference frequency. However, it has been demonstrated that these models tend to be accurate only for specific frequency pairs, and no model has shown consistent accuracy across a broader frequency range.

== Instantaneous frequency scaling models ==
I-FS models can be applied at each individual time instant, thereby accommodating the variability of the frequency scaling ratio between different rain events and even within a single rain event. This variability can be accurately accounted for by utilizing the specific rain attenuation, namely $\gamma_{R}$ (dB/km), which is calculated based on the actual rainfall rate measured at the ground station. Assuming that the impact of the link and the rainfall remains the same across both frequencies, it is possible to define a scaling ratio by using the specific rain attenuation values at the lower and upper frequencies, rather than the relative attenuation values. This is expressed, for a generic time instant $t_{0}$, as:

$R_{FS}(t_{0}) = \frac{\gamma_{R}(t_{0},f_{U})}{\gamma_{R}(t_{0},f_{L})}$.

A relatively straightforward approach for the estimation of $\gamma_{R}(t_{0},f)$ is proposed in the Recommendation ITU-R P.838-3, where the specific rain attenuation is modeled from the local rain rate $R$ (mm/h) using the following power-law relationship:

$\gamma_{R}^{ITU}(t_{0},f) = k(f,pol,\theta) R(t_{0})^{\alpha(f,pol,\theta)} \quad \text{(dB/km)}$

where $f$ (GHz) is the frequency, $pol$ (rad) is the signal polarization and $\theta$ (rad) is the link elevation angle. Values for $k$ and $\alpha$ are tabulated in the referenced Recommendation for frequencies in the range from 1 to 1000 GHz.

$R$ measurements are typically collected using rain gauges, which provide time series of rainfall rate. Additionally, if a disdrometer is available at the site, it can measure not only the precipitation intensity but also the physical microproperties of hydrometeors, such as the size and falling velocity of the drops. This allows for the computation of the raindrop size distribution (DSD):

$N(d_{i}) = \sum_{j=1}^{N_{V}} \frac{n(d_{i},v_{j})}{S\ v(d_{i},v_{j})\ T \ \Delta d_{i}} \quad \left(\frac{\text{mm}^{-1}}{\text{m}^{3}}\right)$

where $\Delta d_{i}$ (mm) represents the width of each drop-size class, $S \ (\text{mm}^{2})$ is the disdrometer sampling area, $T$ (s) is the instrument integration time and $N_{V}$ is the number of velocity classes. Consequently, the specific rain attenuation at a generic time instant $t_{0}$ depends on $N$ as:

$\gamma_{R}^{DSD}(t_{0},f)=4.343 \cdot 10^{3} \frac{\lambda^{2}}{\pi} \sum_{i=1}^{N_{D}} Re[S_{0}(d_{i},f)]\ N(d_{i})\ \Delta d_{i} \quad \text{(dB/km)}$

where $N_{D}$ is the number of diameter classes measured by the disdrometer, while the forward scattering coefficient $S_{0}$ is calculated using the T-matrix method, assuming the axial ratio defined by Beard and Chuang. Although this approach provides highly frequency scaling accuracy, DSD data are seldom available among network planners.

== See also ==
- Decibel
- Disdrometer
- ITU-R
- Link budget
- Polarization
- Radio
- Rain fade
- Rain gauge
- Raindrop size distribution
- RF planning
