= Precipitation gauge =

The term "Precipitation gauge" may refer to:

- Disdrometer, an instrument used to measure the drop size distribution and velocity of falling hydrometeors
- Rain gauge, also known as an udometer, a pluviometer, an ombrometer or a cup is a type of instrument used by meteorologists and hydrologists to gather and measure the amount of liquid precipitation over a set period of time
- Snow gauge, a type of instrument used by meteorologists and hydrologists to gather and measure the amount of solid precipitation over a set period of time
