= SNOTEL =

Network of snowpack sensors

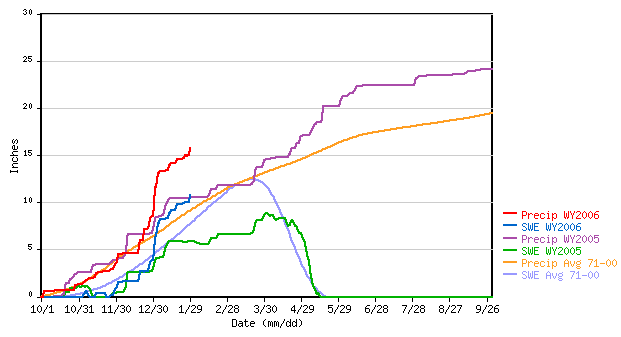
Data from a SNOTEL site in Elko County, Nevada

SNOTEL is an automated system of snowpack and related climate sensors operated by the Natural Resources Conservation Service (NRCS) of the United States Department of Agriculture in the Western United States.

There are over 900 SNOTEL (or snow telemetry) sites in 11 states, including Alaska. The sites are generally located in remote high-mountain watersheds where access is often difficult or restricted. Access for maintenance by the NRCS includes various modes from hiking and skiing to helicopters.

All SNOTEL sites measure snow water content, accumulated precipitation, and air temperature. Some sites also measure snow depth, soil moisture and temperature, wind speed, solar radiation, humidity, and atmospheric pressure. These data are used to forecast yearly water supplies, predict floods, and for general climate research.

== History ==
Installation of SNOTEL began in the mid-1960s. Its use in climate forecasting was not originally envisioned, but it has become the standard climate data for western U.S. locations which are elevated sufficiently to have at least a seasonal snowpack. Ongoing algorithm upgrades correct and backfill missing data, while improvements in communications improve the overall quality of data collection.

== Meteor burst technology (phased out) ==
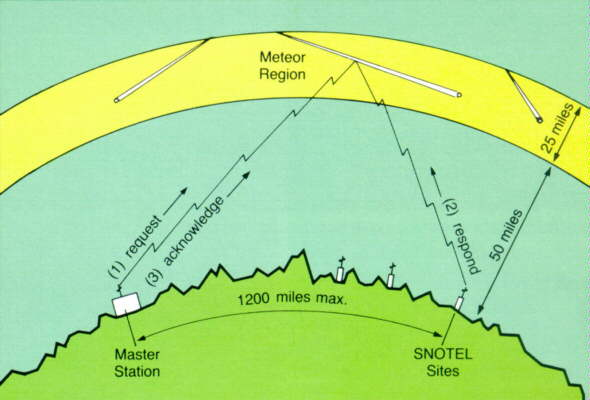
SNOTEL sites make use of meteor burst communications technology

SNOTEL used to use meteor burst communications technology to collect and communicate data in near-real-time. VHF radio signals are reflected at a steep angle off the ever-present band of ionized meteors existing from about 50 to 75 miles (80 to 120 km) above the earth.

Sites are designed to operate unattended and without maintenance for a year. They are battery powered with solar cell recharge. The condition of each site is monitored daily when it reports on 8 operational functions. Serious problems or deteriorating performance trigger a response from the NRCS electronics technicians located in six data collection offices. A central computer at the NRCS's National Water and Climate Center (NWCC) in Portland, Oregon controls system operations and receives the data collected by the SNOTEL network.

Meteor burst has been phased out of all SNOTEL sites. Today, SNOTEL sites use GOES, iridium, and cell networks to telemeter data.

== System capabilities ==
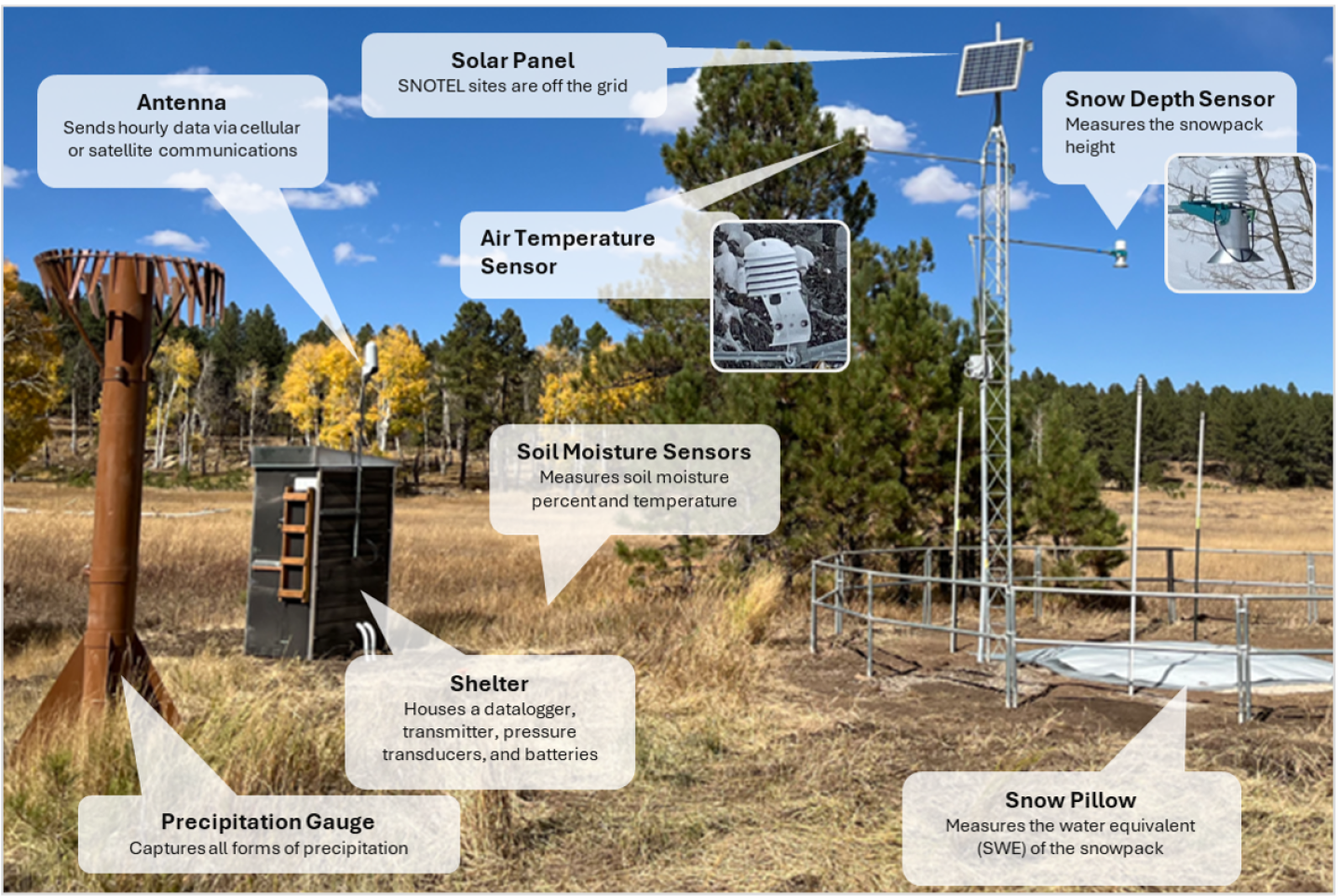
SNOTEL diagram

Basic SNOTEL sites have a pressure sensing snow pillow, storage precipitation gauge, and air temperature sensor. However, they can accommodate 64 channels of data and will accept analog and parallel or serial digital sensors. On-site microprocessors provide functions such as computing daily maximum, minimum, and average temperature information. Generally, sensor data are recorded every 15 minutes and reported out in a daily poll of all sites. Special polls are conducted more frequently in response to specific needs.

The new generation of remote sites, master stations, and central computer facilities allows for hourly interrogation of remote sites. The system has the ability to vary the configuration of a remote site by transmitting the appropriate commands telling the remote site what sensors to turn on or what parameters to send.

A variety of calculations can be made on any sensor channel. For example, the user can select maximum, minimum, average, standard deviation, or circular averaging.

Each sensor can be accessed independently at a specific interval. For example, wind speed may be sensed every minute during the day to arrive at an average, while the snow pillow may be accessed every 15 minutes for the accumulated total.

System performance has increased over the years, mainly due to a better understanding of meteor burst communication characteristics and improved equipment. While a 95 percent response to a system-wide poll is the standard, over 99 percent is common.

== Data storage, management and accessibility ==
All data are received by the SNOTEL central computer, which in turn is linked to the Centralized Forecasting System (CFS) in the NWCC where data can be accessed. Once on the CFS the data is kept in a relational database, where various analysis and graphics programs are available. Current and historical data and analyses are available by dialing into the CFS, by disk or tape media, paper copy, and on the Internet.
