= Snow pillow =

Measuring device for snowpack

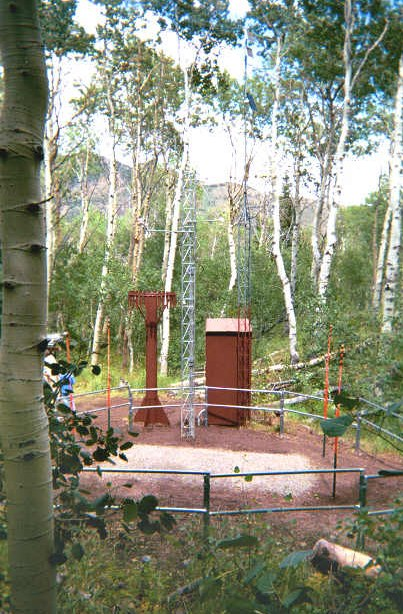
The large panel in the foreground is the snow pillow

A snow pillow is a device for measuring snowpack, especially for automated reporting stations such as SNOTEL.

The snow pillow measures the water equivalent of the snow pack based on hydrostatic pressure created by overlying snow. Any discrepancy due to bridging is minimized by the large dimension of the pillow, typically 9 square metres (11 sq yd).

Another application for snow pillows is to estimate the snow weight on a roof to warn of potential for roof collapse.

Snow pillows were developed in the early 1960s.

== Set-up ==
Large dimensions (e.g. 3 m × 3 m) of the pillow prevent any bridging that might occur from having an effect on the measurement readings. For snow pressure measurement on roofs using a smaller snow pillow (e.g. 1 m × 1 m) is the better choice, because of the weight of the filling of the snow pillow.

== See also ==
- Snowboard
- Snow gauge
