= Snow science =

Interdisciplinary field of hydrology, mechanics and meteorology

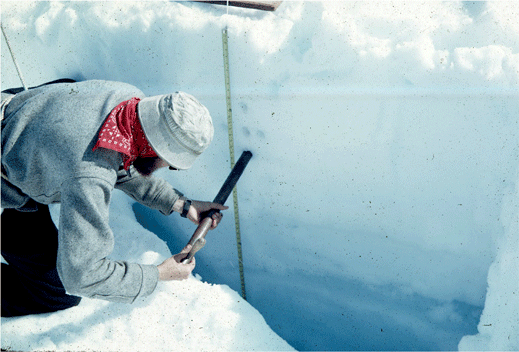
Snow pit on the surface of a glacier, profiling snow properties, which become increasingly dense as it metamorphoses towards ice.

Snow science addresses how snow forms, its distribution, and processes affecting how snowpacks change over time. Scientists improve storm forecasting, study global snow cover and its effect on climate, glaciers, and water supplies around the world. The study includes physical properties of the material as it changes, bulk properties of in-place snow packs, and the aggregate properties of regions with snow cover. In doing so, they employ on-the-ground physical measurement techniques to establish ground truth and remote sensing techniques to develop understanding of snow-related processes over large areas.

== History ==
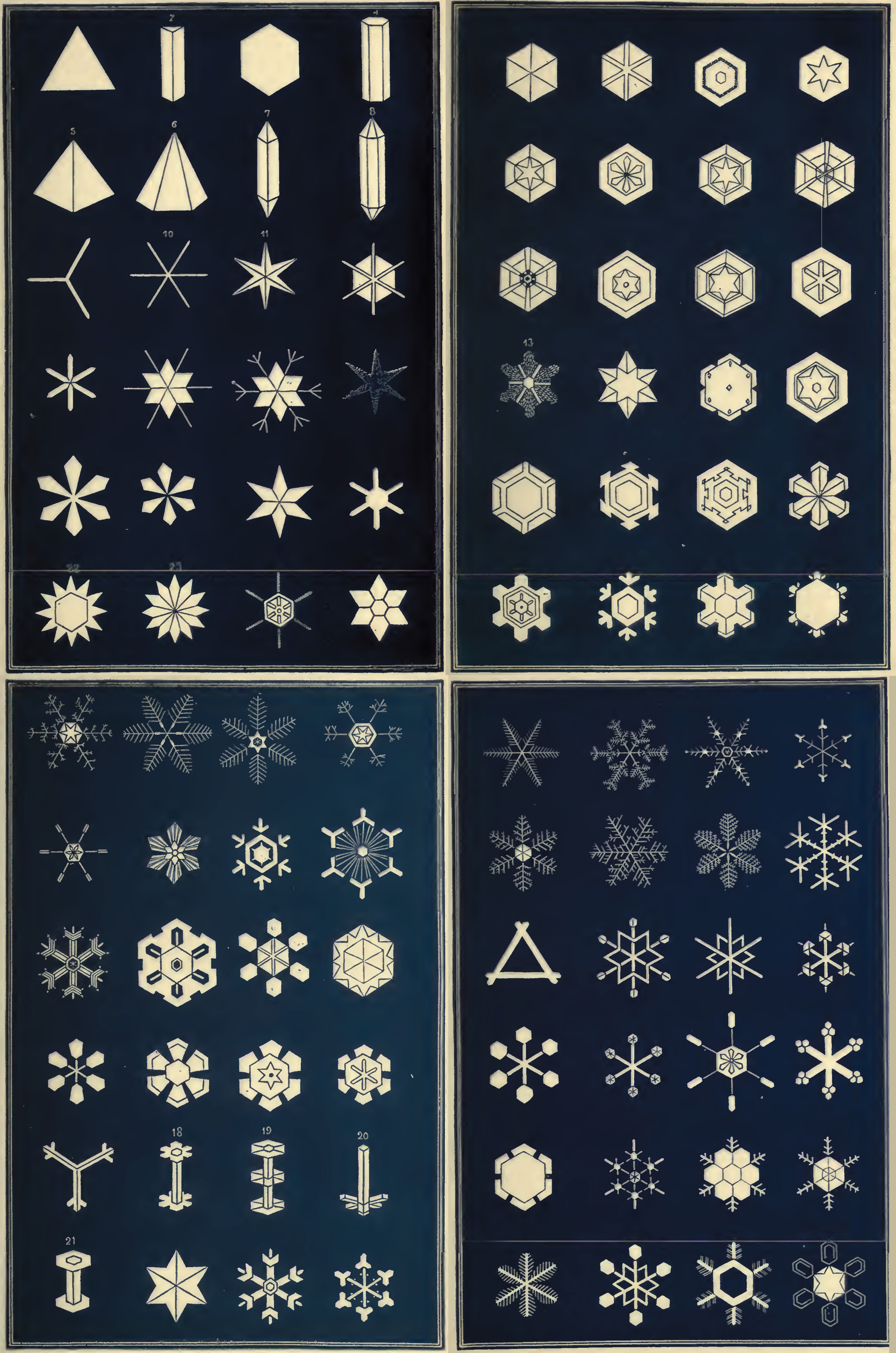
An early classification of snowflakes by Israel Perkins Warren.

Snow was described in China, as early as 135 BCE in Han Ying's (Note: 寒 (hán), meaning "cold" or "winter" 英 (yīng), meaning "flower" or "petal". The personal name Han Ying (韩英) is not winter flowers) book Moral Discourses Illustrating the Han Text of the Book of Odes, (Note: with regards to translation differences: Book of Odes (Han text)) which contrasted the pentagonal symmetry of flowers with the hexagonal symmetry of snow. Albertus Magnus proved what may be the earliest detailed European description of snow in 1250. Johannes Kepler attempted to explain why snow crystals are hexagonal in his 1611 book, Strena seu De Nive Sexangula. In 1675 Friedrich Martens, a German physician, catalogued 24 types of snow crystal. In 1865, Frances E. Chickering published Cloud Crystals - a Snow-Flake Album. In 1894, A. A. Sigson photographed snowflakes under a microscope, preceding Wilson Bentley's series of photographs of individual snowflakes in the Monthly Weather Review.

Ukichiro Nakaya began an extensive study on snowflakes in 1932. From 1936 to 1949, Nakaya created the first artificial snow crystals and charted the relationship between temperature and water vapor saturation, later called the Nakaya Diagram and other works of research in snow, which were published in 1954 by Harvard University Press publishes as Snow Crystals: Natural and Artificial. Teisaku Kobayashi, verified and improves the Nakaya Diagram with the 1960 Kobayashi Diagram, later refined in 1962.

Further interest in artificial snowflake genesis continued in 1982 with Toshio Kuroda and Rolf Lacmann, of the Braunschweig University of Technology, publishing Growth Kinetics of Ice from the Vapour Phase and its Growth Forms. In August 1983, Astronauts synthesized snow crystals in orbit on the Space Shuttle Challenger during mission STS-8. By 1988 Norihiko Fukuta et al. confirmed the Nakaya Diagram with artificial snow crystals, made in an updraft and Yoshinori Furukawa demonstrated snow crystal growth in space.

== Measurement ==
Snow scientists typically excavate a snow pit within which to make basic measurements and observations. Observations can describe features caused by wind, water percolation, or snow unloading from trees. Water percolation into a snowpack can create flow fingers and ponding or flow along capillary barriers, which can refreeze into horizontal and vertical solid ice formations within the snowpack. Among the measurements of the properties of snowpacks (together with their codes) that the International Classification for Seasonal Snow on the Ground presents are:

- Height (H) is measured vertically from the ground surface, usually in centimeters.
- Thickness (D) is snow depth measured at right angles to the slope on inclined snow covers, usually in centimeters.
- Height of snowpack (HS) is the total depth of the snowpack, measured vertically in centimetres from base to snow surface.
- Height of new snow (HN) is the depth in centimeters of freshly fallen snow that accumulated on a snow board during a period of 24 hours or some other, specified period.
- Snow water equivalent (SWE) is the depth of water that would result if the snow mass melted completely, whether over a given region or a confined snow plot, calculated as the product of the snow height in meters times the vertically-integrated density in kilograms per cubic meter.
- Water equivalent of snowfall (HNW) is the snow water equivalent of snowfall, measured for a standard observing period of 24 hours or other period.
- Snow strength (Σ) whether compressive, tensile, or shear, snow strength can be regarded as the maximum stress snow can withstand without failing or fracturing, expressed in pascals per second, squared.
- Penetrability of snow surface (P) is the depth that an object penetrates into the snow from the surface, usually measured with a Swiss rammsonde, or more crudely by a person standing or on skis, in centimeters.
- Surface features (SF) describes the general appearance of the snow surface, owing to deposition, redistribution and erosion by wind, melting and refreezing, sublimation and evaporation, and rain. The following processes have the corresponding results: smooth—deposition without wind; wavy—wind deposited snow; concave furrows—melt and sublimation; convex furrows—rain or melt; random furrows—erosion.
- Snow covered area (SCA) describes the extent of snow-covered ground, usually expressed as a fraction (%) of the total.
- Slope angle (Φ) is the angle measured from the horizontal to the plane of a slope with a clinometer.
- Aspect of slope (AS) is the compass direction towards which a slope faces, normal to the contours of elevation, given either degrees from true North N = 0° = 360° or as N, NE, E, SE, S, SW, W, NW.
- Time (t) is usually given in seconds for a measurement duration or in longer units to describe the age of snow deposits and layers.

=== Instruments ===
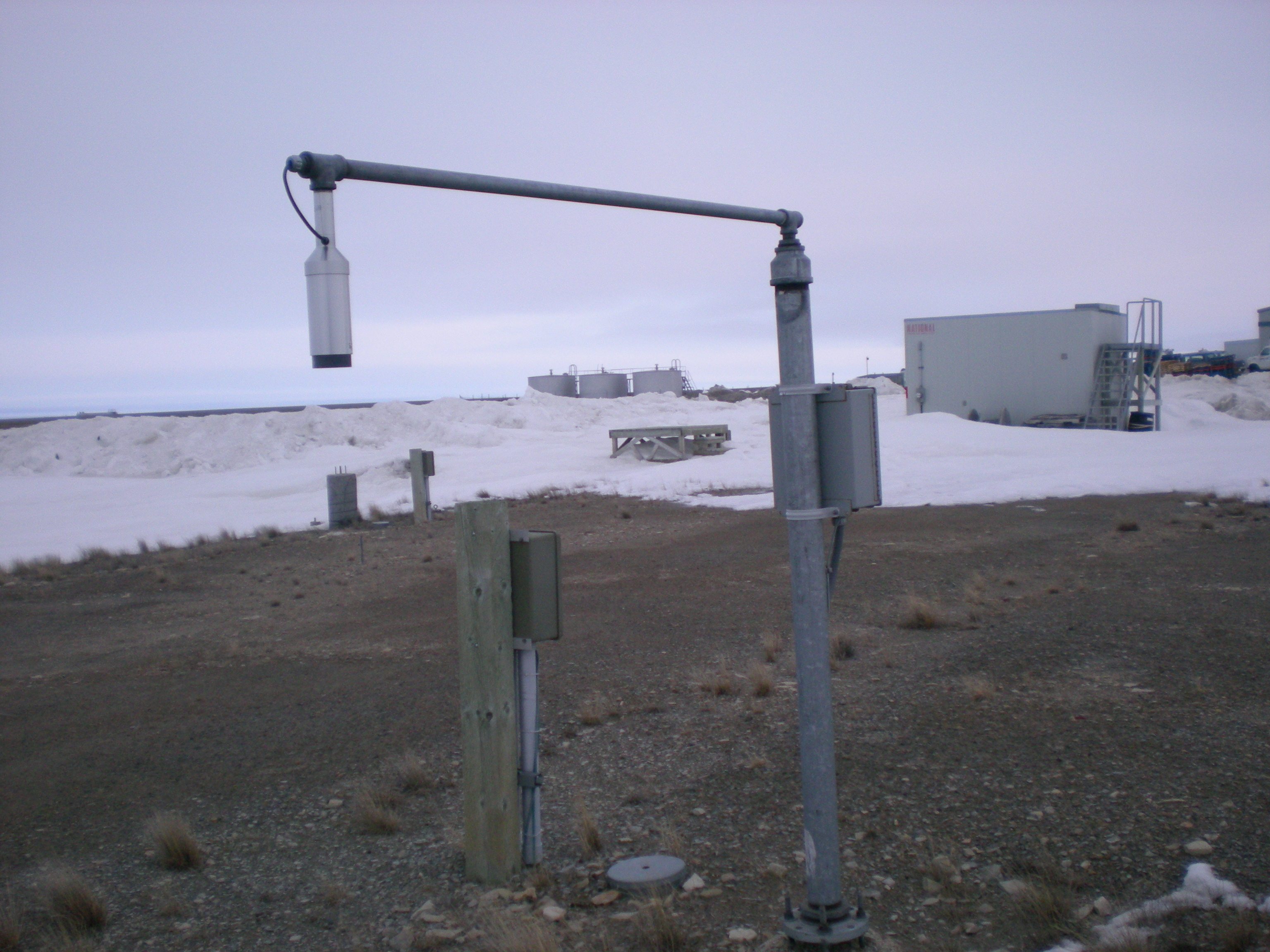
An ultrasonic snow depth sensor

Depth – Depth of snow is measured with a snowboard (typically a piece of plywood painted white) observed during a six-hour period. At the end of the six-hour period, all snow is cleared from the measuring surface. For a daily total snowfall, four six-hour snowfall measurements are summed. Snowfall can be very difficult to measure due to melting, compacting, blowing and drifting.

Liquid equivalent by snow gauge – The liquid equivalent of snowfall may be evaluated using a snow gauge or with a standard rain gauge having a diameter of 100 mm (4 in; plastic) or 200 mm (8 in; metal). Rain gauges are adjusted to winter by removing the funnel and inner cylinder and allowing the snow/freezing rain to collect inside the outer cylinder. Antifreeze liquid may be added to melt the snow or ice that falls into the gauge. In both types of gauges once the snowfall/ice is finished accumulating, or as its height in the gauge approaches 300 mm (12 in), the snow is melted and the water amount recorded.

== Classification ==
The International Classification for Seasonal Snow on the Ground has a more extensive classification of deposited snow than those that pertain to airborne snow. A list of the main categories (quoted together with their codes) comprises:

- Precipitation particles (PP) (See below)
- Machine-made snow (MM) – May be round polycrystalline particles from freezing of very small water droplets from the surface inward or crushed ice particles from crushing and forced distribution
- Decomposing and fragmented precipitation particles (DF) — Decomposition is caused by a decrease of surface area to reduce surface free energy initial break up by light winds. Wind causes fragmentation, packing and rounding of particles.
- Rounded Grains (RG) – Vary from rounded, usually elongated particles of size around 0.25 mm, which are highly sintered. They may be wind packed or faceted rounded, as well.
- Faceted Crystals (FC) – Grow with grain-to-grain vapour diffusion driven by a large temperature gradient is the primary driver of faceted crystals within the dry snowpack.
- Depth Hoar (DH) – Grain-to-grain vapour diffusion driven by large temperature gradient is the primary driver of depth hoar within the dry snowpack.
- Surface Hoar (SH) – Rapid growth of crystals at the snow surface by transfer of water vapor from the atmosphere toward the snow surface, which is cooled by radiative cooling below ambient temperature.
- Melt Forms (MF) – Range from clustered round grains of wet snow through melt-freeze rounded polycrystals when water in veins freezes to loosely bonded, fully rounded single crystals and polycrystals.to polycrystals from a surface layer of wet snow that refroze after having been wetted by melt or rainfall.
- Ice Formations (IF) – Encompass the following features: Horizontal layers, resulting from rain or meltwater from the surface percolating into cold snow and refreezing along layer barriers. Vertical fingers of frozen drained water. A basal crust resurgent from melt water ponding above a substrate and freezes. A glaze of ice on the snow surface, resulting from freezing rain on snow. A sun crust from melt water at the surface snow refreezes at the surface due to radiative cooling.

=== Precipitation particles ===
The classification of frozen particulates extends the prior classifications of Nakaya and his successors and are quoted in the following table:

Precipitation particles
Subclass	Shape	Physical process
Columns	Prismatic crystal, solid or hollow	Growth from water vapour at −8 °C and below–30 °C
Needles	Needle-like, approximately cylindrical	Growth from water vapour at super-saturation at −3 to −5 °C below −60 °C
Plates	Plate-like, mostly hexagonal	Growth from water vapour at 0 to −3 °C and −8 to −70 °C
Stellars, Dendrites	Six-fold star-like, planar or spatial	Growth from water vapour at supersaturation at 0 to −3 °C and at −12 to −16 °C
Irregular crystals	Clusters of very small crystals	Polycrystals growing in varying environmental conditions
Graupel	Heavily rimed particles, spherical, conical, hexagonal or irregular in shape	Heavy riming of particles by accretion of supercooled water droplets
Hail	Laminar internal structure, translucent or milky glazed surface	Growth by accretion of supercooled water, size: >5 mm
Ice pellets	Transparent, mostly small spheroids	Freezing of raindrops or refreezing of largely melted snow crystals or snowflakes (sleet). Graupel or snow pellets encased in thin ice layer (small hail). Size: both 5 mm
Rime	Irregular deposits or longer cones and needles pointing into the wind	Accretion of small, supercooled fog droplets frozen in place. Thin breakable crust forms on snow surface if process continues long enough.

All are formed in cloud, except for rime, which forms on objects exposed to supercooled moisture, and some plate, dendrites and stellars, which can form in a temperature inversion under clear sky.

== Physical properties ==
Each such layer of a snowpack differs from the adjacent layers by one or more characteristics that describe its microstructure or density, which together define the snow type, and other physical properties. Thus, at any one time, the type and state of the snow forming a layer have to be defined because its physical and mechanical properties depend on them. The International Classification for Seasonal Snow on the Ground lays out the following measurements of snow properties (together with their codes):

- Microstructure of snow is complex and hard to measure, yet has a critical influence on the thermal, mechanical, and electromagnetic properties of snow. Although there are multiple means for characterizing microstructure, there is no standard method.
- Grain shape (F ) includes both natural and artificial depositions, which may have decomposed or include newly formed crystals freeze-thaw or from hoar frost.
- Grain size (E ) represents the average size of grains, each measured at its greatest extension, measured in millimetres.
- Snow density (ρ_{s} ) is the mass per unit volume of snow of a known volume, calculated as kg/m^{3}. Classification runs from very fine at below 0.2 mm to very coarse (2.0–5.0 mm) and beyond.
- Snow hardness (R ) is the resistance to penetration of an object into snow. Most snow studies use a fist or fingers for softer snows (very soft through medium) and a pencil (hard) or knife (very hard) below the hardness boundary of ice.
- Liquid water content (LWC ) (or free-water content) is the amount of water within the snow in the liquid phase from either melt, rain, or both. Measurements are expressed as a volume or mass fraction in percent. Dry snow has a 0% mean volume fraction. Wet snow 5.5% and soaked is greater than 15%.
- Snow temperature (T_{s} ) is frequently measured at various elevations in and above the snow column: at the ground, at the surface and a reported height above the surface in °C.
- Impurities (J ) commonly are dust, sand, soot, acids, organic and soluble materials; each should be fully described and reported as mass fraction (%, ppm).
- Layer thickness (L ) of each stratum of a snowpack is measured in cm.

Freshly fallen and metamorphosed snow crystals

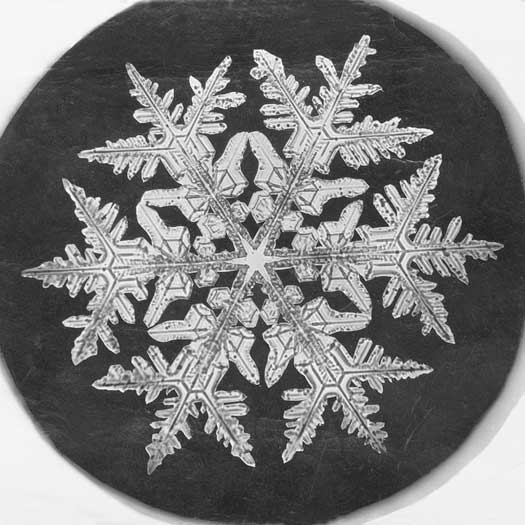
Dendritic snowflake—micrograph by Wilson Bentley.

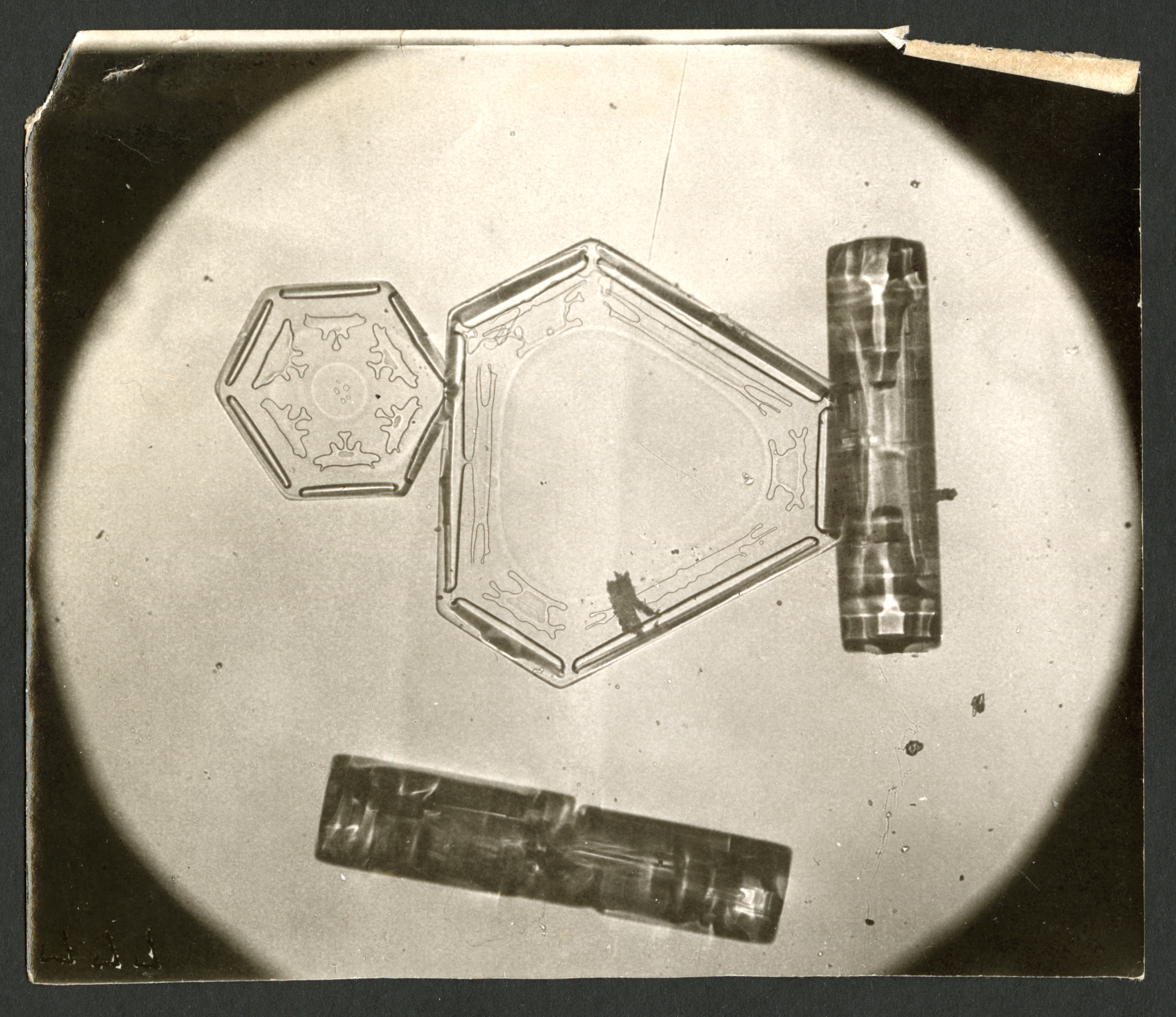
Platelets and needles, two alternate forms of snowflakes.

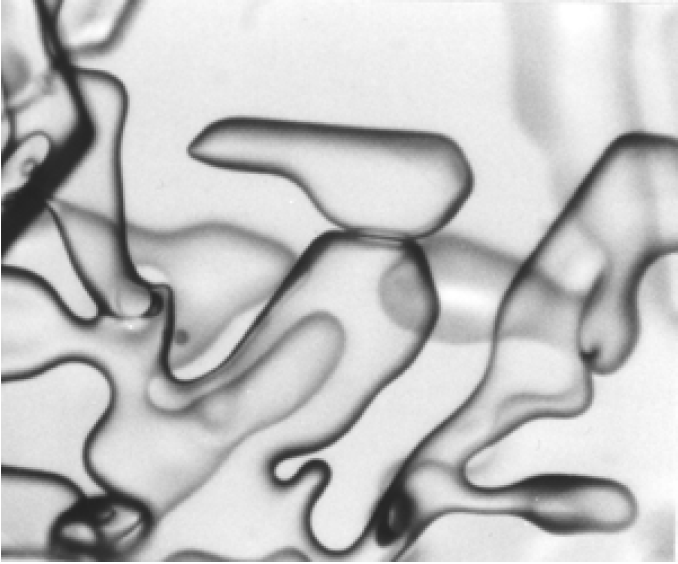
Fresh, dry snow with newly formed bonds, showing a grain boundary (top center).

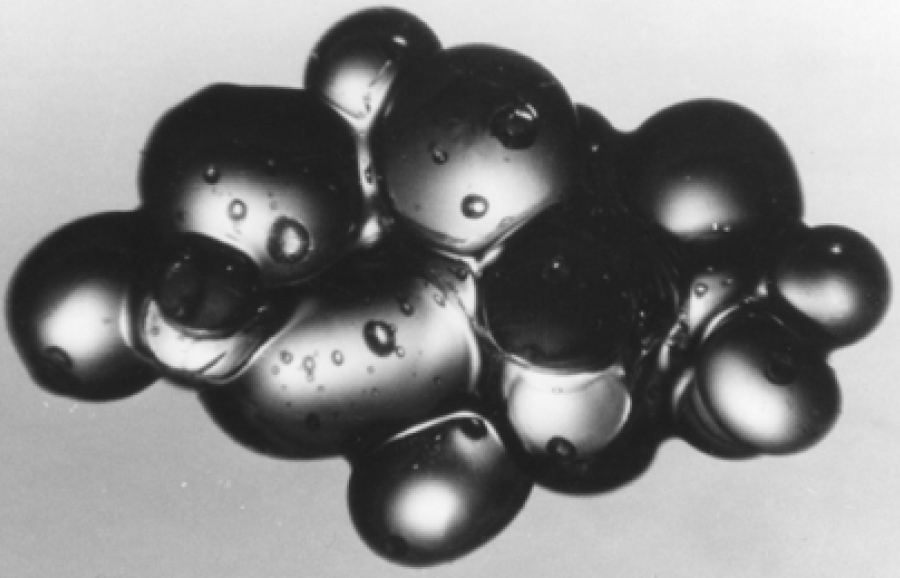
Cluster of ice grains in wet snow at a low liquid content—grain crystals range 0.5 to 1.0 mm.

== Satellite data and analysis ==
Remote sensing of snowpacks with satellites and other platforms typically includes multi-spectral collection of imagery. Sophisticated interpretation of the data obtained allows inferences about what is observed. The science behind these remote observations has been verified with ground-truth studies of the actual conditions.

Satellite observations record a decrease in snow-covered areas since the 1960s, when satellite observations began. In some regions such as China, a trend of increasing snow cover has been observed (from 1978 to 2006). These changes are attributed to global climate change, which may lead to earlier melting and less aea coverage. However, in some areas there may be an increase in snow depth because of higher temperatures for latitudes north of 40°. For the Northern Hemisphere as a whole the mean monthly snow-cover extent has been decreasing by 1.3% per decade.

Satellite observation of snow relies on the usefulness of the physical and spectral properties of snow for analysing remotely sensed data. Dietz, et al. summarize this, as follows:

- Snow reflects a high proportion of incident radiation in visible wavelengths.
- The Earth continuously emits microwave radiation from its surface that can be measured from space using passive microwave sensors.
- The use of active microwave data to map snow-cover characteristics is limited by the fact that only wet snow can be recognized reliably.

The most frequently used methods to map and measure snow extent, snow depth and snow water equivalent employ multiple inputs on the visible–infrared spectrum to deduce the presence and properties of snow. The National Snow and Ice Data Center (NSIDC) uses the reflectance of visible and infrared radiation to calculate a normalized difference snow index, which is a ratio of radiation parameters that can distinguish between clouds and snow. Other researchers have developed decision trees, employing the available data to make more accurate assessments. One challenge to this assessment is where snow cover is patchy, for example during periods of accumulation or ablation and also in forested areas. Cloud cover inhibits optical sensing of surface reflectance, which has led to other methods for estimating ground conditions underneath clouds. For hydrological models, it is important to have continuous information about the snow cover. Applicable techniques involve interpolation, using the known to infer the unknown. Passive microwaves sensors are especially valuable for temporal and spatial continuity because they can map the surface beneath clouds and in darkness. When combined with reflective measurements, passive microwave sensing greatly extends the inferences possible about the snowpack.

== Models ==
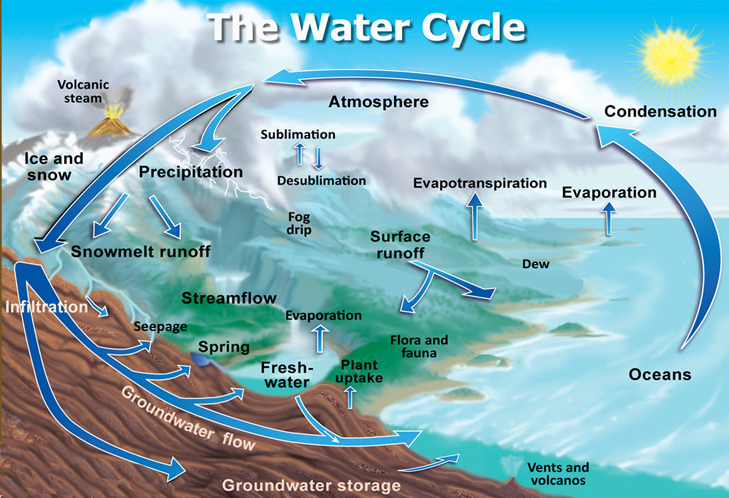
Snowfall and snowmelt are parts of the Earth's water cycle.

Snow science often leads to predictive models that include snow deposition, snow melt, and snow hydrology—elements of the Earth's water cycle—which help describe global climate change.

=== Global climate change ===
Global climate change models (GCMs) incorporate snow as a factor in their calculations. Some important aspects of snow cover include its albedo (reflectivity of light) and insulating qualities, which slow the rate of seasonal melting of sea ice. As of 2011, the melt phase of GCM snow models were thought to perform poorly in regions with complex factors that regulate snowmelt, such as vegetation cover and terrain. These models compute snow water equivalent (SWE) in some manner, such as:

SWE = [ –ln( 1 – f_{c} )] / D

where:

- f_{c} = fractional coverage of snow
- D = masking depth of vegetation (≈ 0.2 m worldwide)

=== Snowmelt ===
Given the importance of snowmelt to agriculture, hydrological runoff models that include snow in their predictions address the phases of accumulating snowpack, melting processes, and distribution of the meltwater through stream networks and into the groundwater. Key to describing the melting processes are solar heat flux, ambient temperature, wind, and precipitation. Initial snowmelt models used a degree-day approach that emphasized the temperature difference between the air and the snowpack to compute snow water equivalent (SWE) as:

SWE = M (T_{a} – T_{m}) when T_{a} ≥ T_{m}

= 0 when T_{a} < T_{m}

where:

- M = melt coefficient
- T_{a} = air temperature
- T_{m} = snowpack temperature

More recent models use an energy balance approach that take into account the following factors to compute the energy available for melt (Q_{m}) as:

Q_{m} = Q^{*} +Q_{h} + Q_{e} + Q_{g} + Q_{r} – Q_{Θ}

where:

- Q^{*} = net radiation
- Q_{h} = convective transfer of sensible heat between snowpack and airmass
- Q_{e} = latent heat lost through evaporation from or condensation onto the snowpack
- Q_{g} = conduction of heat from the ground into the snowpack
- Q_{r} = advection of heat through rain
- Q_{Θ} = rate of change of internal energy per unit of surface area

Calculation of the various heat flow quantities (Q ) requires measurement of a much greater range of snow and environmental factors than just temperatures.

== Engineering ==
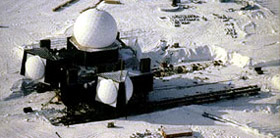
Move of DYE 2 radar facility to new foundations on the Greenland ice cap.

Knowledge gained from science translates into engineering. Four examples are the construction and maintenance of facilities on polar ice caps, the establishment of snow runways, the design of snow tires and ski sliding surfaces.

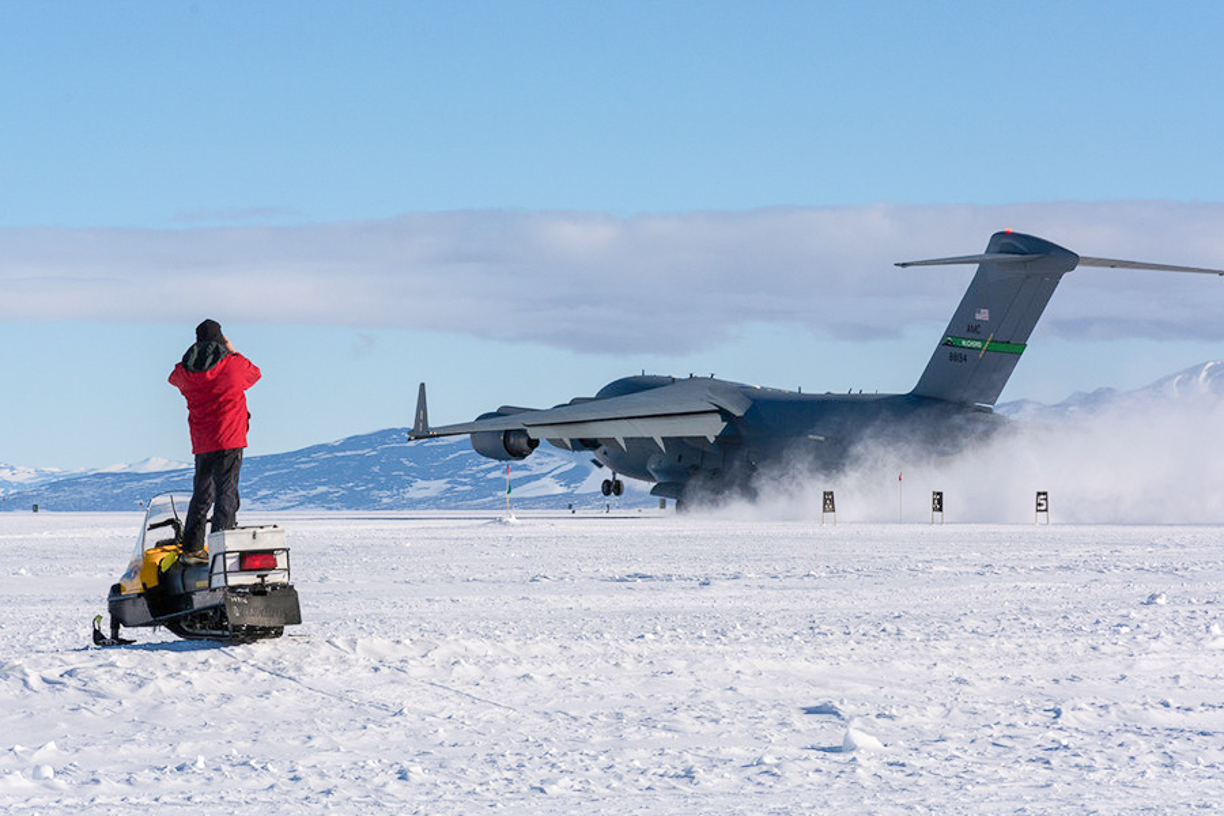
Acceptance tests of the Phoenix Runway for wheeled aircraft at McMurdo Station with a Boeing C-17.

- Buildings on snow foundations – The US Army Cold Regions Research and Engineering Laboratory (CRREL) played a role in assisting the U.S. Air Force to establish and maintain a system of Distant Early Warning (DEW) Line facilities during the Cold War era. In 1976, a CRREL researcher was instrumental in the moving of a 10-story-high, 2,900 t (3,200-short-ton) DEW Line facility on the Greenland Ice Cap from a foundation that had been compromised by the movement of the ice on which it was built to a new foundation. This required the measurement of in-situ snow strength and its use in the design of new foundations for the building.
- Snow runways – In 2016, CRREL Research Civil Engineers designed, built and tested a new snow runway for the McMurdo Station, called "Phoenix". It is designed accommodate approximately 60 annual sorties of heavy, wheeled transport aircraft. The compacted snow runway was designed and constructed to service a Boeing C-17 weighing more than 230,000 kg (500,000 lb). This required engineering knowledge of the properties of mechanically-hardened snow.
- Snow tires – Snow tires perform three functions: compaction, shear bonding and bearing. On roadways they compact the snow in front of them and provide a shear bond between the treads and the compacted snow. Off-road, they also provide bearing on the compacted snow. The bearing contact must be low enough for the tires not to sink too deeply for forward progress to become impeded by compacting the snow in front of them. Tread design is critical to snow tires used on roads and represent a tradeoff between on-snow traction and dry and wet-road comfort and handling.
- Snow sliders – The ability of a ski or other runner to slide over snow depends on both the properties of the snow and the ski to result in an optimum amount of lubrication from melting the snow by friction with the ski—too little and the ski interacts with solid snow crystals, too much and capillary attraction of meltwater retards the ski. Before a ski can slide, it must overcome the maximum value static friction, $F_{max} = \mu_\mathrm{s} F_{n}\,$, for the ski/snow contact, where $\mu_\mathrm{s}$ is the coefficient of static friction and $F_{n}\,$ is the normal force of the ski on snow. Kinetic (or dynamic) friction occurs when the ski is moving over the snow.
