= Effective radius =

Effective radius may refer to:

- Cloud drop effective radius, in meteorology
- Effective earth radius, a topic in radio wave propagation
- Galaxy effective radius, measure of the size of a galaxy

== See also ==
- Equivalent radius
