= Liquid water path =

Liquid water path - in units of g/m^{2} is a measure of the total amount of liquid water present between two points in the atmosphere.

LWP is an important quantity in understanding radiative transfer in the atmosphere. It is defined as the integral of liquid water content between two points in the atmosphere. For nadir observations and whole atmospheric column we have

$$LWP=\int_{z=0}^\infty \rho_{air} r_L dz'$$

where r_{L} is the liquid water mixing ratio and ρ_{air} is the density of air (including water loading).

The atmosphere is in approximate hydrostatic equilibrium and hydrostatic equation for atmospheric pressure is given by

$$\frac{dp}{dz}= - \rho_{air} g$$

which gives

$$LWP=\int_0^{p=p_0}  r_L dp/g$$

where g is gravitational acceleration, dp is the pressure increment between two layers in the atmosphere and integration is between surface and top of the atmosphere. Liquid water path can also be defined between any two selected points.

The liquid water path can be approximately retrieved from passive and active remote sensing such as microwave radiometer instruments, for example SSM/I.

Typical values of liquid water path in marine stratocumulus can be of the order of 20-80 g/m^{2}.

The liquid water path also contributes to important cloud properties. As the value of the liquid water path increases, so does the albedo of the cloud. This increase in albedo is seen most quickly at the lower end of the liquid water path spectrum, that is, the smaller the amount of total water, the quicker the albedo increases. The radiative absorption of clouds is also dependent on the liquid water path. An increase of liquid water path leads to an increase in absorption. Again, the largest increase is seen with lower levels of liquid water path. These connections are due to the proportionality between the liquid water path and the optical depth of the cloud.

== See also ==
- Liquid water content
