= National Water and Climate Center =

Government building in Portland, Oregon, U.S.

Agency overview
- Jurisdiction: Federal government of the United States
- Headquarters: Portland, Oregon, U.S.; 45.5298°N 122.6532°W
- Website: www.nrcs.usda.gov/resources/data-and-reports/snow-and-climate-monitoring-predefined-reports-and-maps

The United States National Water and Climate Center collects and disseminates water resources and climate data.

It is part of the Natural Resources Conservation Service of the United States Department of Agriculture (USDA). The offices are located in Portland, Oregon, near Lloyd Center.

Services include:

- Operates the SNOTEL network which controls and collects data from more than 730 automated snowpack and climate sensor sites.
