= Tianchi basin =

Tianchi basins were meteorological measuring instruments used to gather and measure the amount of liquid precipitation over a period of time during the Song Dynasty. The instrument was devised by the Song Chinese mathematician and inventor Qin Jiushao in 1247.

== History and usage ==
As precipitation was for important agriculture and food production, the Song Chinese mathematician and inventor Qin Jiushao developed a precipitation gauge that was widely used in 1247 during the Southern Song dynasty to gather meteorological data. Qin Jiushao later records application of rainfall measurements in the mathematical treatise Mathematical Treatise in Nine Sections. The book also discusses problems using large snow gauges made from bamboo situated in mountain passes and uplands which are speculated to be first referenced to snow measurement.

Tianchi basins were installed at provincial and district capitals and bamboo snow gauges were situated in mountain passes. The rain gauges were bowl-shaped with one being installed at each provincial and district capital in China. In the treatise, Qin Jiushao also discusses how point measurements were converted to real averages. These averages were important as they postulated indicators of natural disasters such as flooding, since river flooding has always been a problem in China.
