= Liquid water content =

Mass of water within a cloud

The liquid water content (LWC) is the measure of the mass of the water in a cloud in a specified amount of dry air. It is typically measured per volume of air (g/m^{3}) or mass of air (g/kg) (Bohren, 1998). This variable is important in figuring out which types of clouds are likely to form and is strongly linked to three other cloud microphysical variables: the cloud drop effective radius, the cloud drop number concentration, and the cloud drop size distribution (Wallace, 2006). Being able to determine the cloud formations that are likely to occur is extremely useful for weather forecasting as cumulonimbus clouds are related to thunderstorms and heavy rain whereas cirrus clouds are not directly associated with precipitation.

== Characteristics ==
The liquid water content of a cloud varies significantly depending on the type of clouds present in the atmosphere at a given location. The classification of the cloud is highly related to the liquid water content as well as the origin of the cloud. The combination of these two allows a forecaster to more readily predict the types of conditions that will be in an area based on the types of clouds that are forming or have already formed.

=== Relation to classification of clouds ===
Clouds that have low densities, such as cirrus clouds, contain very little water, thus resulting in relatively low liquid water content values of around .03 g/m^{3}. Clouds that have high densities, like cumulonimbus clouds, have much higher liquid water content values that are around 1-3 g/m^{3}, as more liquid is present in the same amount of space. Below is a chart giving typical LWC values of various cloud types (Thompson, 2007).

| Cloud Type | LWC (g/m^{3}) |
|---|---|
| cirrus | .03 |
| fog | .05 |
| stratus | .25-.30 |
| cumulus | .25-.30 |
| stratocumulus | .45 |
| cumulonimbus | 1.0-3.0 |

=== Maritime vs. continental ===
Maritime clouds tend to have fewer water droplets than continental clouds. The majority of maritime clouds have droplet concentrations between 100 drops/cm^{3} and about 200 drops/cm^{3} (Wallace, 2006). Continental clouds have much higher droplet concentrations ranging up to around 900 drops/cm^{3}. (Wallace, 2006). However, the droplet radius in maritime clouds tend to be larger, so that the result is that the LWC is relatively similar in both types of air masses for the same types of clouds (Linacre, 1998).

== Measuring techniques ==
There are several ways that can be used to measure the liquid water content of clouds.

One way involves an electrically heated wire. The wire is attached to the power supply and is situated on the outside of the airplane. As it moves through a cloud, water droplets hit the wire and evaporate, reducing the temperature of the wire. The resistance caused by this is measured and is used to determine the power needed to maintain the temperature. The power can be converted to a value for the LWC. (Wallace, 2006).

Another way involves an instrument that uses scattered light from a large number of drops. This value is then converted to a value for the LWC. (Wallace, 2006).

A cloud chamber can also be used to simulate adiabatic ascent in the atmosphere through the decrease of pressure by removing air inside the chamber. A series of equations shown in the section below show how the LWC is obtained in this procedure. (Thompson, 2007).

== Equations/relations ==
Various equations are useful in determining LWC and the effects that influence it. One of the most significant variables related to the LWC is the droplet concentration of a cloud.

=== Cloud droplet concentration ===
The droplet concentration of a cloud is the number of water droplets in a volume of cloud, typically a cubic centimeter (Wallace, 2006). The formula for the droplet concentration is as follows.

$$n = N/V$$

In this equation, N is the total number of water droplets in the volume, and V is the total volume of the cloud being measured. Converting this to a LWC gives an equation that is shown below.

$$LWC = (m_w \cdot n) / N$$

In this equation, m_{w} is the mass of the water in the air parcel.

=== Cloud chamber ===
A common type of experiment is one that involves a cloud chamber that is de-pressurized to simulate adiabatic ascent of air parcels. Determining LWC is a simple calculation shown below (Thompson, 2007).

$$LWC = m_w / V_c$$

M_{w} is the mass of the water in the cloud chamber and V_{c} is the volume of the cloud chamber. Obtaining the mass of the liquid water in the cloud chamber is possible through an equation involving the latent heat of condensation (Thompson, 2007).

$$m_w = \frac{-m_a \cdot c_p \cdot \Delta T_a}{L_c(T)}$$

In the equation above, L_{c}(T) is the latent heat of condensation of water at temperature T, m_{a} is the mass of the air in the cloud chamber, c_{p} is the specific heat of dry air at constant pressure and $\Delta T_a$ is the change in the temperature of the air due to latent heat.

== See also ==
- Liquid water path
