= Cloud drop effective radius =

Average of size of cloud droplets

The cloud drop effective radius (alternatively cloud effective radius or simply effective radius when in context) is a weighted mean of the size distribution of cloud droplets. The term was defined in 1974 by James E. Hansen and Larry Travis as the ratio of the third to the second moment of a droplet size distribution to aid in the inversion of remotely sensed data. Physically, it is an area weighted radius of the cloud drop particles. Mathematically, this can be expressed as
$$r_e = \dfrac{\displaystyle \int_{0}^{\infty} \pi r^3 \cdot n(r)\,dr}{\displaystyle \int_{0}^{\infty} \pi r^2 \cdot n(r)\,dr}.$$

The global effective particle radius has different values for water and ice clouds: the former is around 14 μm, whereas for ice it is around 25 μm. Studies also indicate that the effective cloud droplet radius is larger over oceans than over land by 15%–20%. By contrast, the difference in the ice particle size over land and oceans is much smaller (only 5%).

== See also ==
- Liquid water content
- Raindrop size distribution
