= Snowboard (meteorology) =

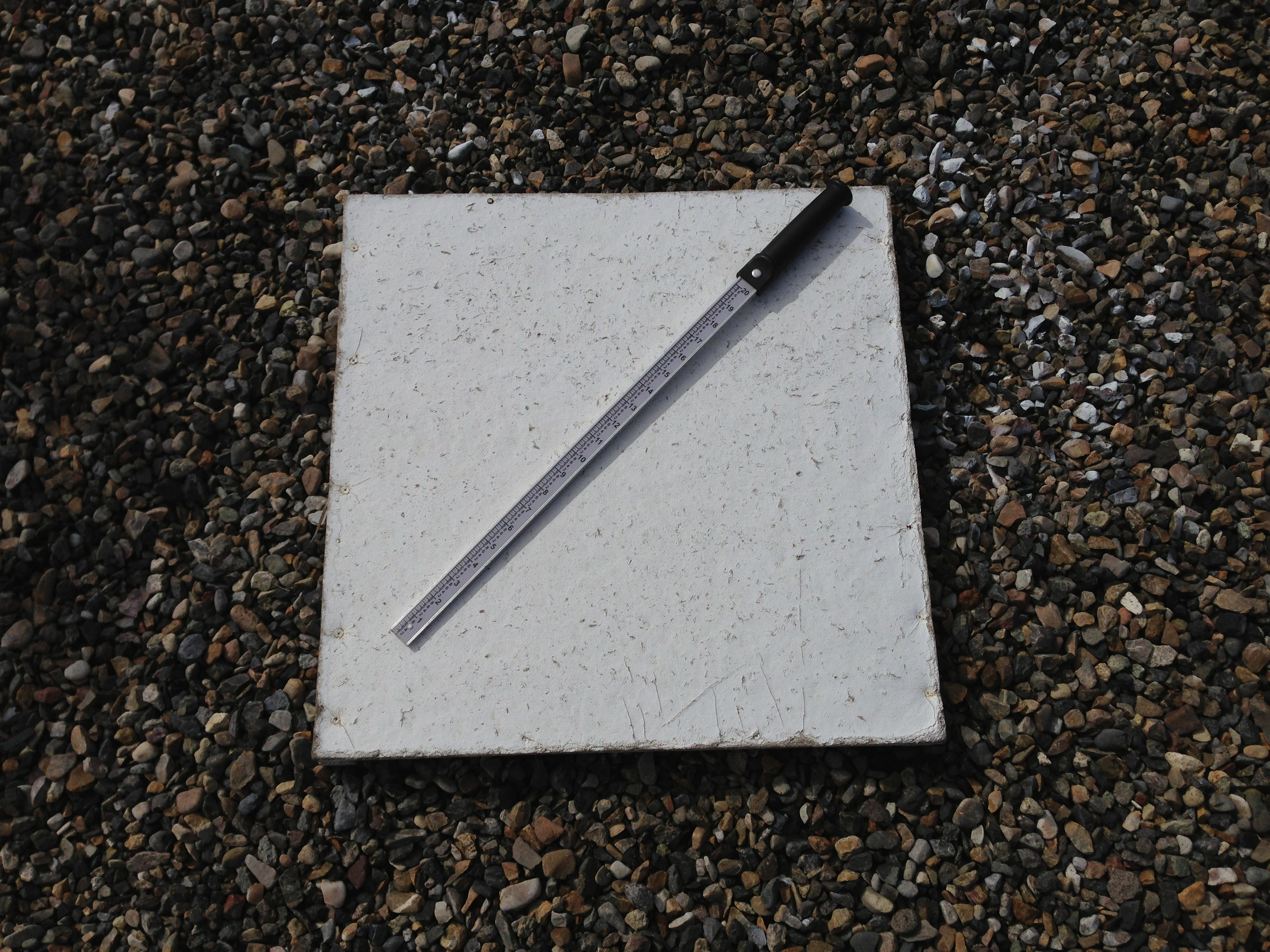
A National Weather Service snowboard and snow-measuring stick

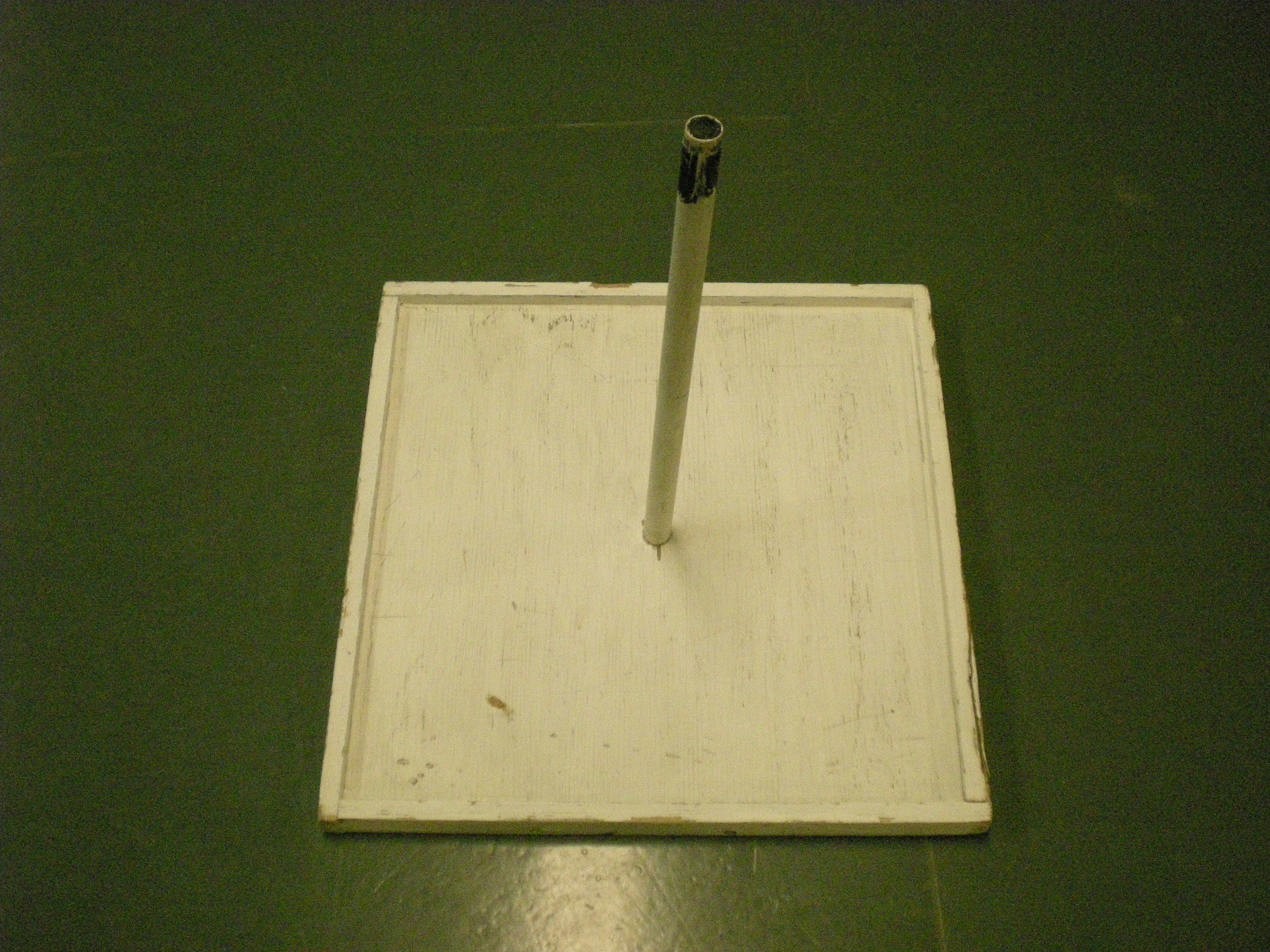
A MSC-approved weaverboard. The board is 42.5 cm (16.7 in) square and 2 cm (0.79 in) high. The lip extends 1 cm (0.39 in) above the actual board. The stick is 38.5 cm (15.2 in) high.

A snowboard (US) or weaverboard (Canada) is a meteorological tool used to aid in the obtaining of accurate measurement of snow accumulation.

== Specifications ==
Snowboards are typically flat pieces of plywood painted a light color (most commonly white), around 16 to 24 in (41 to 61 cm) in length and width and around 0.5 to 0.75 in (1.3 to 1.9 cm) thick. In addition, the weaverboard used in Canada has a white stick with a black tip placed in the centre. This allows the board to be found if the newly fallen snow was to completely cover the board.

== Reasons for use ==
When measuring snow in grass, the blades will produce inflated snow totals, whereas with a snowboard, this effect is absent. The light or white color of a snowboard serves to minimize heating by sunlight, which often occurs on paved surfaces. These qualities make snowfall measurement using a snowboard more accurate than measurements without one.

== Usage ==
Snowboards should be placed at ground level at a distance away from a building of at least two times the height of that building. When measuring snowfall on a snowboard, the snowfall is measured to the nearest 0.1 in (0.25 cm). The snow may be measured as often as necessary during a 6-hour period in order to record the greatest depth on the board, since snow may both accumulate and melt during the same 6-hour period. All snow is cleaned from the snowboard once every 6 hours. At the end of the snow event, the maximum depths recorded on the snowboard during each 6-hour period are summed to provide the storm total; the same measurements during a single day are summed to produce the daily snowfall total.

Usage in Canada is similar to that of the United States, with some minor differences. The board is checked every 6 hours at the synoptic hours of 12Z, 18Z, 00Z and 06Z. The depth of snow on the board should be checked in several different places and an average depth obtained rounded to the nearest 0.2 cm (0.08 in).

== See also ==
- Snow pillow
