= Disdrometer =

Instrument used for rain drop size and velocity measurement

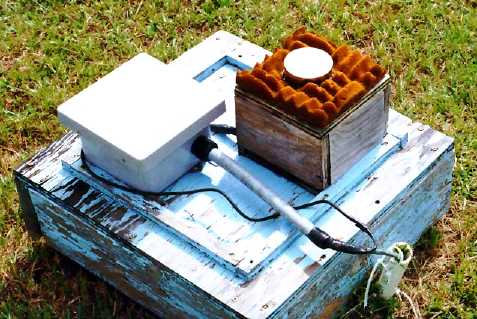
A disdrometer in place in the Everglades

A disdrometer is an instrument used to measure the drop size distribution and velocity of falling hydrometeors. Some disdrometers can distinguish between rain, graupel, and hail.

The uses for disdrometers are numerous. They can be used for traffic control, scientific examination, airport observation systems, and hydrology. The latest disdrometers employ microwave or laser technologies. 2D video disdrometers can be used to analyze individual raindrops and snowflakes.

== See also ==
- Rain gauge
- Snow gauge
