= Rain gauge =

Instrument for measuring liquid precipitation

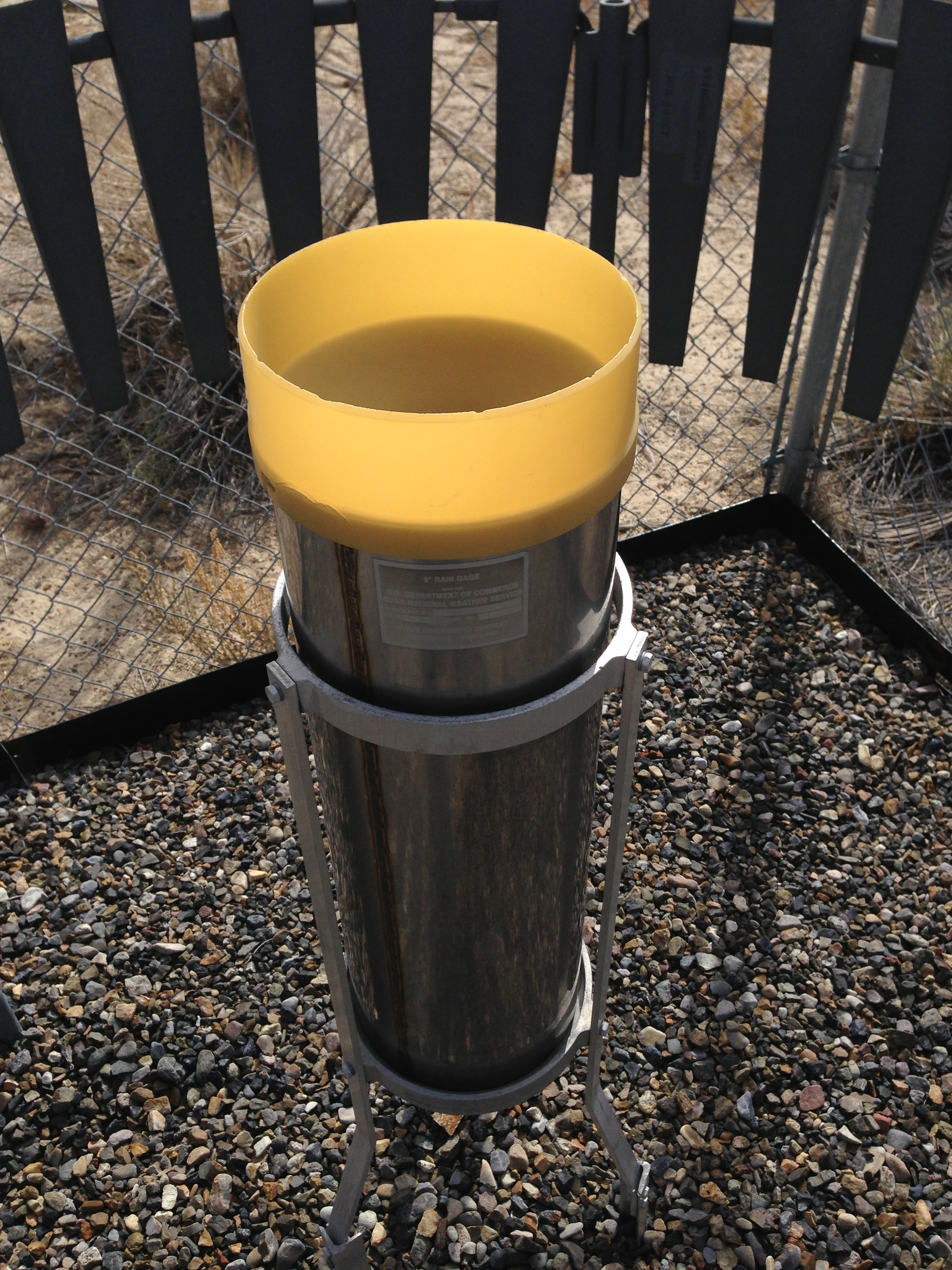
Standard National Oceanic and Atmospheric Administration rain gauge

A rain gauge (also known as udometer, ombrometer, pluviometer and hyetometer) is an instrument used by meteorologists and hydrologists to gather and measure the amount of liquid precipitation in a predefined area, over a set period of time. It is used to determine the depth of precipitation (usually in mm) that occurs over a unit area and measure rainfall amount.

== History ==
People living in India and the Ancient Greeks began to record rainfall around 400 to 500 BCE. In India the readings were correlated against expected growth. In the Arthashastra, used for example in Magadha, precise standards were set as to grain production. Each state storehouse was equipped with a rain gauge to classify land for taxation purposes. Rainfall measurement was also mentioned in the Jewish text in Palestine. In 1247, the Song Chinese mathematician and inventor Qin Jiushao invented Tianchi basin rain and snow gauges to reference rain, and snowfall measurements, as well as other forms of meteorological data.

In 1441, the Cheugugi was invented during the reign of Sejong the Great of the Joseon dynasty of Korea as the first standardized rain gauge. In 1662, Christopher Wren created the first tipping-bucket rain gauge in Britain in collaboration with Robert Hooke. Hooke also designed a manual gauge with a funnel that made measurements throughout 1695.

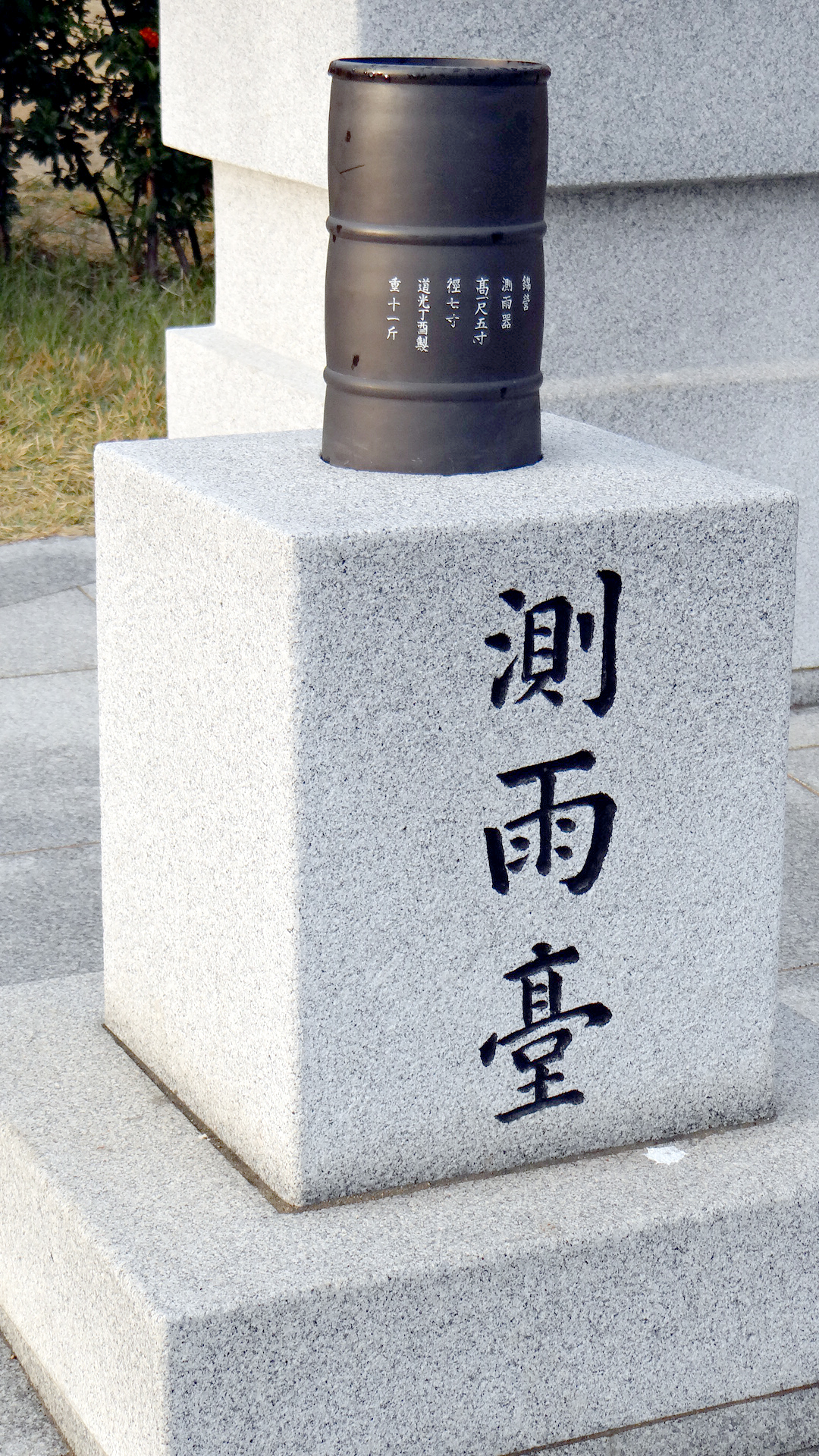
A Cheugugi at Jang Yeong-sil Science Garden in Busan

Richard Towneley was the first to make systematic rainfall measurements over a period of 15 years from 1677 to 1694, publishing his records in the Philosophical Transactions of the Royal Society. Towneley called for more measurements elsewhere in the country to compare the rainfall in different regions, although only William Derham appears to have taken up Towneley's challenge. They jointly published the rainfall measurements for Towneley Park and Upminster in Essex for the years 1697 to 1704.

The naturalist Gilbert White took measurements to determine the mean rainfall from 1779 to 1786, although it was his brother-in-law, Thomas Barker, who made regular and meticulous measurements for 59 years, recording temperature, wind, barometric pressure, rainfall and clouds. His meteorological records are a valuable resource for knowledge of the 18th-century British climate. He was able to demonstrate that the average rainfall varied greatly from year to year with little discernible pattern.

=== National coverage and modern gauges ===
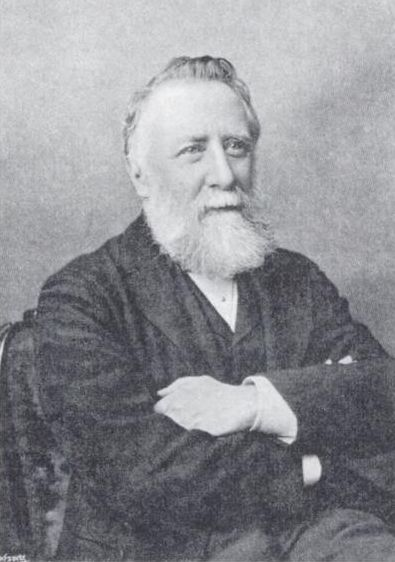
Symons in 1900

The meteorologist George James Symons published the first annual volume of British Rainfall in 1860. This pioneering work contained rainfall records from 168 land stations in England and Wales. He was elected to the council of the British Meteorological Society in 1863 and made it his life's work to investigate rainfall within the British Isles. He set up a voluntary network of observers, who collected data which were returned to him for analysis. So successful was he in this endeavour that by 1866 he was able to show results that gave a fair representation of the distribution of rainfall and the number of recorders gradually increased until the last volume of British Rainfall which he lived to edit, for 1899, contained figures from 3,528 stations — 2,894 in England and Wales, 446 in Scotland, and 188 in Ireland. He also collected old rainfall records going back over a hundred years. In 1870 he produced an account of rainfall in the British Isles starting in 1725.

Due to the ever-increasing numbers of observers, standardisation of the gauges became necessary. Symons began experimenting with new gauges in his own garden. He tried different models with variations in size, shape, and height. In 1863 he began a collaboration with Michael Foster Ward from Calne, Wiltshire, who undertook more extensive investigations. By including Ward and various others around Britain, the investigations continued until 1890. The experiments were remarkable for their planning, execution, and drawing of conclusions. The results of these experiments led to the progressive adoption of the well-known standard gauge, still used by the UK Meteorological Office today, namely, one made of "... copper, with a five-inch funnel having its brass rim one foot above the ground ..."

Most modern rain gauges generally measure the precipitation in millimetres in height collected during a certain period, equivalent to litres per square metre. Previously rain was recorded as inches or points, where one point is equal to 0.254 mm or 0.01 of an inch.

Rain gauge amounts are read either manually or by automatic weather station (AWS). The frequency of readings will depend on the requirements of the collection agency. Some countries will supplement the paid weather observer with a network of volunteers to obtain precipitation data (and other types of weather) for sparsely populated areas.

In most cases the precipitation is not retained, but some stations do submit rainfall and snowfall for testing, which is done to obtain levels of pollutants.

Rain gauges have their limitations. Attempting to collect rain data in a tropical cyclone can be nearly impossible and unreliable (even if the equipment survives) due to wind extremes. Also, rain gauges only indicate rainfall in a localized area. For virtually any gauge, drops will stick to the sides or funnel of the collecting device, such that amounts are very slightly underestimated, and those of .01 inches or .25 mm may be recorded as a "trace".

Another problem encountered is when the temperature is close to or below freezing. Rain may fall on the funnel and ice or snow may collect in the gauge, blocking subsequent rain. To alleviate this, a gauge may be equipped with an automatic electric heater to keep its moisture-collecting surfaces and sensor slightly above freezing.

Rain gauges should be placed in an open area where there are no buildings, trees, or other obstacles to block the rain. This is also to prevent the water collected on the roofs of buildings or the leaves of trees from dripping into the rain gauge after a rain, resulting in inaccurate readings. Rain gauges can help people comprehend the amount of precipitation fallen down in a certain period of time.

== Types ==
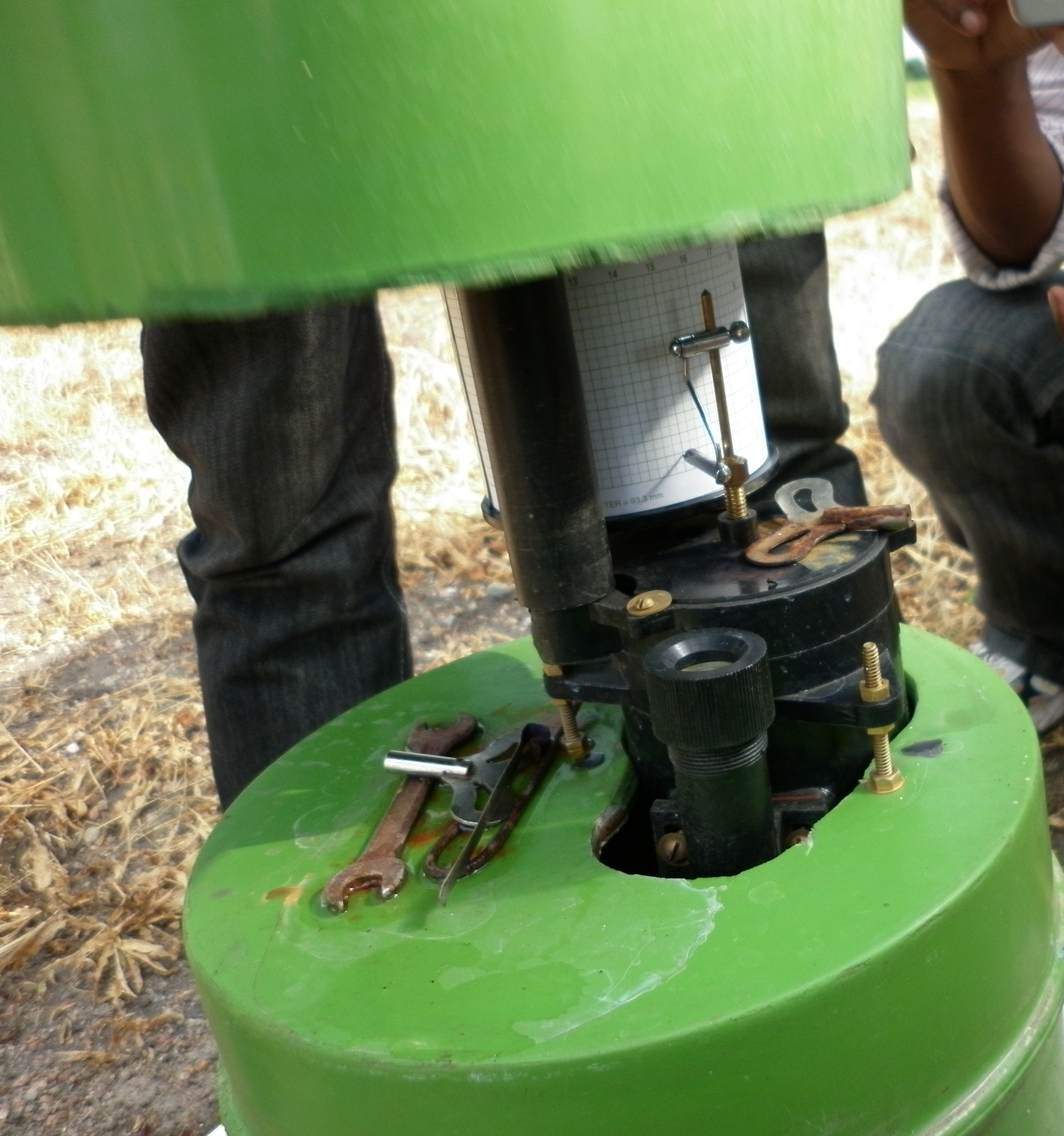
A self-recording rain gauge (interior)

Types of rain gauges include graduated cylinders, weighing gauges, tipping bucket gauges, and simply buried pit collectors. Each type has its advantages and disadvantages while collecting rain data.

=== U.S. standard rain gauge ===
The standard United States National Weather Service rain gauge, developed at the start of the 20th century, consists of an 8 in (200 mm) funnel emptying into a metal graduated cylinder, 2.525 in (64.1 mm) in diameter, which fits inside a larger container that is 8 in (200 mm) in diameter and 20 in (510 mm) tall. If the rainwater overflows the graduated inner cylinder, then the larger outer container will catch it. When measurements are taken, then the height of the water in the small graduated cylinder is measured, and the excess overflow in the large container is carefully poured into another graduated cylinder and measured to give the total rainfall. A cone meter is sometimes used to prevent leakage that can result in alteration of the data. In locations using the metric system, the cylinder is usually marked in mm and will measure up to 250 mm (9.8 in) of rainfall.

Each horizontal line on the cylinder is 0.5 mm (0.02 in). In designs made for areas using Imperial units, each horizontal line represents 0.01 in (0.25 mm) inches.

=== Pluviometer of intensities ===
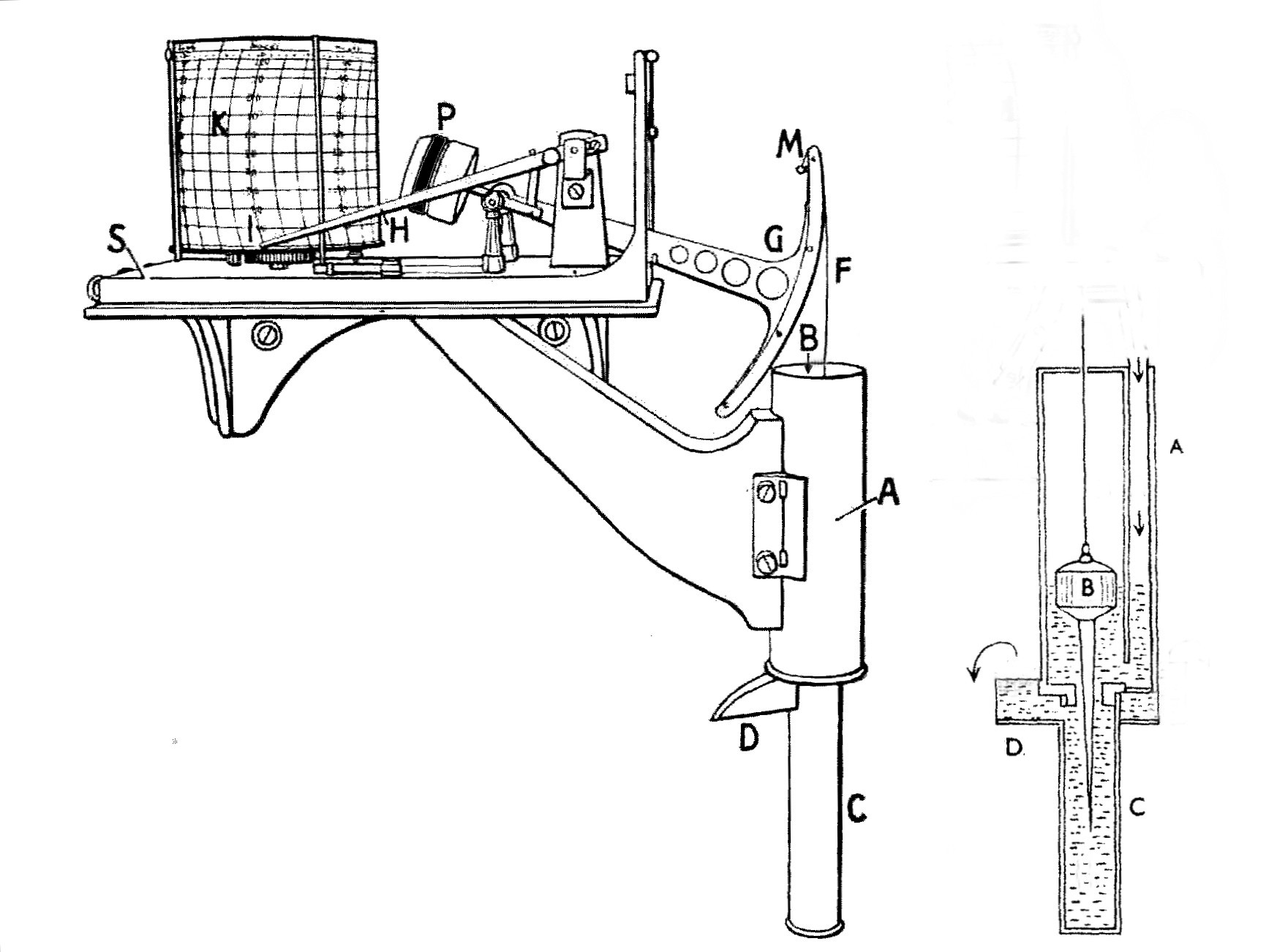
Pluviometer of intensities (1921)

The pluviometer of intensities (or Jardi's pluviometer) is a tool that measures the average intensity of rainfall in a certain interval of time. It was initially designed to record the rainfall regime in Catalonia but eventually spread throughout the world.

It employs the principle of feedback ... the incoming water pushes the buoy upwards, making the lower "adjusting conic needle" to let pass the same amount of water that enters into the container, this way ... the needle records on the drum the amount of water flowing through it at every moment—in mm of rainfall per square meter.

It consists of a rotating drum that rotates at constant speed, this drum drags a graduated sheet of cardboard, which has the time at the abscissa while the y-axis indicates the height of rainfall in mm of rain. This height is recorded with a pen that moves vertically, driven by a buoy, marking on the paper the rainfall over time. Each cardboard sheet is usually used for one day.

As the rain falls, the water collected by the funnel falls into the container and raises the buoy that makes the pen arm rise in the vertical axis, marking the cardboard accordingly. If the rainfall does not vary, the water level in the container remains constant, and while the drum rotates, the pen's mark is more or less a horizontal line, proportional to the amount of water that has fallen. When the pen reaches the top edge of the recording paper, it means that the buoy is "up high in the tank" leaving the tip of the conical needle in a way that uncovers the regulating hole, i.e., the maximum flow that the apparatus is able to record. If the rain suddenly decreases, making the container (as it empties) quickly lower the buoy, that movement corresponds to a steep slope line that can reach the bottom of the recorded cardboard if it stops raining.

The rain gauge of intensities allowed precipitation to be recorded over many years, particularly in Barcelona (95 years), apart from many other places around the world, such as Hong Kong.

=== Weighing precipitation gauge ===
A weighing-type precipitation gauge consists of a storage bin, which is weighed to record the mass. Certain models measure the mass using a pen on a rotating drum, or by using a vibrating wire attached to a data logger. The advantages of this type of gauge over tipping buckets are that it does not underestimate intense rain, and it can measure other forms of precipitation, including rain, hail, and snow. These gauges are, however, more expensive and require more maintenance than tipping bucket gauges.

The weighing-type recording gauge may also contain a device to measure the number of chemicals contained in the location's atmosphere. This is extremely helpful for scientists studying the effects of greenhouse gases released into the atmosphere and their effects on the levels of the acid rain. Some Automated Surface Observing System (ASOS) units use an automated weighing gauge called the AWPAG (All Weather Precipitation Accumulation Gauge).

=== Tipping bucket rain gauge ===
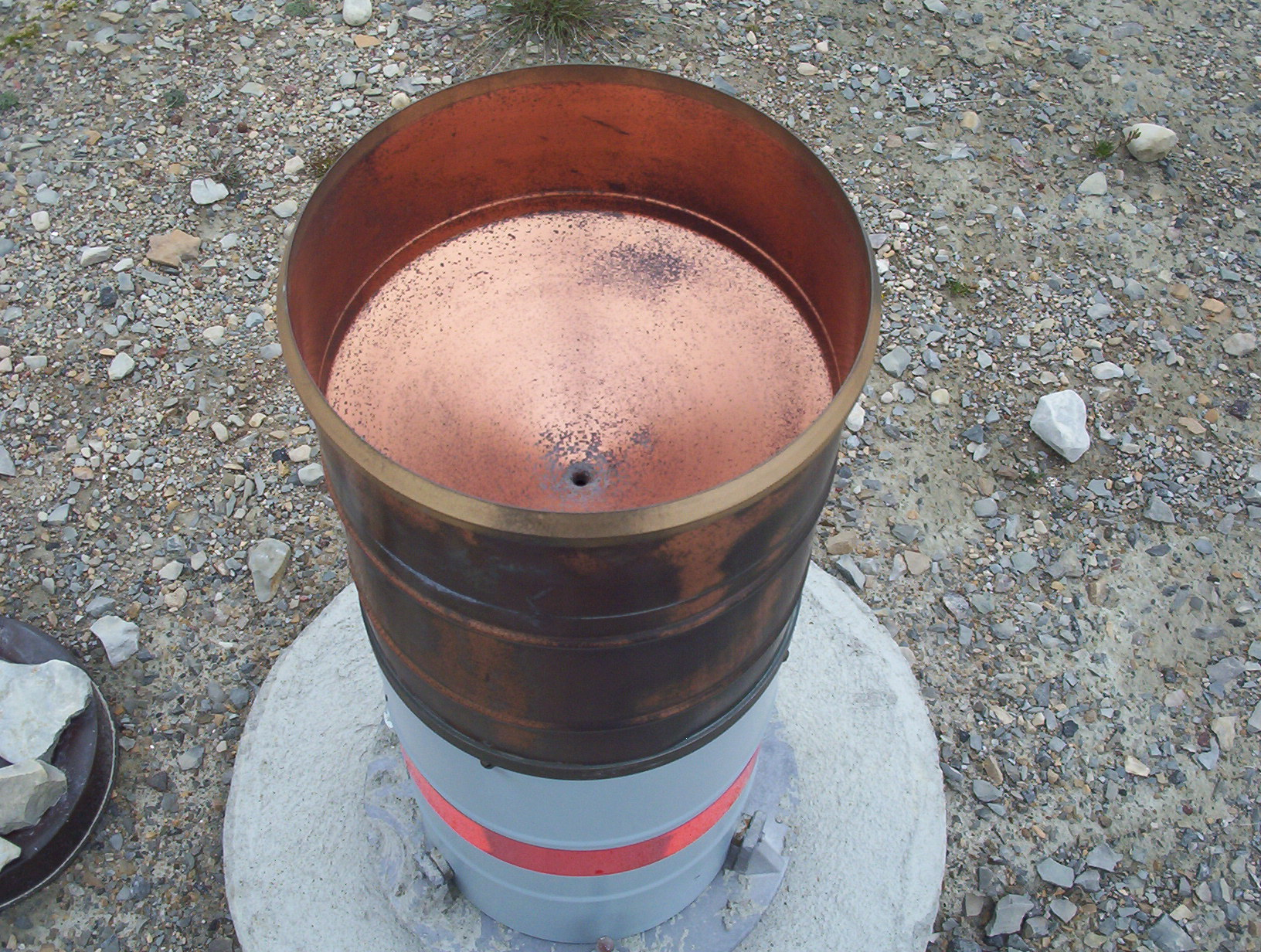
The exterior of a tipping bucket rain gauge

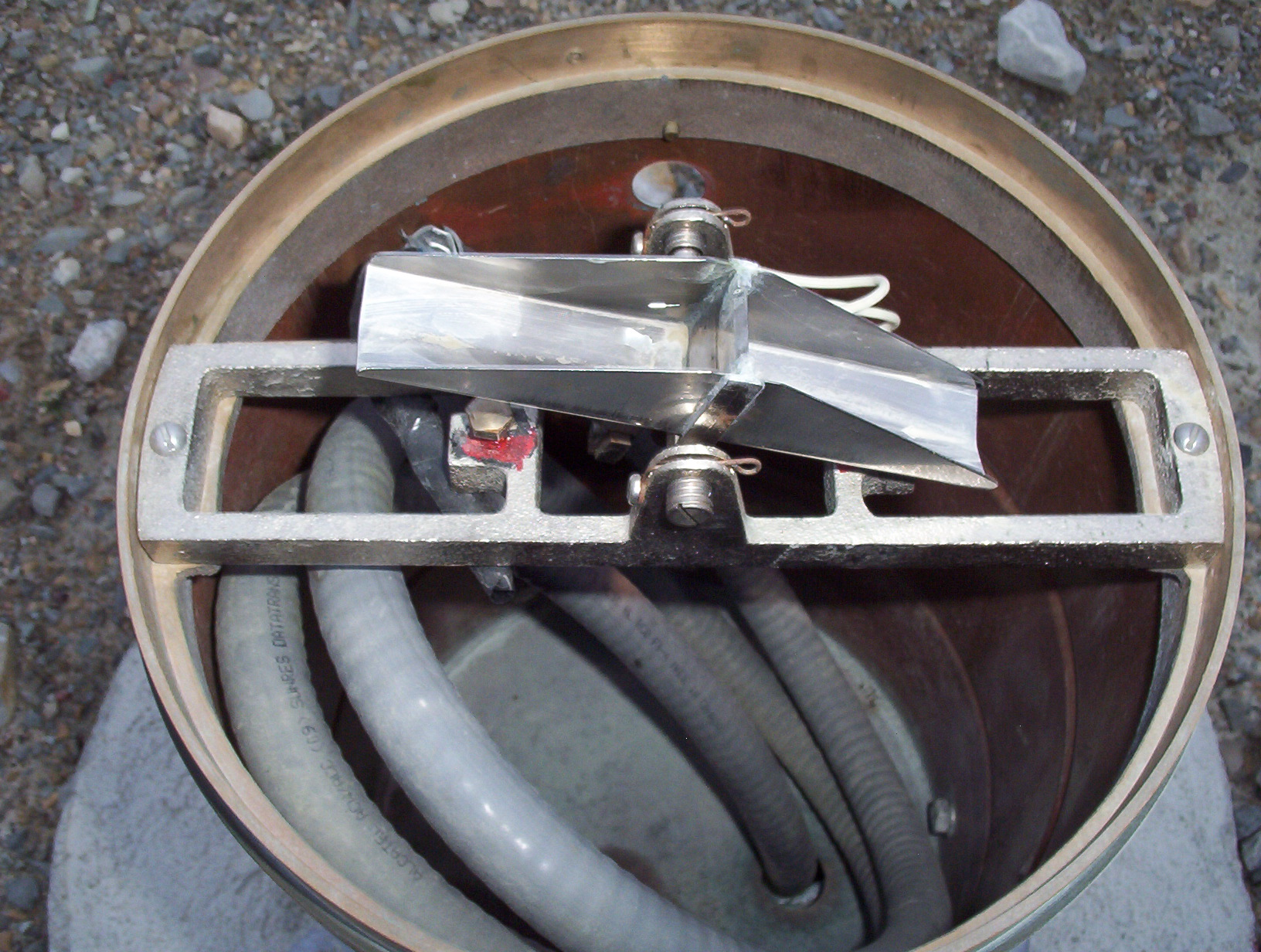
The interior of a tipping bucket rain gauge

The tipping bucket rain gauge consists of a funnel that collects and channels the precipitation into a small seesaw-like container. After a pre-set amount of precipitation falls, the lever tips, dumping the collected water and sending an electrical signal. An old-style recording device may consist of a pen mounted on an arm attached to a geared wheel that moves once with each signal sent from the collector. In this design, as the wheel turns the pen arm moves either up or down leaving a trace on the graph and at the same time making a loud "click".

The tipping bucket rain gauge is not as accurate as the standard rain gauge, because the rainfall may stop before the lever has tipped. When the next period of rain begins it may take no more than one or two drops to tip the lever. This would then indicate that a pre-set amount has fallen when only a fraction of that amount has actually fallen. Tipping buckets also tend to underestimate the amount of rainfall, particularly in snowfall and heavy rainfall events. The advantage of the tipping bucket rain gauge is that the character of the rain (light, medium, or heavy) may be easily obtained. Rainfall character is decided by the total amount of rain that has fallen in a set period (usually 1 hour) by counting the number of pulses during that period. Algorithms may be applied to the data as a method of correcting the data for high-intensity rainfall.

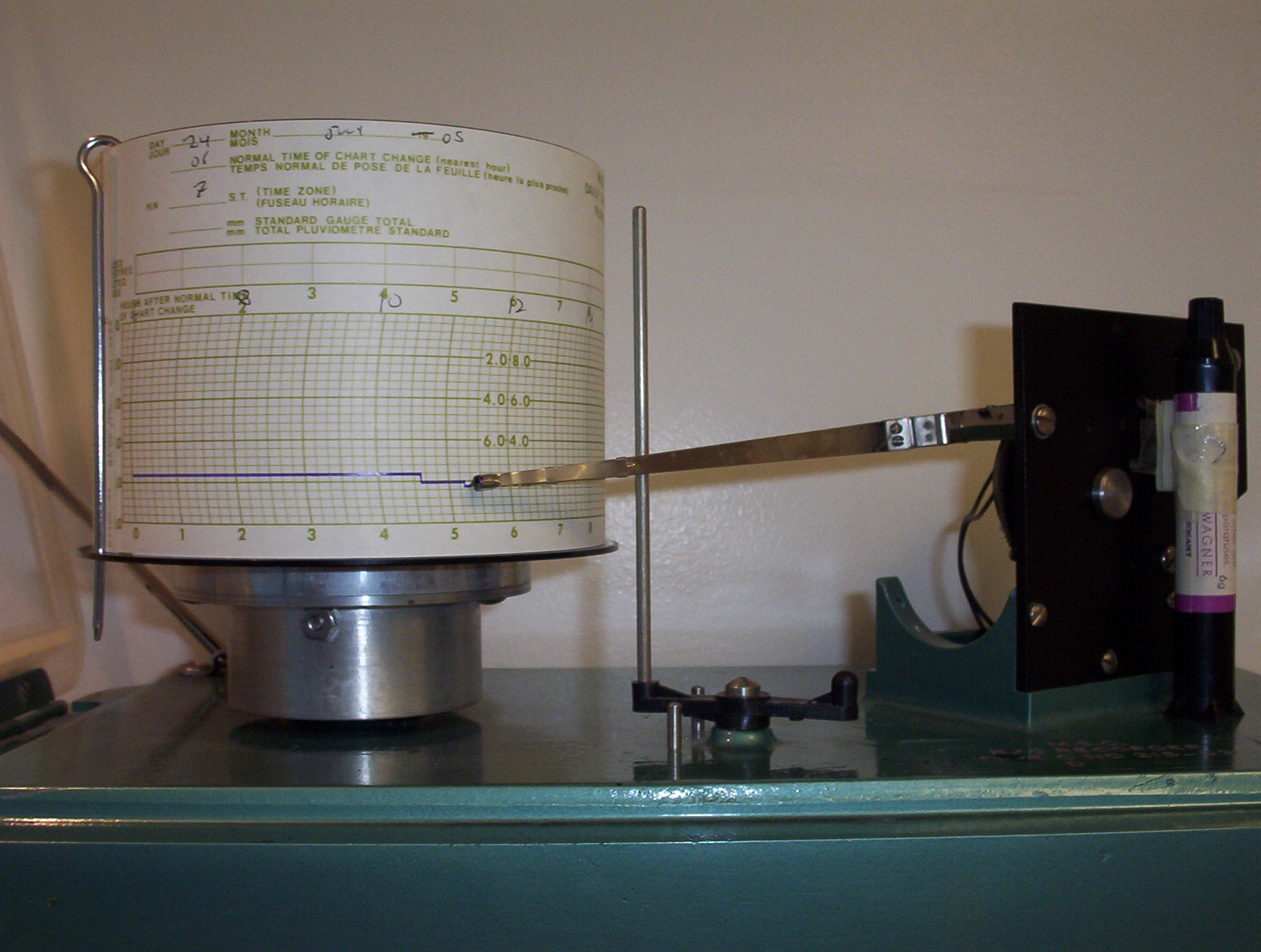
Tipping bucket rain gauge recorder

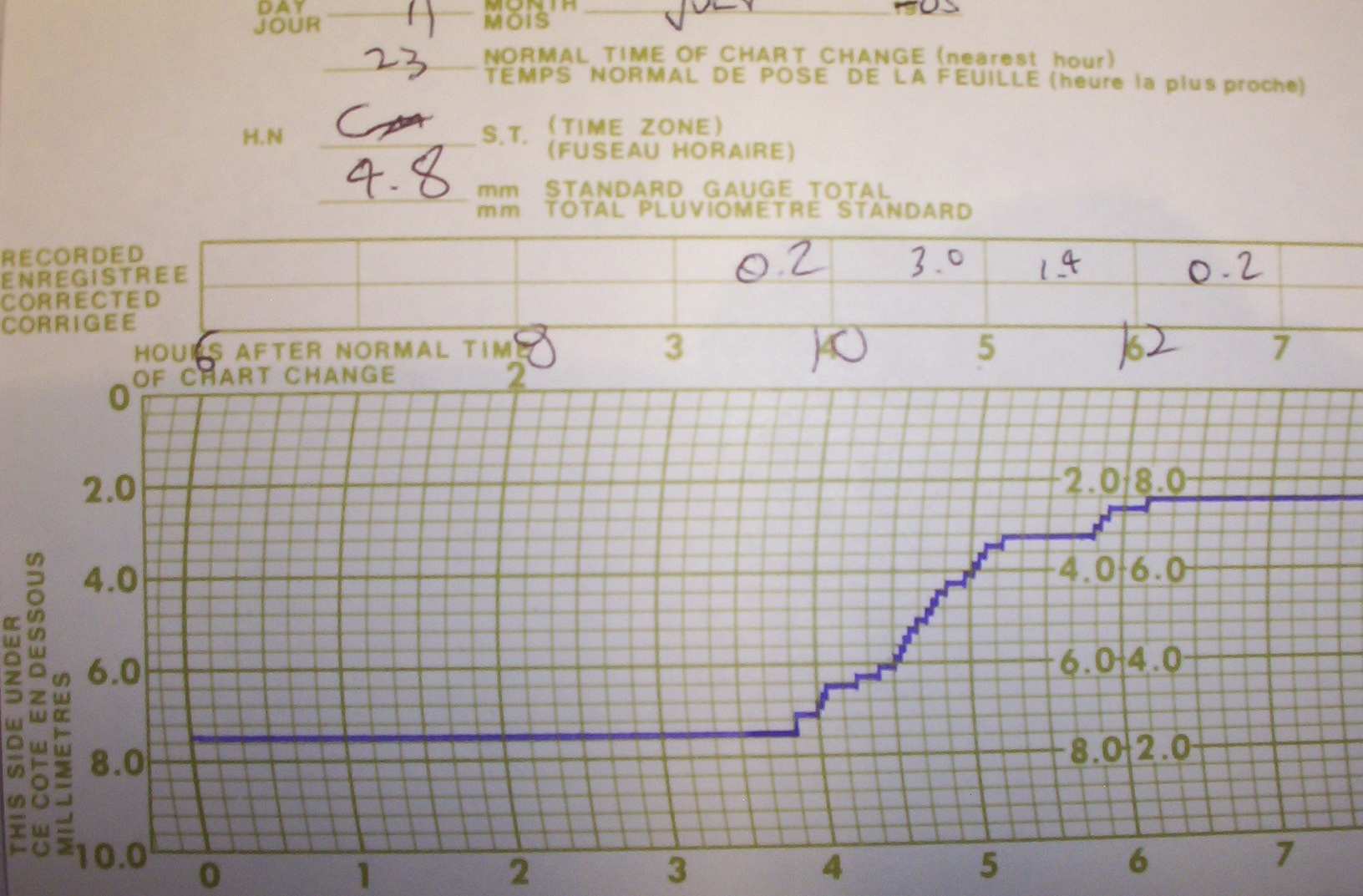
Closeup of a tipping bucket rain gauge recorder chart

Modern tipping rain gauges consist of a plastic collector balanced over a pivot. When it tips, it actuates a switch (such as a reed switch) which is then electronically recorded or transmitted to a remote collection station.

Tipping gauges can also incorporate elements of weighing gauges whereby a strain gauge is fixed to the collection bucket so that the exact rainfall can be read at any moment. Each time the collector tips, the strain gauge (weight sensor) is re-zeroed to null out any drift.

To measure the water equivalent of frozen precipitation, a tipping bucket may be heated to melt any ice and snow that is caught in its funnel. Without a heating mechanism, the funnel often becomes clogged during a frozen precipitation event, and thus no precipitation can be measured. Many Automated Surface Observing System (ASOS) units use heated tipping buckets to measure precipitation.

=== Optical rain gauge ===
This type of gauge has a row of collection funnels. In an enclosed space below each is a laser diode and a photo transistor detector. When enough water is collected to make a single drop, it drops from the bottom, falling into the laser beam path. The sensor is set at right angles to the laser so that enough light is scattered to be detected as a sudden flash of lights. The flashes from these photodetectors are then read and transmitted or recorded. Different type of optical range gauges have been used throughout the decades. The technology has also improved.

=== Acoustic rain gauge ===
Acoustic disdrometers, also referred to as hydrophones, are able to sense the sound signatures for each drop size as rain strikes a water surface within the gauge. Since each sound signature is unique, it is possible to invert the underwater sound field to estimate the drop-size distribution within the rain. Selected moments of the drop-size distribution yield rainfall rate, rainfall accumulation, and other rainfall properties.

== See also ==
- Deposit gauge
- Disdrometer
