= Spokane Airport =

Spokane Airport may refer to:

- Spokane International Airport, international airport
- Felts Field, public use airport
