= ELN =

ELN may refer to:

== Paramilitary ==
- National Liberation Army (Colombia) (Spanish: Ejército de Liberación Nacional), involved in the continuing Colombian armed conflict
- Ñancahuazú Guerrilla, a guerilla group active in the Cordillera Province, Bolivia from 1966 to 1967
- National Liberation Army (Peru) (Spanish: Ejército de Liberación Nacional), a guerilla group active in 1965

== Science ==
- ELN (gene), coding for Elastin
- Electronic lab notebook

== Other uses ==
- Bowers Airport, serving Ellensburg, Washington, United States
- East Lothian, historic county in Scotland, Chapman code
- Élan, an Irish pharmaceutical company
- Equity-linked note, a financial instrument
- European Leadership Network, a European think-tank
- Emerging Leaders Network, a program of Toronto-based CivicAction
