= Boeing Field =

Public airport in Seattle, Washington, United States

King County International Airport "Boeing Field"
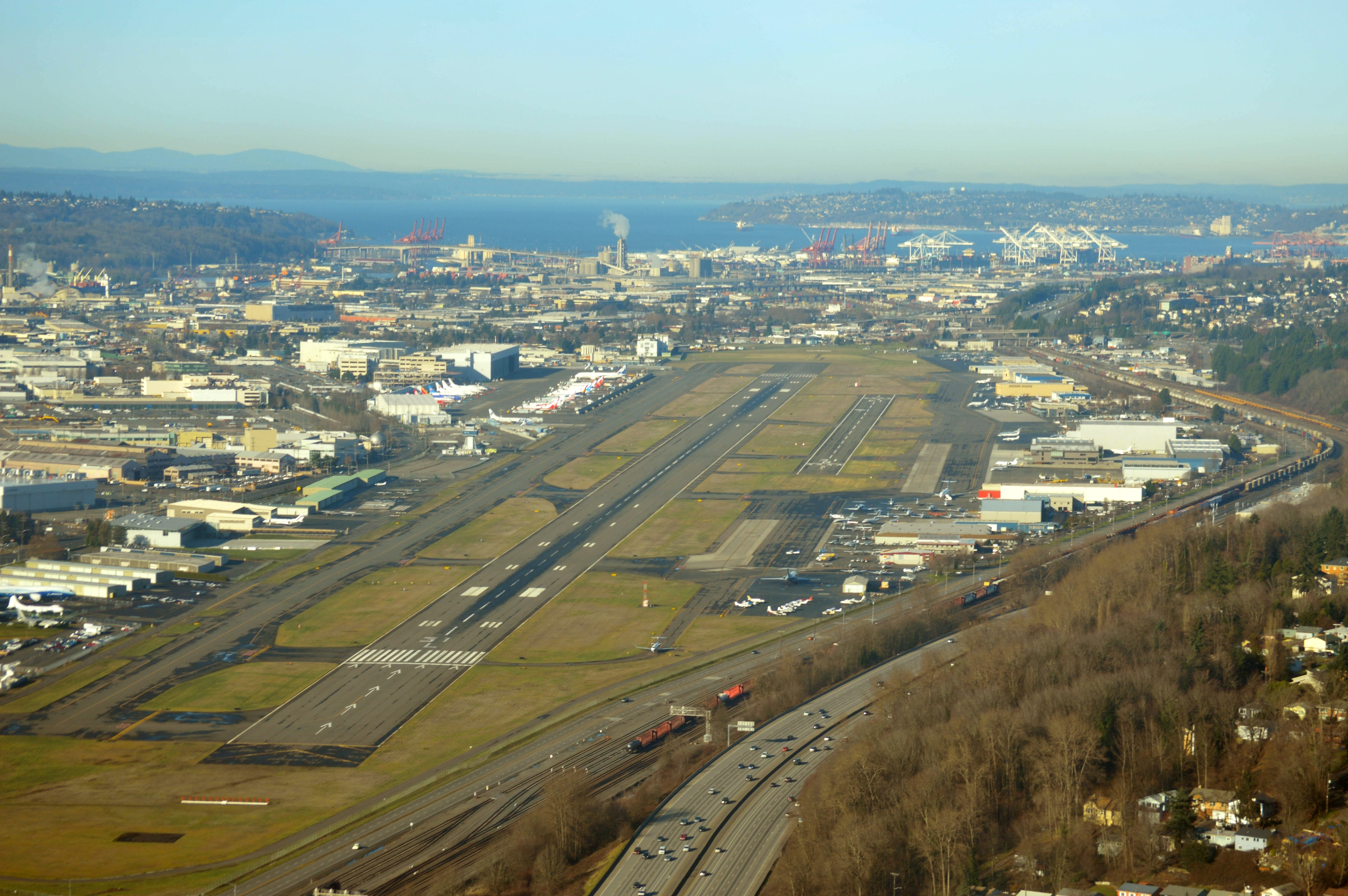
- An aerial shot of the airport
- IATA: BFI; ICAO: KBFI; FAA LID: BFI

Summary
- Airport type: Public
- Owner/Operator: King County
- Serves: Seattle metropolitan area
- Location: Seattle / Tukwila, King County, Washington, U.S.
- Hub for: UPS Airlines; SeaPort Airlines
- Elevation AMSL: 21 ft (6.4 m)
- Coordinates: 47°31′48″N 122°18′07″W
- Website: kingcounty.gov/airport

Maps
- FAA diagram
- Interactive map of King County International Airport "Boeing Field"

Runways
Direction	Length		Surface
Direction	ft	m	Surface
14R/32L	10,007	3,050	Asphalt
14L/32R	3,709	1,131	Asphalt

Statistics (2018)
- Aircraft operations: 183,268
- Based aircraft: 384
- Source: Federal Aviation Administration

King County International Airport (IATA: BFI, ICAO: KBFI, FAA LID: BFI), commonly known as Boeing Field, is a public airport owned and operated by King County, 5 mi (8.0 km) south of downtown Seattle, in the U.S. state of Washington. The airport is sometimes referred to as KCIA (King County International Airport), but it is not the airport identifier. The airport has scheduled passenger service operated by Kenmore Air, a commuter air carrier, and was being served by JSX with regional jet flights. It is also a hub for UPS Airlines. It is also used by other cargo airlines and general aviation aircraft. The airfield is named for founder of Boeing, William E. Boeing, and was constructed in 1928, serving as the city's primary airport until the opening of Seattle–Tacoma International Airport in 1944. The airport's property is mostly in Seattle just south of Georgetown, with its southern tip extending into Tukwila. The airport covers 634 acres (257 ha), averages more than 180,000 operations annually, and has approximately 380 based aircraft.

== History ==
Aviation history in Seattle began in 1910 when Charles Hamilton performed an air show at The Meadows racetrack, located on the site of the present-day Museum of Flight. Hamilton executed diving maneuvers and staged a race between an aircraft and an automobile. After crashing and landing in a pond at the center of the track, he repaired his aircraft and resumed flying the following day.

A 1911 Seattle development plan proposed transforming the Duwamish Valley into an industrial zone. William Boeing acquired a shipbuilding facility on the western bank of the Duwamish River, where he founded Pacific Aero Products, later renamed Boeing Airplane Company. The factory manufactured 50 Boeing Model 2 training aircraft during World War I, testing them on a sandy field west of the Duwamish River. This testing ground eventually developed into King County Airport.

In 1928, King County voters approved a $950,000 plan to build the region's first municipal airport. The airport's proximity to the Boeing Airplane Company and its use by Pacific Air Transport's regular airmail service led to its naming as "Boeing Field." Construction of the runway began on March 28, 1928, using material dredged from the Duwamish River bed. At that time, the airport site was served by three railroad lines and Highway 99.

Construction of the first county-owned hangars began shortly after the airport's opening. The administration building and terminal were officially inaugurated on April 21, 1930. Boeing Field served as Seattle's sole passenger terminal throughout the 1930s, providing passenger services, flight schedule information, and meteorological data for airlines. Regular flights to Portland and San Francisco were operated by West Coast Air Transport and Pacific Air Transport. These carriers later merged to create United Airlines, which pioneered both 28-hour transcontinental service and the first flight attendant corps composed of trained nurses.

By 1935, the U.S. Bureau of Air Commerce (later Federal Aviation Administration) began investigating the construction of a new airport elsewhere in King County due to risks associated with the high ridge east of Boeing Field. In the late 1930s, as war threatened Europe, Boeing shifted to round-the-clock operations, intensifying production of B-17 and B-29 bombers, which became crucial support for U.S. efforts during World War II.

Galvin Airport, built in 1941 about five miles south of Boeing Field, later became the region's main passenger airport, now known as Seattle-Tacoma International Airport ("Sea-Tac"). This development changed Boeing Field's function, as it evolved into a significant regional general aviation and industrial airport. The first Boeing 707 jet airliner prototype, nicknamed "Dash 80," departed from Renton Airport and made its inaugural landing at Boeing Field in 1954, marking aviation's entry into the jet age.

A new control tower was constructed at the airport in 1962, though regular airline service from Boeing Field ceased in 1971. In 1981, the Airpark hangar complex was built to accommodate 20 business jets. The Seattle Museum of Flight opened in 1987. An expansion of the Airpark hangar complex in 1988 added 16 more spaces.

The August 1946 OAG lists 24 United Airlines weekday departures, 10 weekly flights on Northwest Airlines and several Pan Am Douglas DC-3s a week to Juneau via Annette Island Airport which was the airfield serving Ketchikan at the time. Northwest moved to SEA in 1947, United moved in 1949, and Pan Am in 1953. West Coast Airlines was operating scheduled passenger Douglas DC-3 service from the airport by November 1946 and served Boeing Field for many years. West Coast successors Air West followed by Hughes Airwest operated scheduled passenger flights including McDonnell Douglas DC-9-30 jet service until 1971 when Hughes Airwest moved its service to Seattle-Tacoma International Airport. West Coast began operating Douglas DC-9-10 jet service from Boeing Field in 1968.

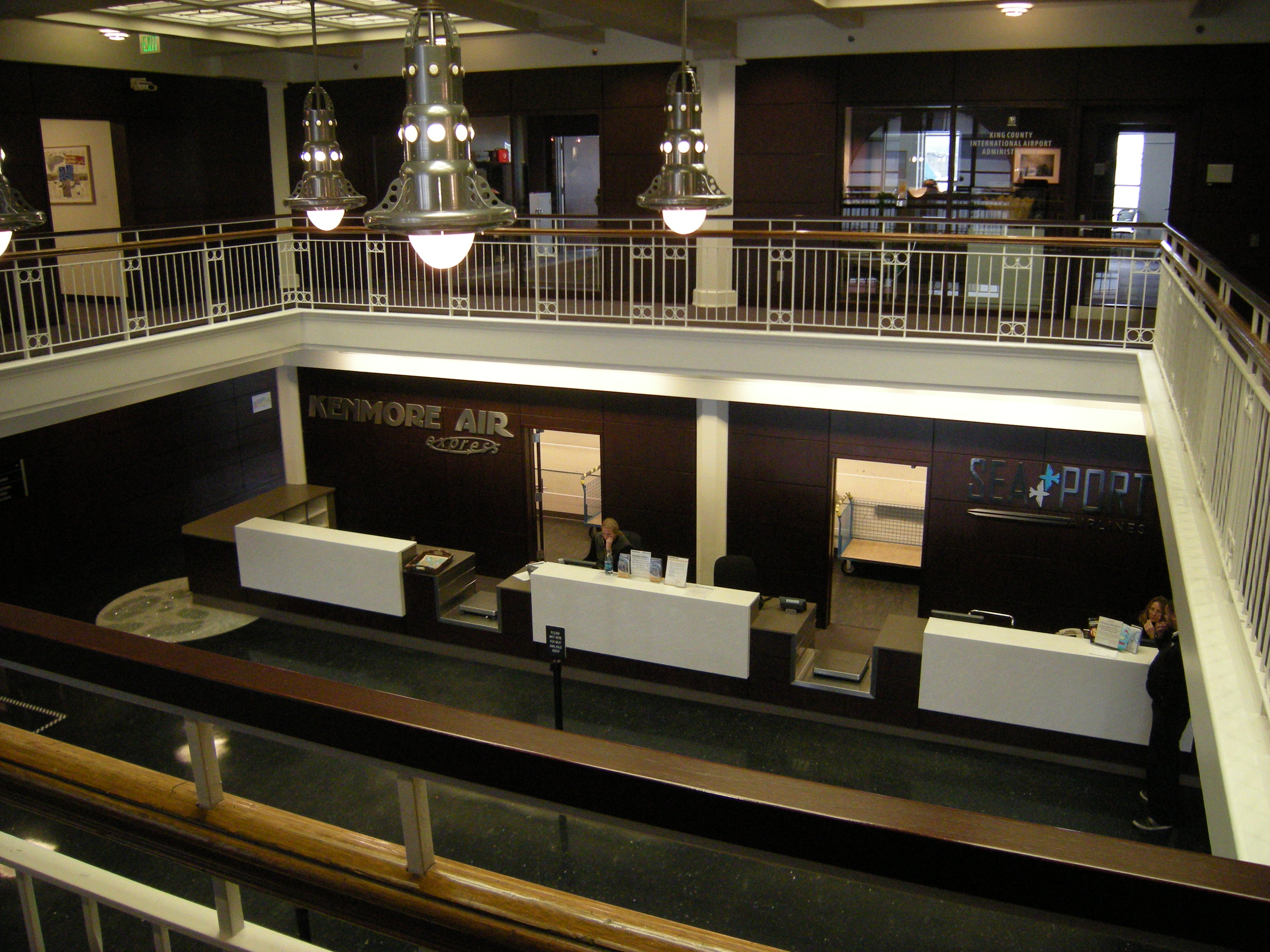
Boeing Field terminal interior, showing the ticket counters of Kenmore Air and SeaPort Airlines, before the latter discontinued service to the airport in 2012

Boeing Field has one passenger airline, Kenmore Air with daily flights to Friday Harbor and Eastsound/Orcas Island. Before 2019, the last scheduled passenger jets were operated by Hughes Airwest with McDonnell Douglas DC-9-30s in 1971. A proposal by Southwest Airlines in June 2005 was submitted to King County to relocate from Seattle-Tacoma International Airport to Boeing Field, but was rejected by King County Executive Ron Sims in October. A similar proposal by Alaska Airlines (a response to the Southwest proposal) was also rejected. Southwest Airlines said it wanted to avoid the heavy fees at Sea-Tac due to its expansion program.

The transfer of ownership of Boeing Field from King County to the Port of Seattle was proposed in 2007 as part of a land swap with land owned by the Port. Boeing Field is planned to handle more cargo traffic, including "overflow" from nearby Sea-Tac, as part of its long-range plans.

The National Plan of Integrated Airport Systems for 2011–2015 called it a primary commercial service airport. Federal Aviation Administration records say the airport had 34,597 passenger boardings (enplanements) in calendar year 2008, 35,863 in 2009 and 33,656 in 2010.

== Facilities ==
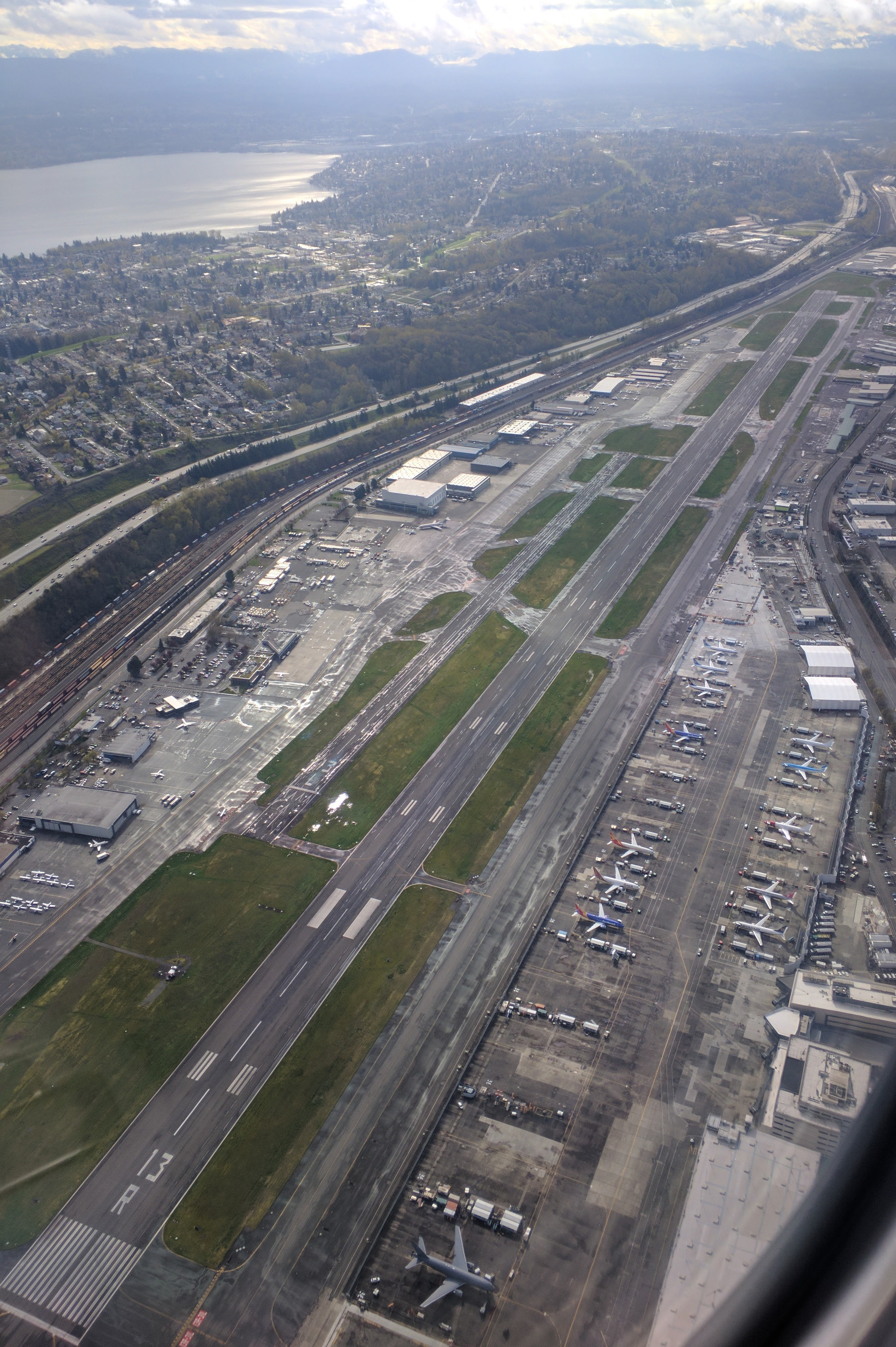
Boeing Field aerial from the northwest

The airport covers 634 acres (257 ha) at an elevation of 21 feet (6 m). It has two asphalt runways: 14R/32L is 10,007 by 200 feet (3,050 x 61 m) and 14L/32R is 3,709 by 100 feet (1,131 x 30 m).

In the year ending January 1, 2019 the airport had 183,268 aircraft operations, average 502 per day: 79% general aviation, 15% air taxi, 6% airline, and <1% military. 384 aircraft were then based at this airport: 229 single-engine, 40 multi-engine, 88 jet, 26 helicopter, and 1 glider.

The runway numbers were updated from 13/31 to 14/32 in August 2017, due to shifting magnetic headings.

=== General aviation ===
In addition to tie-down parking areas and hangars for general aviation aircraft, the airport is home for several fixed-base operators (FBOs) including Skyservice, Modern Aviation, and Signature Flight Support. Executive Flight Maintenance provides maintenance services. Airlift Northwest operates emergency medical services (EMS) and on-demand helicopter flights.

=== Boeing Company ===
The Boeing Company has facilities at the airport. Final preparations for delivery of Boeing 737 aircraft after the first test flight are made at Boeing Field. Boeing facilities at the airport have also included a paint hangar and flight test facilities. The initial assembly of the 737 was at Boeing Field in the 1960s because the factory in Renton was at capacity building the Boeing 707 and Boeing 727. After 271 aircraft, production moved to Renton in late 1970.

=== Museum of Flight ===
The Museum of Flight is on the southwest corner of the field. Among the aircraft on display is the first Boeing 747, the third Boeing 787, and an ex-British Airways Concorde, lent to the museum from BA, a supersonic airliner that landed at Boeing Field on its first visit to Seattle on November 15, 1984. Aircraft on the airfield can be seen from the museum.

=== Police and fire response ===
The King County International Airport contracts with the King County Sheriff's Office for police services. Deputies assigned to the airport wear a mix of both Police and Fire uniforms, turnouts etc., which includes single Police, Fire/ARFF patch, and drive King County International Airport Police patrol cars. There are currently 17 patrol officers/sergeants and one chief assigned full-time to the airport. Officers assigned to the airport are also required to obtain a Washington State Fire Fighter One certification and an Emergency Medical Technician certification.

== Airlines and destinations ==
=== Passenger ===
Airlines	Destinations	Refs.
Kenmore Air	Eastsound, Friday Harbor, Victoria; Charter: Vancouver	
SeaPort Airlines	Portland (OR), Spokane–Felts	

=== Cargo ===
Airlines	Destinations
AirPac Airlines	Burlington/Mount Vernon, Everett, Eugene, Port Angeles, Portland (OR), Sacramento–Executive, Spokane, Spokane–Felts, Yakima
Ameriflight	Bellingham, Burlington/Mount Vernon, Everett, Ketchikan, Lewiston, Moses Lake, Olympia, Omak, Portland (OR), Spokane, Tacoma, Tri-Cities (WA), Walla Walla, Wenatchee, Yakima
SkyLink Express	Vancouver
UPS Airlines	Anchorage, Chicago/Rockford, Denver, Fargo, Louisville, Ontario, Portland (OR), Spokane, Vancouver
Western Air Express	Portland (OR)

=== Previous airline service ===
In 1945, Northwest Airlines was operating all flights from the airport with 21-passenger seat Douglas DC-3s with direct service to such major cities as Minneapolis/St. Paul, MN, Milwaukee, Chicago, Detroit and New York City with these eastbound flights making intermediate stops enroute at smaller cities such as Spokane, Great Falls, Missoula, Helena, Billings and other small cities. United Airlines was operating Douglas DC-6, Douglas DC-4 and Douglas DC-3 service from Boeing Field in 1947 with direct, no change of plane flights to San Francisco, Los Angeles, Salt Lake City, Denver, Boise, Oakland, Burbank, San Diego, Vancouver, B.C., Chicago, Cleveland, Washington, D.C., Philadelphia and New York City. At this same time in 1947, United was also operating 20 nonstop flights on a daily basis to Portland, OR as well as a daily nonstop DC-6 flight to San Francisco named "The California" which continued on to Los Angeles on a one stop basis with the airline also operating daily direct service from the airport to smaller cities in Washington state, Oregon, California, Idaho, Nebraska and Iowa. In 1950, Pan American World Airways (Pan Am) was operating weekly nonstop Boeing 377 Stratocruiser service from Boeing Field nonstop to Honolulu with this flight continuing on to Manila where connections were offered to Pan Am Douglas DC-4 flights to Hong Kong and Singapore. Pan Am was also operating Douglas DC-4 service from the airport in 1950 nonstop to Fairbanks, AK with direct one stop service to Nome, AK as well as DC-4 nonstop service to Ketchikan, AK (via the Annette Island Airport) with flights continuing on to Juneau, AK followed by Whitehorse, Yukon in Canada and then on to Fairbanks.

In later years, West Coast Airlines operated scheduled passenger flights from Boeing Field to Idaho, Oregon, Washington state, northern California, western Montana, northern Utah, and Calgary in Alberta. The airline's April 1968 timetable lists nonstop service to Aberdeen, WA/Hoquiam, WA, Boise, ID, Olympia, WA, Pasco, WA, Portland, OR, Salt Lake City, UT, Spokane, WA, Tacoma, WA, Wenatchee, WA and Yakima, WA operated with primarily with Fairchild F-27 prop-jets as well as Douglas DC-3 and Piper Navajo prop aircraft but also with Douglas DC-9 jets to Portland, Boise and Salt Lake City. West Coast, which had its headquarters in the Seattle area and operated all of its flights from Boeing Field, merged with Pacific Air Lines and Bonanza Air Lines to form Air West (later renamed Hughes Airwest following its acquisition by Howard Hughes in 1970) which continued serving Boeing Field until it moved its passenger service to Seattle-Tacoma International Airport (SEA) in 1971. Before the move to SEA, in January 1971 Hughes Airwest was operating nonstop McDonnell Douglas DC-9-30 jet service from the airport to Portland, Spokane and Pasco as well as direct, no change of plane DC-9-30 service to Boise, Calgary, Salt Lake City, Las Vegas, Twin Falls, Lewiston, Phoenix and Tucson, and was also operating Fairchild F-27 turboprop service from BFI at this time to Astoria, Bend, Ephrata, Hoquiam, Klamath Falls, Lewiston, Olympia, Pasco, Portland, Pullman, Sacramento, Spokane, Tacoma, Walla Walla, Wenatchee and Yakima.

Aeroamerica, an airline based at Boeing Field from 1971 to 1982 which operated Boeing 707 and Boeing 720 jetliners, flew nonstop to Spokane, Washington in 1978. Air Oregon, a commuter airline, operated Swearingen Metro propjets in 1979 nonstop to its hub in Portland, Oregon. Helijet, a helicopter airline based at Vancouver International Airport in British Columbia, operated scheduled Sikorsky S-76 helicopter flights to the Victoria Harbour Heliport in British Columbia with direct one stop service to Helijet's Vancouver Harbour Heliport located in the downtown Vancouver, B.C. area.

JSX began service between Boeing Field and Oakland International Airport on July 1, 2019 using Embraer 135 regional jets. As a result of the COVID-19 pandemic, JSX announced in April 2020 that it would indefinitely cease its flights from Boeing Field.

== ICE flights ==
The U.S. Justice Department filed a lawsuit against King County in 2020 to allow Immigration and Customs Enforcement (ICE) deportation flights to leave from Boeing Field. The county had previously halted the practice, forcing the flights to be redirected to Yakima Air Terminal. In March 2023, a federal judge issued a court order allowing deportation flights to resume from Boeing Field. For each flight, airport officials allow community members to gather in an observation room and watch the aircraft using the airport's video system. Each month, King County updates its website with available information about past deportation flights.

== Accidents at or near BFI ==
- On January 2, 1949, a Douglas C-47 Skytrain operated by Seattle Air Charter crashed after takeoff due to ice and frost on the surfaces of the wings. There were 14 fatalities among the three crew and 27 passengers on board.
- On July 19, 1949, a Curtiss C-46 Commando operated by Air Transport Associates crashed into a house after taking off due to loss of power to the left engine. Two passengers were killed out of 32 on board, along with one ground fatality.
- On November 17, 1955, a Douglas C-54 Skymaster operated by Peninsular Air Transport crashed into a residential area 2.5 miles south of Boeing Field. There were 28 fatalities among the 74 passengers and crew.

== See also ==
- List of airports in Washington
- Washington World War II Army Airfields
