= KCIA =

KCIA may refer to:

== Places ==
- Kansas City International Airport, Missouri, United States
- Kunming Changshui International Airport, Yunnan, China
- King County International Airport, Washington, United States

== Organizations ==
The Korean Central Intelligence Agency, the original name of the South Korean National Intelligence Service.
