= Harold Geiger =

American aviator

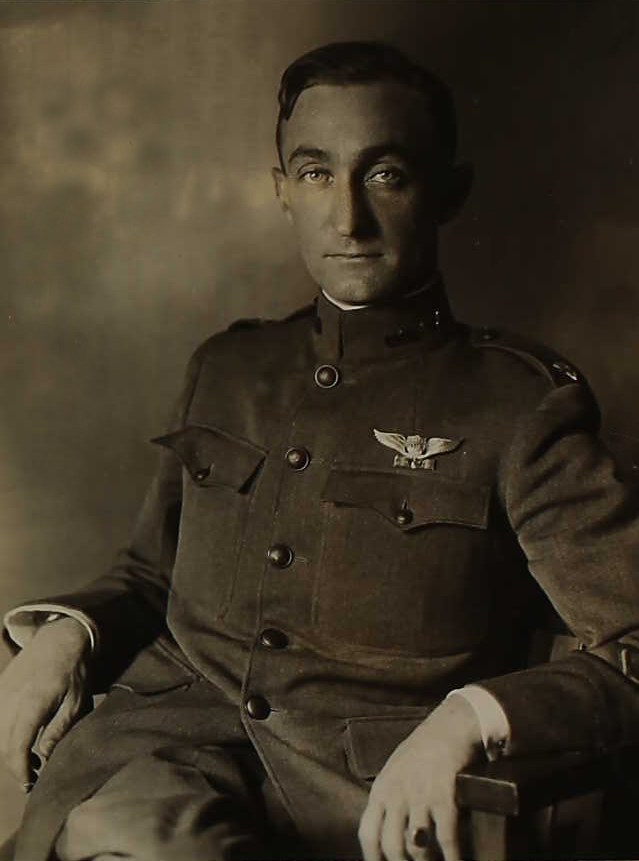
- Geiger in 1911
- Born: October 7, 1884; East Orange, New Jersey, US
- Died: May 17, 1927 (aged 42); Olmsted Field; Harrisburg, Pennsylvania, US
- Cause of death: Aircrash
- Resting place: Arlington National Cemetery
- Education: United States Military Academy (1904–1908)
- Spouse: Frances M. Bridges
- Children: 2

Major Harold Geiger (October 7, 1884 – May 17, 1927) was an American military officer and pioneer U.S. Army aviator, who was killed in an airplane crash in 1927. He was U.S. military aviator number 6. He was also a balloonist. Spokane International Airport is designated with the International Air Transport Association airport code GEG in his memory.

== Biography ==
Geiger was born on October 7, 1884, in East Orange, New Jersey, to Frederick C. Geiger and Josephine Dodd Squier. He attended East Orange High School.

Geiger was a cadet at the United States Military Academy June 16, 1904, to February 14, 1908, when he was graduated as an Army second lieutenant in the Coast Artillery Corps. He was promoted to first lieutenant November 8, 1908.

As a lieutenant, Geiger commanded the aviation assets of the United States Army Signal Corps in the Hawaiian Islands. The first Army airplanes, pilots and crews arrived in Oahu in July 1913. The planes were based at Fort Kamehameha, near present-day Hickam Air Force Base.

Lieutenant Geiger arrived in Oahu with two Curtiss Aeroplane Company seaplanes, a mechanic, 12 enlisted men, and other equipment. However, Geiger's aircraft were in poor shape. His flights were limited to short flights in Pearl Harbor and a longer flight to Diamond Head, Hawaii, and back to Fort Kamehameha.

Geiger was ordered to cease all flying operations in late 1913 because the trade winds were too strong. The airplanes were sold locally, and the engines were sent back to the North Island Flying School. The Hawaiian Islands would not see any more Army aviation activity until 1917.

=== Balloons and dirigibles ===
Geiger completed courses at the U.S. Army Balloon School in April 1917, and later during World War I served overseas with the Army's Balloon Section Headquarters in France as a lieutenant colonel. He completed dirigible studies in France and Italy. He was attached later to the Ambassador's staff in Berlin. While in Germany, Major Geiger sent reports to the Chief of the United States Army Air Service on the construction of the dirigible USS Los Angeles, and repeatedly urged that the craft, which was later taken over by the Navy, be purchased by the Army. He was on the Los Angeles on its transatlantic flight.

Geiger also commanded the Army Balloon School at Ross Field, Arcadia, California. By 1927, Geiger was commandant of Phillips Air Field at Aberdeen, Maryland.

On May 10, 1926, Major Geiger was slightly injured in a mid-air collision between two airplanes at Langley Field, near Hampton, Virginia. While attending the Air Corps Tactical School at Langley Field, his airplane and another flown by fellow student Horace Meek Hickam hit each other and crashed.

=== Death ===
On May 17, 1927, Geiger died in the crash of an Airco DH.4 he was piloting as he was taking off for a flight to Aberdeen Proving Grounds, Maryland. A newspaper article reported six mechanics and officers at the Middleton Air Station, at Olmsted Field, Pennsylvania as saying that Geiger's airplane dove into the ground from a height of 50 feet (15 m). Geiger managed to jump out just as the airplane struck the ground and burst into flames. He made desperate efforts to get clear of the wreckage and, according to the onlookers, half crawled and ran as far as the tail of the machine before he was overcome. There he dropped and the flames prevented the watchers from getting near enough to rescue him. Major Geiger was buried at Arlington National Cemetery.

== Legacy ==
In 1941, the United States Department of Defense purchased the area then known as Sunset Field from Spokane County, Washington, as a World War II training facility for future pilots of the Boeing B-17 Flying Fortress and the Douglas C-47 Skytrain. Following the acquisition, it renamed the facility Geiger Field in honor of Major Geiger. In 1946, a portion of the airfield was designated a municipal airport, and commercial airline operations were moved from Felts Field to Geiger Field. In 1960, the facility was renamed Spokane International Airport, but its IATA code remains GEG in honor of Geiger.

== Gallery ==
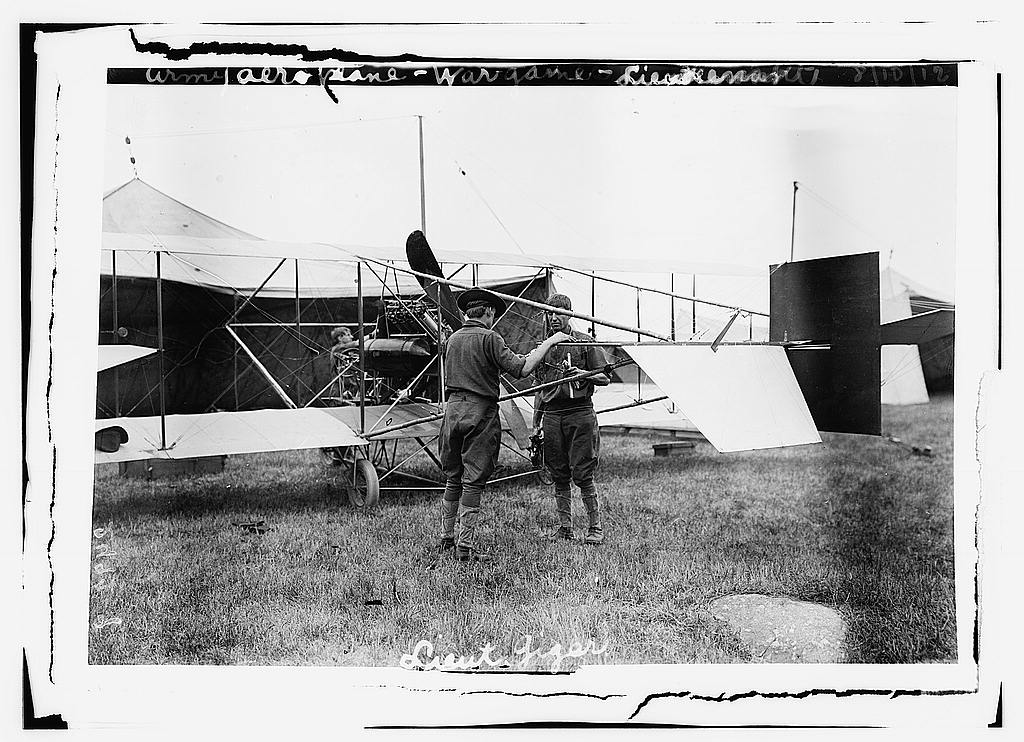
Geiger in 1912

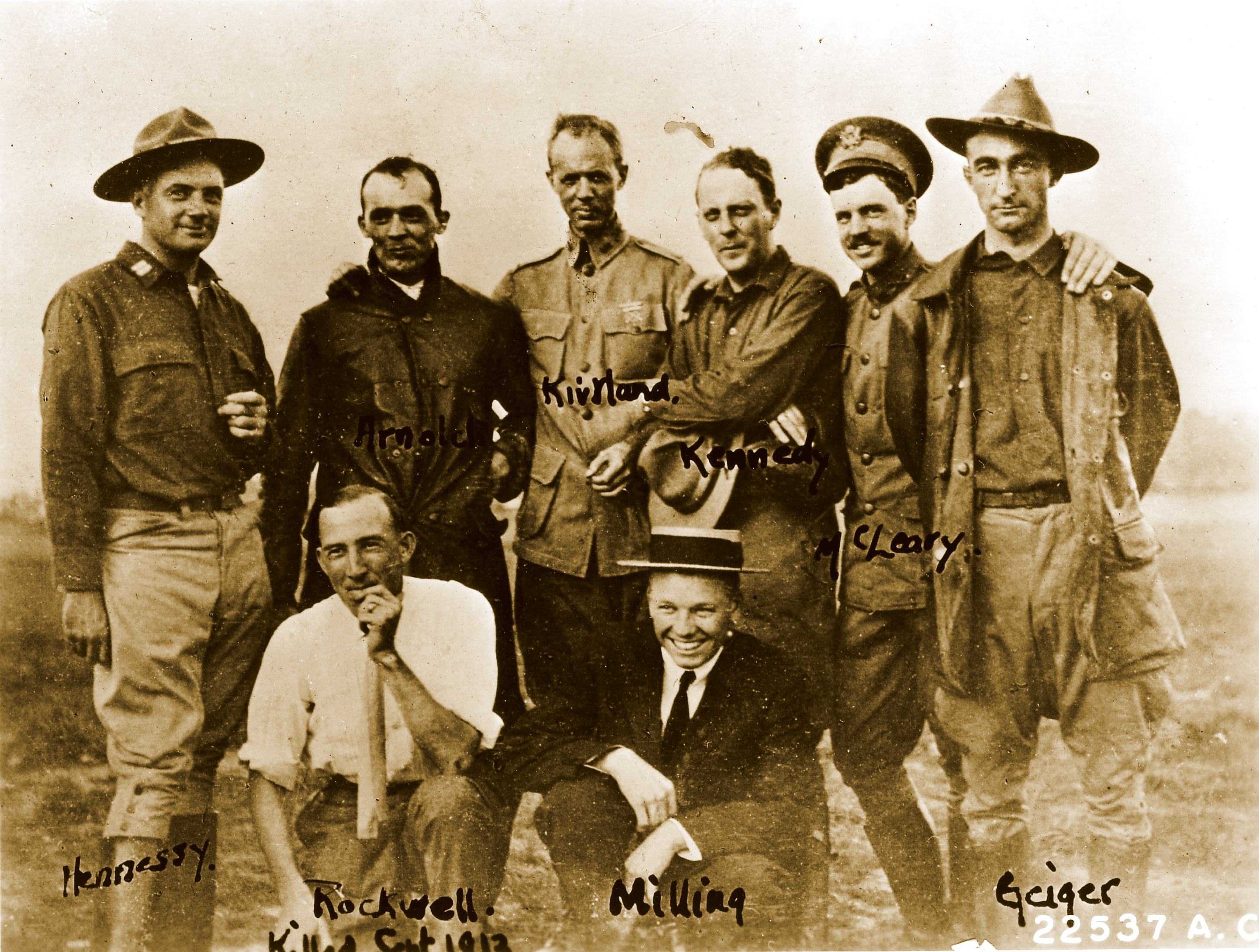
Geiger in 1911

Geiger in 1911
