= Washington World War II Army Airfields =

Washington World War II Army Airfields
- Part of World War II
- Map Of Washington World War II Army Airfields

Site information
- Type: Army Airfields

Site history
- Built: 1940–1944
- In use: 1940–present

During World War II, the United States Army Air Forces (USAAF) established numerous airfields in Washington for training pilots and aircrews of USAAF fighters and bombers.

Most of these airfields were under the command of Second Air Force or the Army Air Forces Training Command (AAFTC) (A predecessor of the current-day United States Air Force Air Education and Training Command). However the other USAAF support commands (Air Technical Service Command (ATSC); Air Transport Command (ATC) or Troop Carrier Command) commanded a significant number of airfields in a support roles.

It is still possible to find remnants of these wartime airfields. Many were converted into municipal airports, some were returned to agriculture and several were retained as United States Air Force installations and were front-line bases during the Cold War. Hundreds of the temporary buildings that were used survive today, and are being used for other purposes.

== Major airfields ==
Army Air Force Training Command

- Yakima Air Base, Yakima

Joint use USAAF/Civil Airport
Contract Flying School
Now: Yakima Air Terminal (IATA: YKM, ICAO: KYKM)

Air Transport Command

- Gray Field, AAF, Fort Lewis

302d Army Air Force Base Unit
Now: Gray Army Airfield, active Army Airfield which supports Fort Lewis.

Air Technical Service Command

- Boeing Field, Seattle
  (IATA: BFI, ICAO: KBFI)

Aircraft delivery facility, Joint use USAAF/Civil Airport

- Moses Lake AAF, Moses Lake

465th Army Air Force Base Unit
Was: Moses Lake Air Force Base (1947)
Was: Larson Air Force Base (1948-1966)
Now: Grant County International Airport
(IATA: MWH, ICAO: KMWH, FAA LID: MWH)

- Ellensburg 430 Army Air Force Base Unit, Ellensburg

Now: Bowers Airport
(IATA: ELN, ICAO: KELN, FAA LID: ELN)

- Spokane AAF, Spokane

498th Army Air Force Base Unit
Was: Spokane Air Force Base (1947-1950)
Now: Fairchild Air Force Base

Second Air Force

- Bellingham/Tulip AAF, Bellingham

Now: Bellingham International Airport
(IATA: BLI, ICAO: KBLI, FAA LID: BLI)

- Ephrata AAF, Ephrata

355th Army Air Force Base Unit
Now: Ephrata Municipal Airport
(IATA: EPH, ICAO: KEPH, FAA LID: EPH)

- Geiger/Sunset Field AAF, Spokane

41st Army Air Force Base Unit
Now: Spokane International Airport
(IATA: GEG, ICAO: KGEG, FAA LID: GEG)

Seven Mile Gunnery Range, Spokane
Sub-base of Geiger AAF
(7 miles NW of Spokane; may have only been a target field.)
Felts Field, Spokane
Auxiliary of Geiger AAF
Joint civil and contract AAF pilot training
Now: Felts Field Airport (IATA: SFF, ICAO: KSFF)

- McChord Field AAF, Tacoma

43d Army Air Force Base Unit
Was: McChord Air Force Base (1947-2010)
Now: Joint Base Lewis-McChord

- Olympia AAF, Olympia

Now: Olympia Airport
(IATA: OLM, ICAO: KOLM, FAA LID: OLM)

- Paine Field AAF, Everett/Paine

33d Army Air Force Base Unit
Was: Paine Air Force Base (1951-1968)
(Joint use USAF/Civil Airport)
Now: Paine Field/Snohomish County Airport (IATA: PAE, ICAO: KPAE)

- Port Angeles AAF, Port Angeles, Washington

Now: William R. Fairchild International Airport
(IATA: CLM, ICAO: KCLM)

- Port Townsend AAF, Port Hadlock

Now: Jefferson County International Airport (IATA: 0S9)

- Walla Walla AAF, Walla Walla

357th Army Air Force Base Unit
Now: Walla Walla Regional Airport (IATA: ALW, ICAO: KALW, FAA LID: ALW)
