= SeaPort Airlines =

American commuter airline

IATA	ICAO	Call sign
X4	X4	STEADY
- Commenced operations: May 20, 2025; 18 months ago
- Hubs: Portland International Airport; Boeing Field; Felts Field
- Destinations: 3
- Parent company: Kalinin Holdings, Inc.
- Headquarters: Boeing Field (Seattle, Washington)
- Website: SeaPort Airlines

SeaPort Airlines is an American airline with daily commuter flights between Seattle and Portland, Oregon, and between Seattle and Spokane, Washington. The airline, which is a sister company of regional airline Alaska Seaplanes, is a division of Kalinin Holdings, Inc., a closely held family business headquartered in Juneau, Alaska, that owns a group of commuter airlines and tourism operations. SeaPort returned on May 20, 2025 under a new leadership team to Pacific Northwest skies following the previous company's closure in 2016.

SeaPort offers scheduled service out of a small terminal on the Atlantic Aviation campus, adjacent to the main terminal, the general aviation fixed base operator (FBO) at Portland International Airport (PDX), Boeing Field in Seattle, and Felts Field in Spokane.

Kent Craford, Chairman and CEO of Kalinin Holdings, co-founded the original SeaPort Airlines in 2008, but departed the company in 2009 after a falling out with the primary investor. In 2011, he and two partners acquired Alaska Seaplanes, a small floatplane company in Juneau, and grew it over 15 years into the primary regional airline of Southeast Alaska, which today with sister companies employs over 300 people and operates two dozen aircraft. After Craford's 2009 departure, the original SeaPort pursued an expansion into government subsidy markets ending in Chapter 7 bankruptcy in 2016.

== Fleet ==
SeaPort operates a fleet of Pilatus PC-12, operated under the Air Excursion certificate, configured to seat nine passengers.

== Destinations ==
As of March 2026, SeaPort services the following destinations:

City	Airport	IATA Code	Destinations	Notes
Oregon
Portland	Portland International Airport	PDX	Seattle	Operates at PDX Business Aviation
(Washington (state)) Washington
Olympia	Olympia Regional Airport	OLM	Seasonal: Spokane (Begins January 8, 2027)	
Seattle	Boeing Field	BFI	Portland, Spokane	
Spokane	Felts Field	SFF	Seattle Seasonal: Olympia (Begins January 8, 2027)	
