= Bowers Airport =

Airport in Washington, United States

Bowers Field (former Ellensburg Army Airfield)
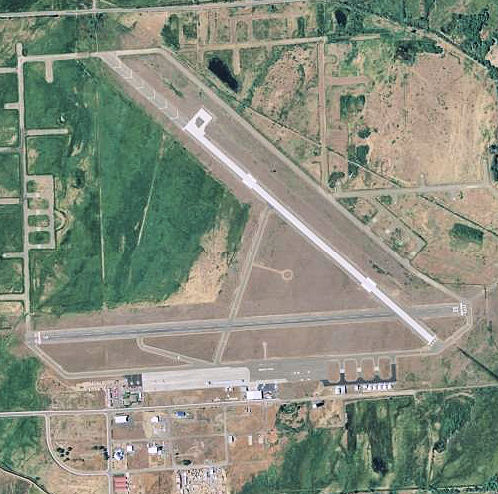
- USGS 2006 orthophoto
- IATA: ELN; ICAO: KELN; FAA LID: ELN

Summary
- Airport type: Public
- Owner: Kittitas County
- Serves: Ellensburg, Washington
- Elevation AMSL: 1,764 ft (538 m)
- Coordinates: 47°01′59″N 120°31′50″W

Map
- Location of airport in Washington ELN (the United States)

Runways
Direction	Length		Surface
Direction	ft	m	Surface
11/29	4,301	1,311	Concrete

Statistics (2012)
- Aircraft operations: 60,445
- Based aircraft: 48
- Source: Federal Aviation Administration

Bowers Field (IATA: ELN, ICAO: KELN, FAA LID: ELN) is a county-owned, public-use airport in Kittitas County, Washington, United States. It is located two nautical miles (4 km) north of the central business district of Ellensburg, Washington. This airport is included in the National Plan of Integrated Airport Systems for 2011–2015, which categorized it as a general aviation facility.

== History ==
The airfield was established in 1943 as Ellensburg Army Airfield and manned by the 302d Base Headquarters and Air Base Squadron. Though planned as a fighter airfield for Fourth Air Force, it was taken over by Air Technical Service Command as a maintenance and supply depot, supporting transient Lend-Lease aircraft being flown to Alaska for subsequent transfer to the Soviet Union. The airfield had one auxiliary field, located at 47°06′39″N 120°37′58″W, which is now abandoned, though remains of a runway are still visible in aerial photography.

Military use ended in February 1945, and the airfield was turned over to War Assets Administration for subsequent transfer to Kittitas County for development into a civil airport.

Bowers Field is named in honor of Ensign Keith Bowers, the first man from Kittitas County killed in World War II. Bowers was at Pearl Harbor when it was attacked by the Japanese on December 7, 1941. The field became a training base for military pilots during the war.

Established in 1975, Central Washington University's aviation program is the only fully accredited public university aviation program in the Pacific Northwest. The school has a fleet of 19 aircraft, mostly Piper PA-28-181 Archer TXs.

Today, large numbers of former aircraft dispersal areas are still maintained, along with an extensive system of taxiways with modern aircraft hangars.

== Facilities and aircraft ==
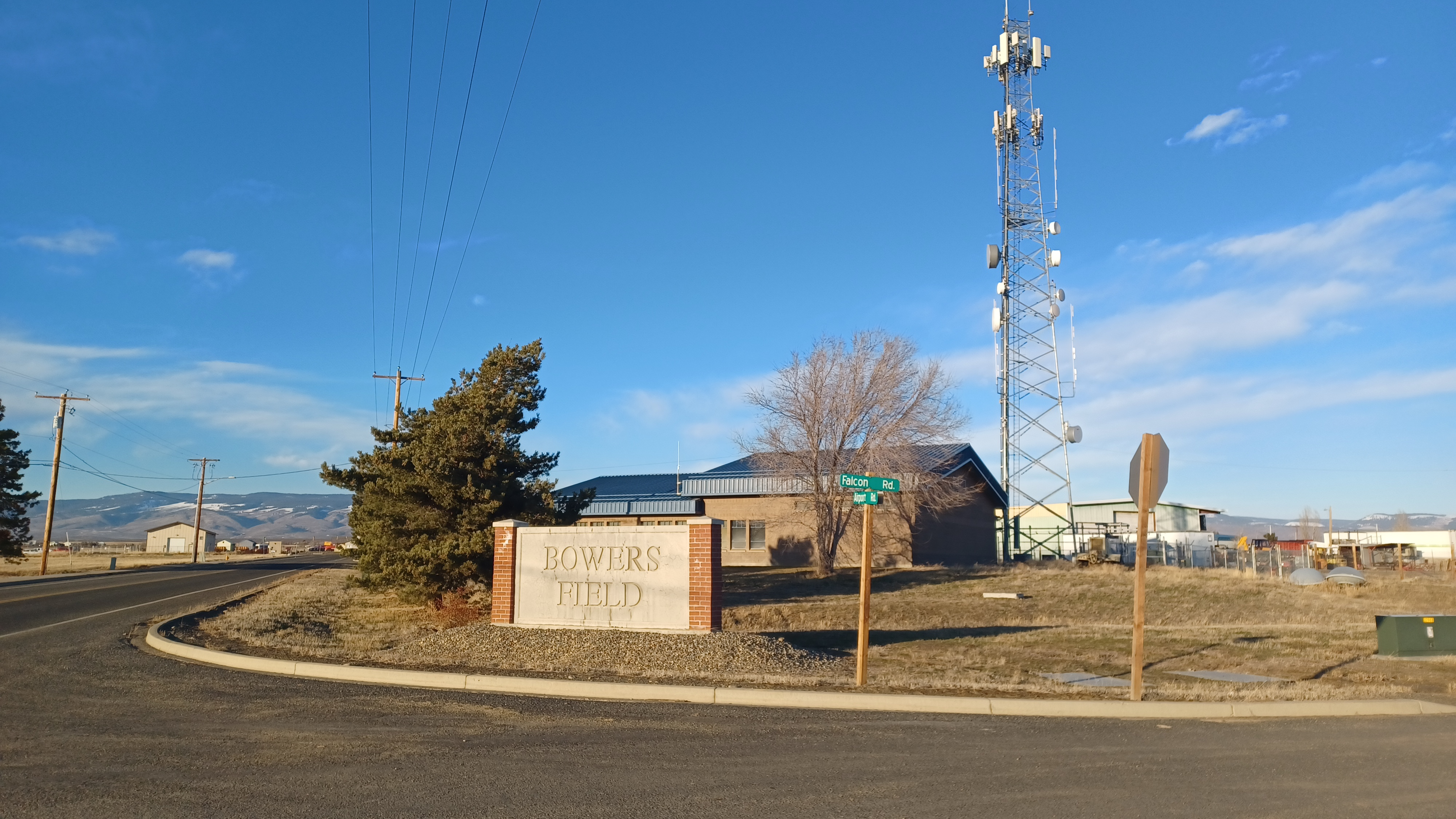
Entrance to the airport in 2023

Bowers Field covers an area of 1,032 acres (418 ha) at an elevation of 1,764 feet (538 m) above mean sea level. It has one runway: 11/29 is 4,301 by 150 feet (1,311 x 46 m) with a concrete surface. The former runway 7/25 was 5,590 by 150 feet (1,704 x 46 m) with an asphalt surface, but was permanently closed in June 2018.

For the 12-month period ending May 30, 2012, the airport had 60,445 aircraft operations, an average of 165 per day: 97% general aviation, 3% air taxi, and <1% military. At that time there were 48 aircraft based at this airport: 90% single-engine, 8% multi-engine, and 2% glider.

== See also ==
- List of airports in Washington
- Washington World War II Army Airfields
