= William R. Fairchild International Airport =

William R. Fairchild International Airport Port Angeles Army Airfield
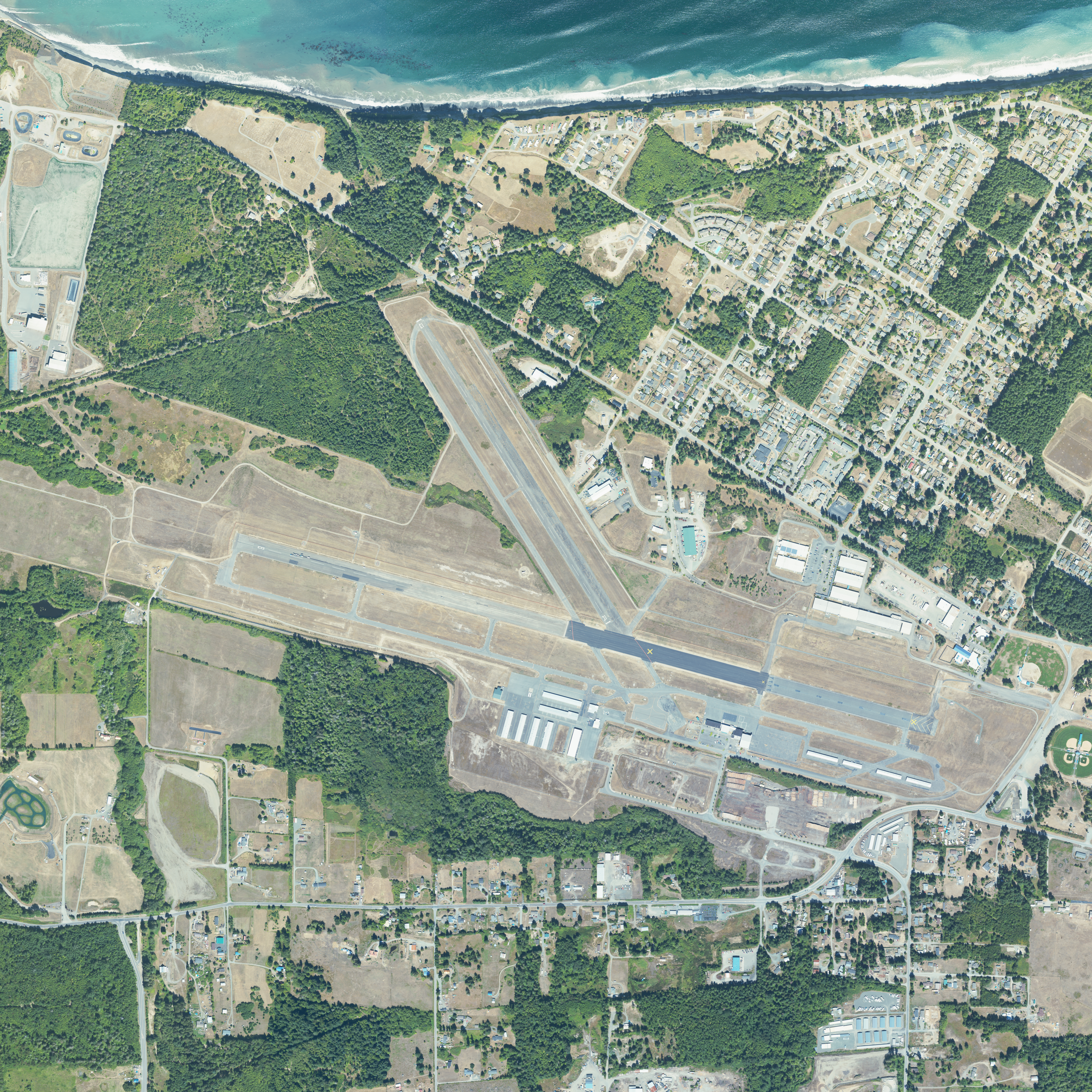
- Airport in August 2023
- IATA: CLM; ICAO: KCLM; FAA LID: CLM

Summary
- Airport type: Public
- Owner: Port of Port Angeles
- Serves: Port Angeles, Washington
- Elevation AMSL: 291 ft / 89 m
- Coordinates: 48°07′13″N 123°29′59″W

Map
- Location of airport in Washington CLM (the United States)

Runways
Direction	Length		Surface
Direction	ft	m	Surface
8/26	6,347	1,935	Asphalt
13/31	3,255	989	Asphalt

Statistics (2018)
- Aircraft operations: 25,158
- Based aircraft: 66
- Source: Federal Aviation Administration

William R. Fairchild International Airport (IATA: CLM, ICAO: KCLM, FAA LID: CLM) is a public airport located within the city limits of Port Angeles in Clallam County, Washington, United States. It is 3.5 miles (3.0 nmi; 5.6 km) northwest of the central business district of Port Angeles, near the Strait of Juan de Fuca. The airport is owned by the Port of Port Angeles.

== History ==
The airport was developed from 1934 through 1948 by the Works Progress Administration, the U.S. Army and the U.S. Navy. It was named Clallam County Municipal Landing Field when ownership was given to Clallam County in 1948. Three years later the county transferred the airport to the Port of Port Angeles. In 1953, William R. Fairchild started the Angeles Flying Service and became the first airport supervisor. The airport was renamed in his honor in September 1969, following his death in an aircraft accident earlier in the year.

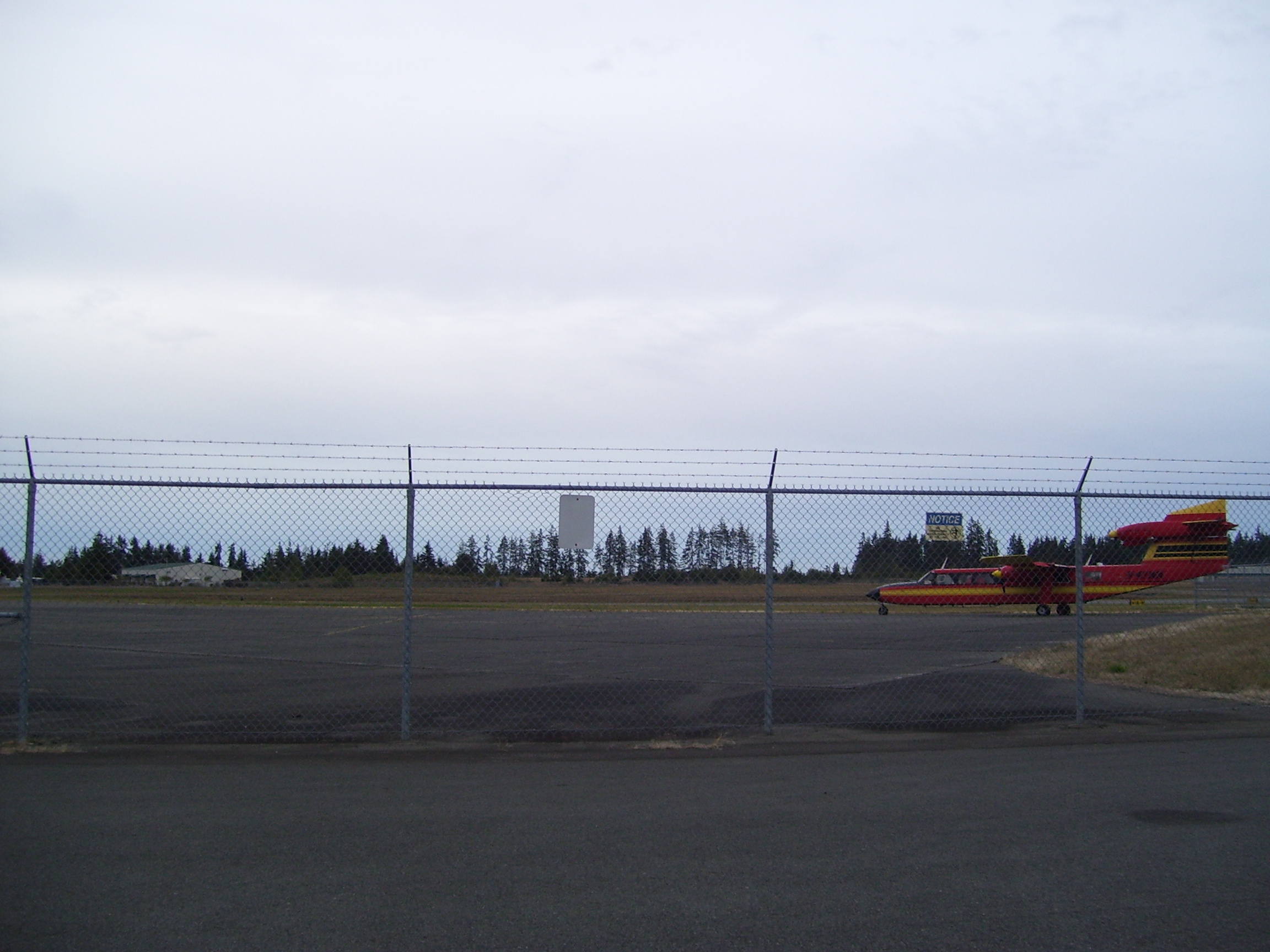
Tarmac with a Britten Norman Trislander aircraft

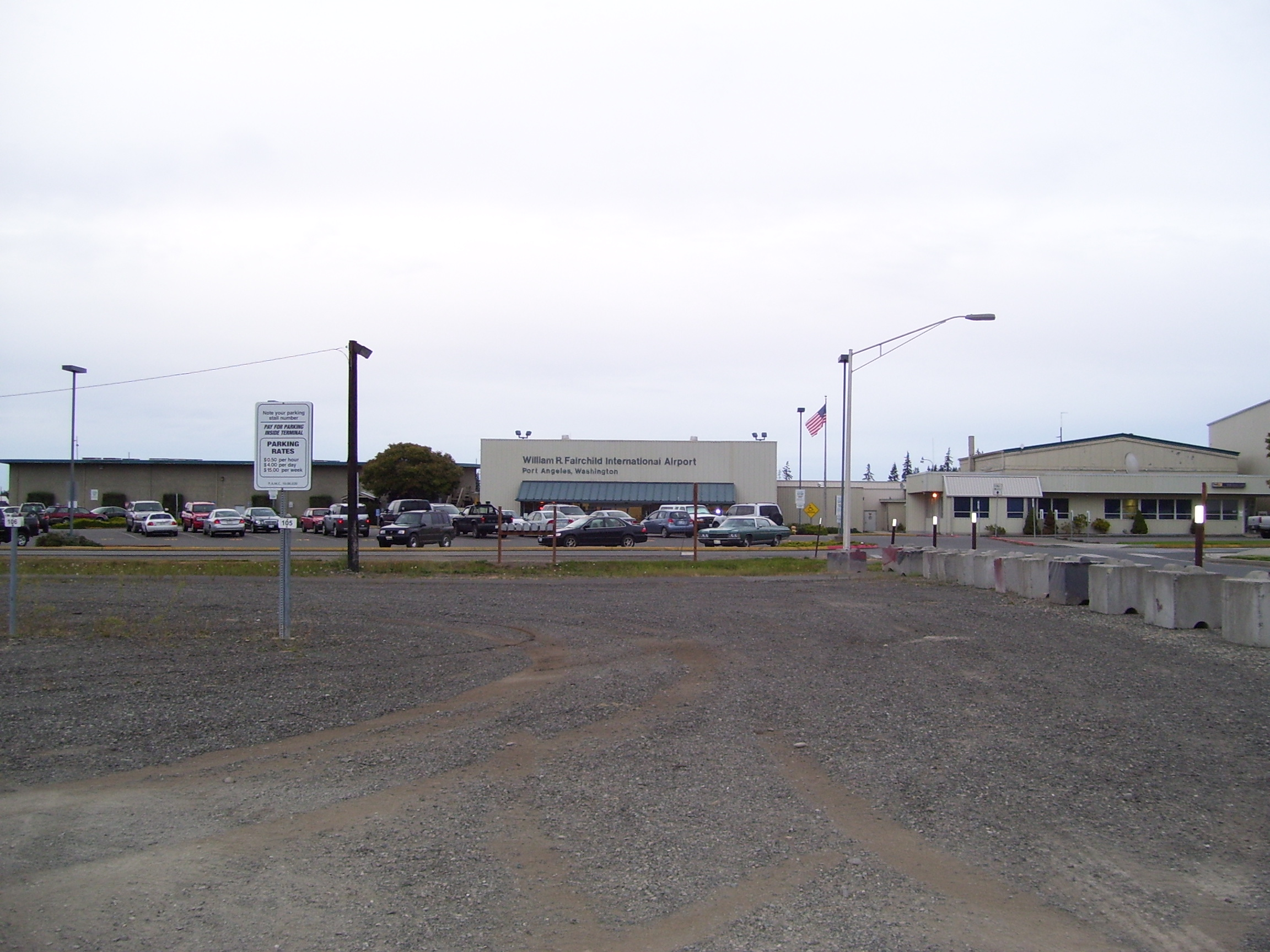
Main terminal

== Facilities and aircraft ==
William R. Fairchild International Airport covers an area of 797 acres (323 ha) at an elevation of 291 feet (89 m) above mean sea level. It has two asphalt paved runways:

- 8/26 measuring 6,347 ft × 150 ft (1,935 m × 46 m)
- 13/31 measuring 3,245 ft × 50 ft (989 m × 15 m)

The primary runway is operated with an instrument landing system and can handle aircraft up to an Airbus A319.

For the 12-month period ending December 31, 2018, the airport had 25,158 aircraft operations, an average of 69 per day: 79% general aviation, 20% air taxi, and <1% military. At that time there were 66 aircraft based at this airport: 91% single-engine, 4.5% multi-engine, 1.5% jet, and 3% helicopter.

Fairchild Airport is also home to Port Angeles' Civil Air Patrol squadron.

== Airlines and destinations ==
=== Cargo ===
Airlines	Destinations
FedEx Feeder	Seattle/Tacoma

== See also ==
- List of airports in Washington
- Washington World War II Army Airfields
