= Felts Field =

Airport near Spokane, Washington

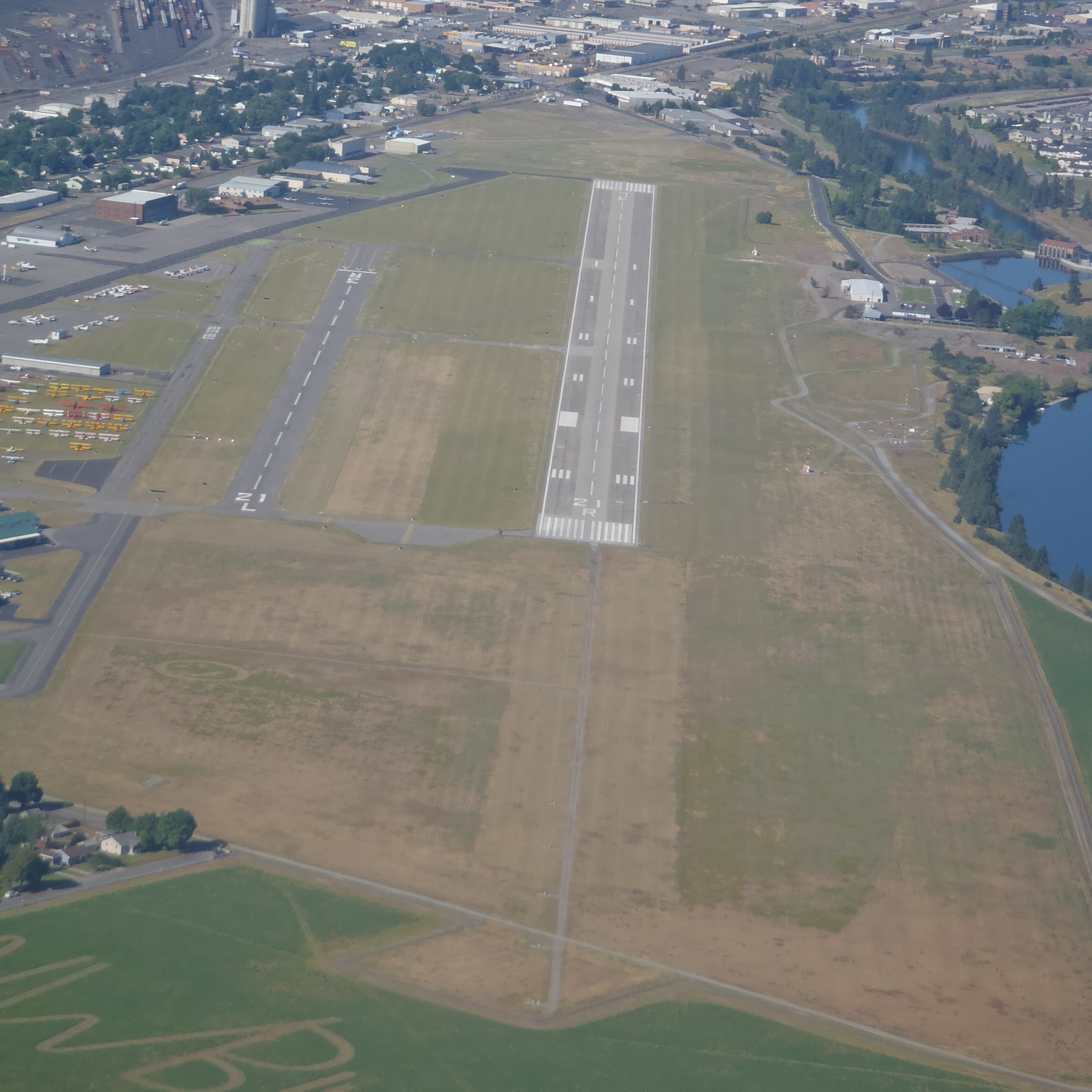
- View from northeast in 2011, approaching runway 21R (now 22R)
- IATA: SFF; ICAO: KSFF; FAA LID: SFF

Summary
- Airport type: Public
- Owner: Spokane City-County
- Serves: Spokane, Washington
- Elevation AMSL: 1,957 ft (596 m)
- Coordinates: 47°40′59″N 117°19′21″W
- Website: feltsfield.spokaneairports.net

Map
- Location in Washington Location in the United States

Runways
Direction	Length		Surface
Direction	ft	m	Surface
4L/22R	4,499	1,371	Concrete
4R/22L	2,650	808	Asphalt

Statistics
- Aircraft operations (2015): 75,124
- Based aircraft (2017): 176
- Source: Federal Aviation Administration

Felts Field (IATA: SFF, ICAO: KSFF, FAA LID: SFF) is a public airport in the Northwestern United States, located five miles (8 km) northeast of Downtown Spokane, in Spokane County, Washington. It is owned by Spokane City-County.

The airport has two parallel runways. Now used for general aviation, Felts Field was Spokane's commercial airport before the opening of Spokane International Airport.

The Federal Aviation Administration (FAA) National Plan of Integrated Airport Systems for 2017–2021 categorized it as a regional reliever facility.

== History ==
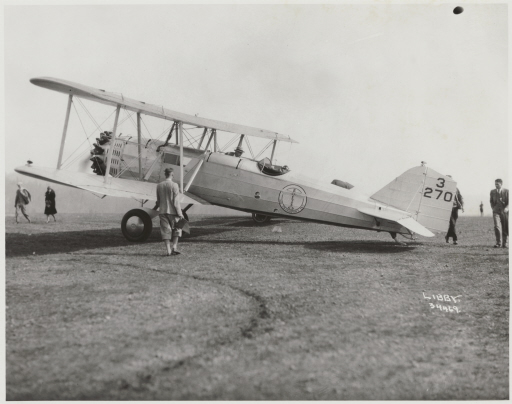
Boeing Air Transport B-40 at Felts Field in September 1927

Felts Field, Spokane's historic airfield, is on the south bank of the Spokane River east of Spokane. Aviation activities began in 1913. Then called the Parkwater airstrip, it was designated a municipal flying field in 1920 at the instigation of the Spokane Chamber of Commerce.

In 1926, the Department of Commerce recognized Parkwater as an airport, one of the first in the West. In September 1927, in conjunction with Spokane's National Air Races that Felts Field hosted, the airport was renamed Felts Field for James Buell Felts, a Washington Air National Guard aviator killed in a crash that May. Parkwater Aviation Field, later Felts Field, was the location for flight instruction, charter service, airplane repair, aerial photography, headquarters of the 116th Observation Squadron of the Washington Air National Guard, and eventually the first airmail and commercial flights in and out of Spokane.

In the summer of 1946, the airlines (Northwest and United) moved west to Geiger Field (later Spokane International Airport). Felts Field remains a busy regional hub for private and small-plane aviation and related businesses and services. In 1991, it was designated Felts Field Historic District on the National Register of Historic Places.

Today the airport is primarily used for general aviation with only SeaPort Airlines offering scheduled passenger service. Scheduled Part 135 cargo operations remain via UPS and DHL contracting (Ameriflight LLC and previously Merlin Express Airways).

== Facilities ==
FAA diagram

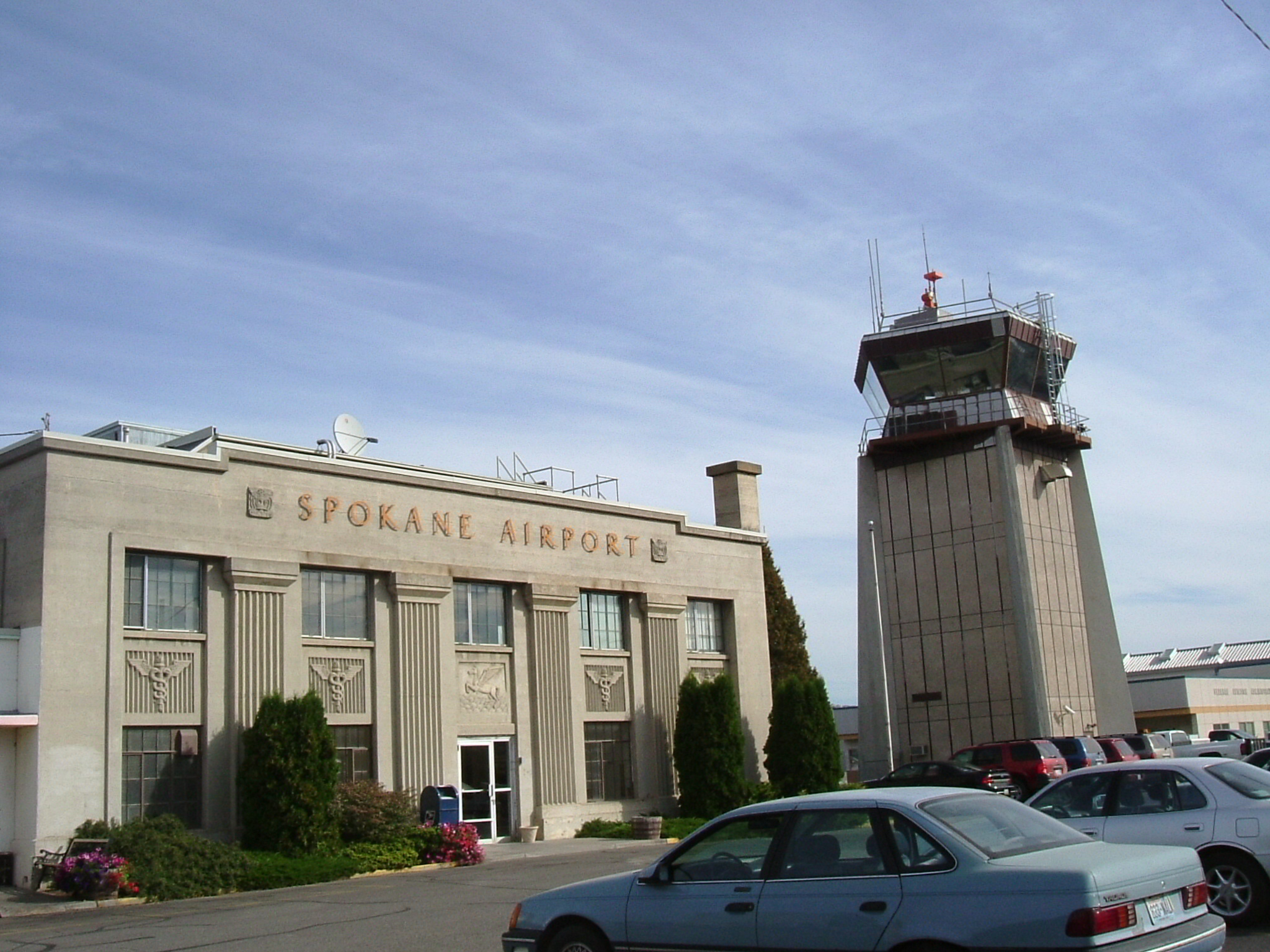
The former terminal and control tower

Felts Field covers 416 acres (1.68 km^{2}) at an elevation of 1,957 feet (596 m) above sea level. It has two runways: 4L/22R is 4,499 by 150 feet (1,371 by 46 m) concrete and 4R/22L is 2,650 by 75 feet (808 by 23 m) asphalt. It has a seaplane landing area designated 3W/21W, 6,000 by 100 feet (1,829 by 30 m). The runways were formerly numbered 3/21, and the four-story control tower was constructed in 1967.

In the year ending February 28, 2015, it had 54,881 aircraft operations, averaging 150 per day: 93% general aviation, 7% air taxi, and <1% military. In July 2017, 176 aircraft were based at Felts Field: 146 single-engine, 15 multi-engine, and 15 helicopters.

== Historic Flight Foundation museum ==
The hangar facilities at the airport house the Historic Flight Foundation aviation museum. The museum was opened to the public in 2019 as a second location to the Historic Flight Foundation's Paine Field museum in Everett, Washington.

== Airlines and destinations ==
=== Passenger ===
Airlines	Destinations
SeaPort Airlines	Seattle–Boeing; Seasonal: Olympia (begins January 8, 2027)

=== Cargo ===
Airlines	Destinations
AirPac Airlines	Portland (OR), Seattle–Boeing

== Accidents and incidents ==
- On the morning of Saturday, November 29, 2003, an Ameriflight LLC cargo (Fairchild Swearingen Metroliner) (N439AF) crashed in heavy fog on approach to runway 21R (now 22R) using the instrument landing system (ILS). The pilot's horizontal situation indicator (HSI) was previously noted as inoperative, deferred, and due for scheduled maintenance. It is unclear whether the pilot was using backup instrumentation as prescribed via the deferral process or using the faulty HSI. The Metro III failed to maintain ILS glide slope and crashed short of the runway into rising terrain and trees. The pilot was killed during the subsequent impact and fire, and the aircraft was damaged beyond repair.

== See also ==
- List of airports in Washington
- Washington World War II Army Airfields
