= Spokane International Airport =

Airport in Washington state, United States

Spokane International Airport Geiger Army Airfield

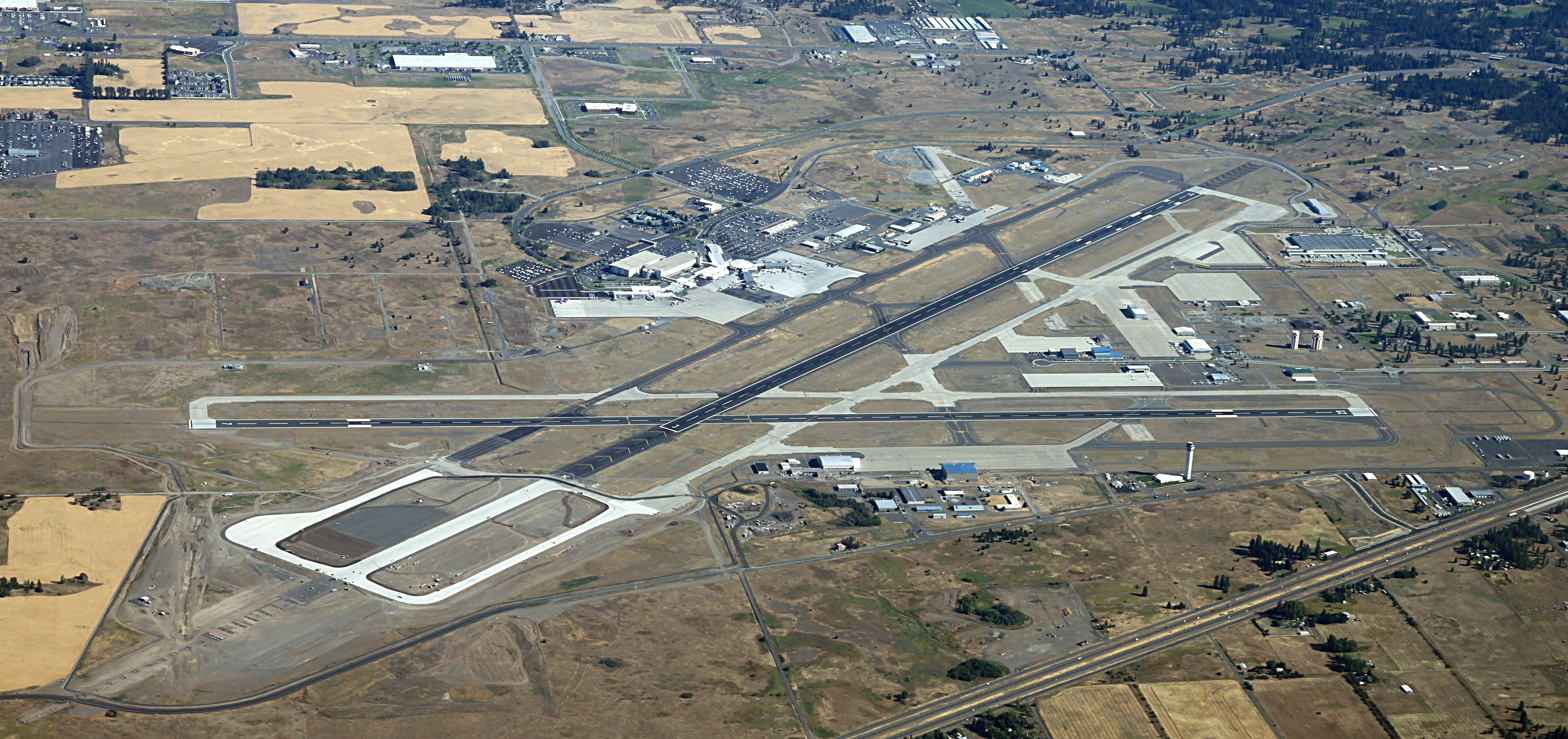
- Spokane International Airport in 2010, viewed from the south
- IATA: GEG; ICAO: KGEG; FAA LID: GEG

Summary
- Airport type: Public
- Owner: Spokane County & City of Spokane
- Operator: Spokane Airport Board
- Serves: Inland Northwest (primarily Spokane–Coeur d'Alene area)
- Location: West Hills, Spokane, Washington, United States
- Hub for: Empire Airlines
- Elevation AMSL: 2,385 ft (727 m)
- Coordinates: 47°37′12″N 117°32′02″W
- Website: SpokaneAirports.net

Maps
- FAA airport diagram
- Interactive map of Spokane International Airport

Runways
Direction	Length		Surface
Direction	ft	m	Surface
03/21	11,002	3,353	Asphalt/concrete
08/26	8,199	2,499	Asphalt

Statistics (2025)
- Aircraft operations: 68,152
- Total passengers: 4,350,330 ▲2.0%
- Cargo handled: 60,153 US Tons
- Source: Federal Aviation Administration; Spokane International Airport

Spokane International Airport (IATA: GEG, ICAO: KGEG, FAA LID: GEG) is a commercial airport in Spokane, Washington, United States, located approximately 7 miles (11 km) west-southwest of Downtown Spokane. It is the primary airport serving the Inland Northwest, which consists of 30 counties and includes areas such as Spokane, the Tri-Cities, both in Eastern Washington, and Coeur d'Alene in North Idaho. The airport's code, GEG, is derived from its former name, Geiger Field, which honored Major Harold Geiger (1884–1927).

As of 2023, Spokane International Airport (GEG) ranks as the 73rd-busiest airport in the United States in terms of passenger enplanements. At 4,264,875 total passengers served in 2024, it is the second busiest airport in Washington. GEG is served by seven airlines with non-stop service to more than 20 destinations in the continental US.

It is included in the Federal Aviation Administration (FAA) National Plan of Integrated Airport Systems for 2017–2021, in which it is categorized as a small-hub primary commercial service facility.

Excluding military airfields, general aviation, and cargo airports, GEG Airport, at 6,140 acres (9.6 sq mi; 24.8 km^{2}), is the largest commercial/public airport in all of Washington state in terms of land area.

== History ==
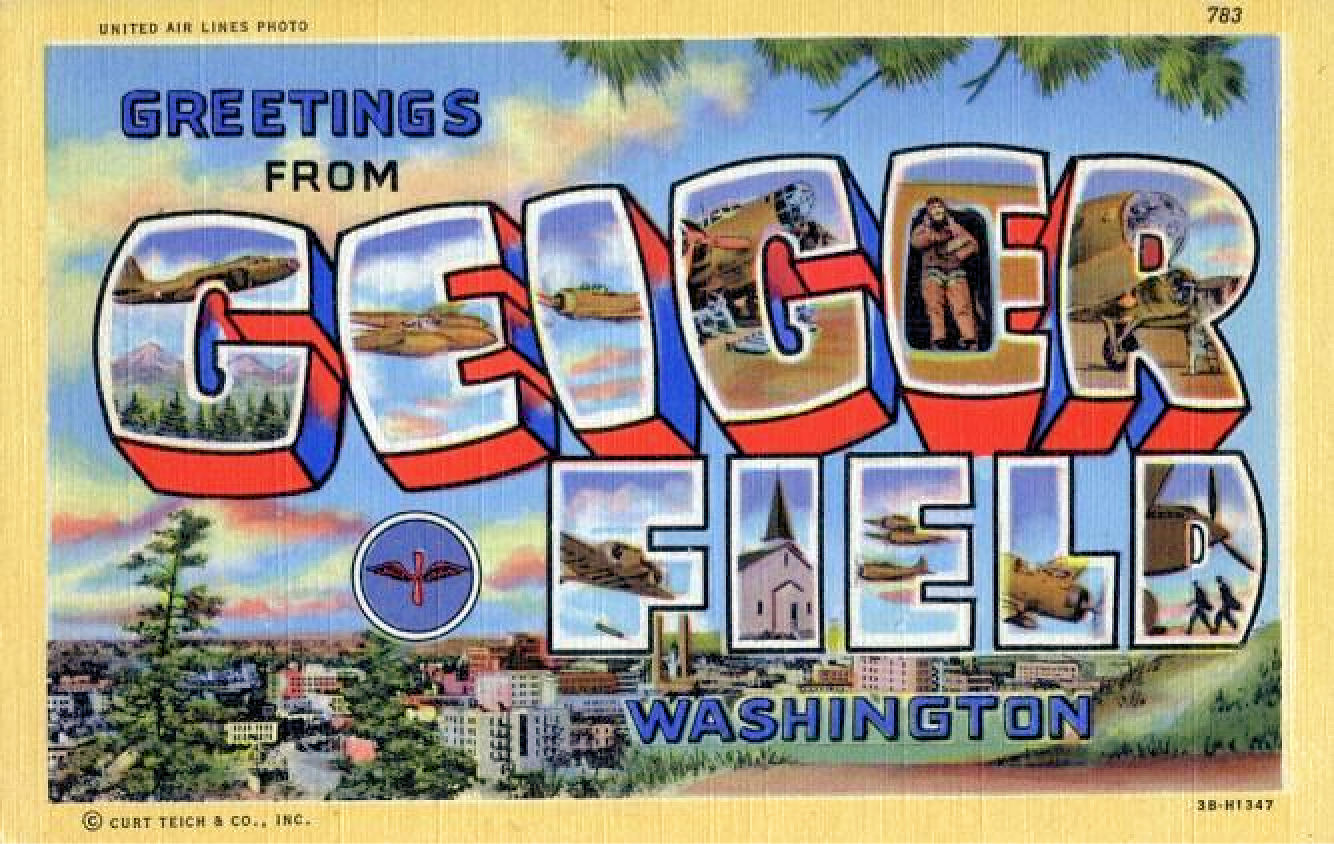
World War II Geiger Field postcard

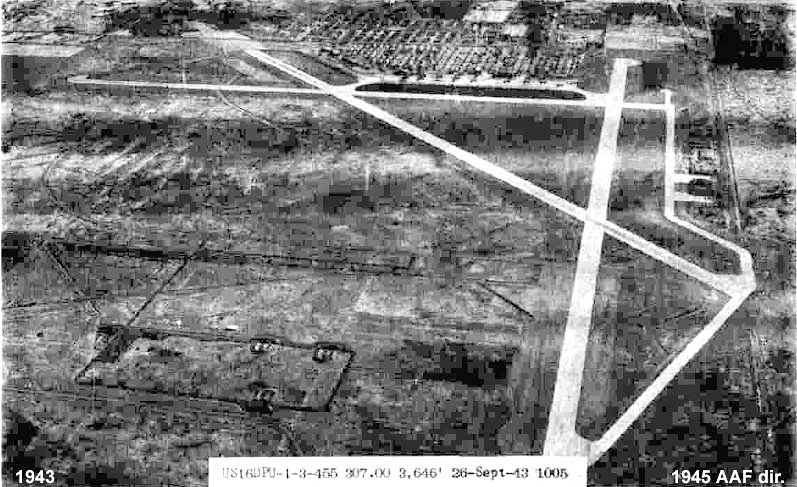
Geiger Field in 1943

Known as Sunset Field before 1941, it was purchased from the county by the War Department and renamed Geiger Field (hence the IATA code GEG) after Major Harold Geiger, an Army aviation pioneer who died in a crash in 1927.

During World War II, Geiger Field was a major training base by Second Air Force as a group training airfield for B-17 Flying Fortress heavy bombardment units, with new aircraft being obtained from Boeing near Seattle. It was also used by Air Technical Service Command as an aircraft maintenance and supply depot; Deer Park Airport and Felts Field were auxiliaries.

In 1943, General Hap Arnold established the first formal fire protection training course at Geiger Field, Washington. It was used until 1946.

Geiger Field was served by a rail connection to the Great Northern Railway.

Geiger was closed in late 1945 and turned over to War Assets Administration (WAA), then transferred to Spokane County and developed into a commercial airport. The airport hosted USAF Air Defense Command interceptor units during the Cold War for air defense of Hanford Nuclear Reservation and Grand Coulee Dam. Built in 1942 as the Spokane Air Depot, Fairchild Air Force Base is four miles (6 km) to the west.

It became Spokane's municipal airport in 1946, replacing Felts Field, and received its present name in 1960, after the City of Spokane was allotted Spokane Geiger Field by the Surplus Property Act and Air Canada started service to Calgary. In November 1972, the 4702d Defense Wing moved to the airfield. It was still used by the Air Force into the early 1960s, with the 84th Fighter Group operating Convair F-106 Delta Dart interceptors. The airport code is still GEG, for Geiger Field.

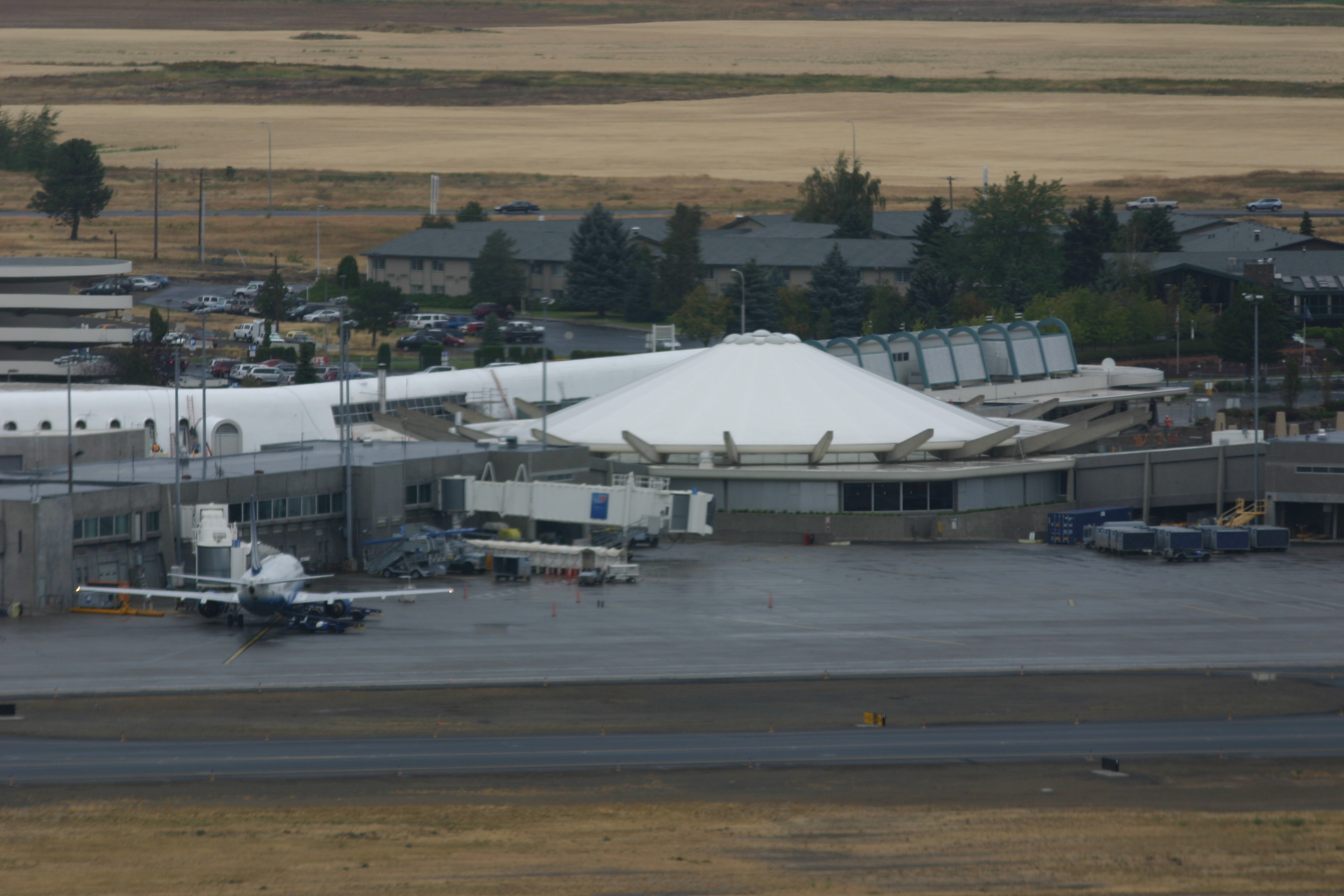
Concourse A and B complex originally opened in 1965.

The current Concourse A and B complex opened in 1965, designed by Warren C. Heylman and William Trogdon.

=== Expansion from the 1970s ===
A second level was added to Concourse A and Concourse B in 1974.

The airport has a Master Plan, which includes a third runway and gates added to Concourse C.

A new control tower has been built south of the airport, replacing the one near Concourse C. The new control tower is the tallest one in the State. The Terminal, Rotunda, and Concourse C Enhancement Project (TRACE) was recently completed, designed by Bernardo/Wills Architects, P.C. The project, which concluded in November 2006, added retail space and expanded security checkpoints in the airport's three concourses, and gave the Rotunda an aesthetic renovation. In 2010, 2000 feet was added to Runway 3–21 and parallel taxiways 'A' and 'G', enabling heavier aircraft departures in summer months.

By 2023, the airport plans to add new gates, centralized security and expanded baggage claim space as it looks to add more direct flights, including to the east coast, to capitalize on and accommodate growing passenger and cargo traffic; the Spokane market has been hosting big events and attracting business to the area.

=== Terminal renovation and expansion (TREX) program ===
On October 20, 2022, the airport broke ground on the first phase of the project which includes expansion of Concourse C. The $150 million addition will add 144,000 square feet, 6 new gates and modernization of the existing terminal. The first portion of the expanded concourse, which includes three gates at the west end, opened in June 2024. The remainder of the project is planned to begin construction in late 2024 and be completed the following year.

The second phase of the TREX program is focused on creating a centralized TSA screening checkpoint and baggage claim, as well as an improved operations center. This central connection will also allow easier navigation between the A/B and C concourses. As of January 2023, the 145,000 square foot Central Hall is estimated to cost $179 million and has a planned construction timeline of 2025 to 2027. Other projects planned in the TREX program include relocation of the rental car facilities, and renovation of the A/B concourse.

The airport received $6.5 million from the 2021 Bipartisan Infrastructure Law to help fund the project.

== Facilities ==
=== Airfield ===
The airport covers 6,140 acres (2,480 ha) and operates two paved runways:

- Runway 3/21: 11,002 ft × 150 ft (3,353 m × 46 m), asphalt/concrete
- Runway 8/26: 8,199 ft × 150 ft (2,499 m × 46 m), asphalt

=== Tower ===
It is believed that the tower is the only federally-run air traffic control tower named for any single person. That honor was bestowed in 2010 on Ray Daves, the World War II radioman who survived Pearl Harbor and Midway and went on to serve as an air traffic controller in Spokane after the war until the 1970s.

=== Terminals ===
Terminals at Spokane International Airport

The passenger terminal facility at Spokane International Airport has three main structures; Concourse A and B in the center, Concourse C to the southwest, and the Ground Transportation Center to the north. The three structures are immediately adjacent and connected, however the two concourse structures are not linked with an airside connector on the sterile side; as such, connecting passengers need to transit between Concourse A-B and Concourse C through the landside, non-sterile circulation.

==== Concourse A/B ====
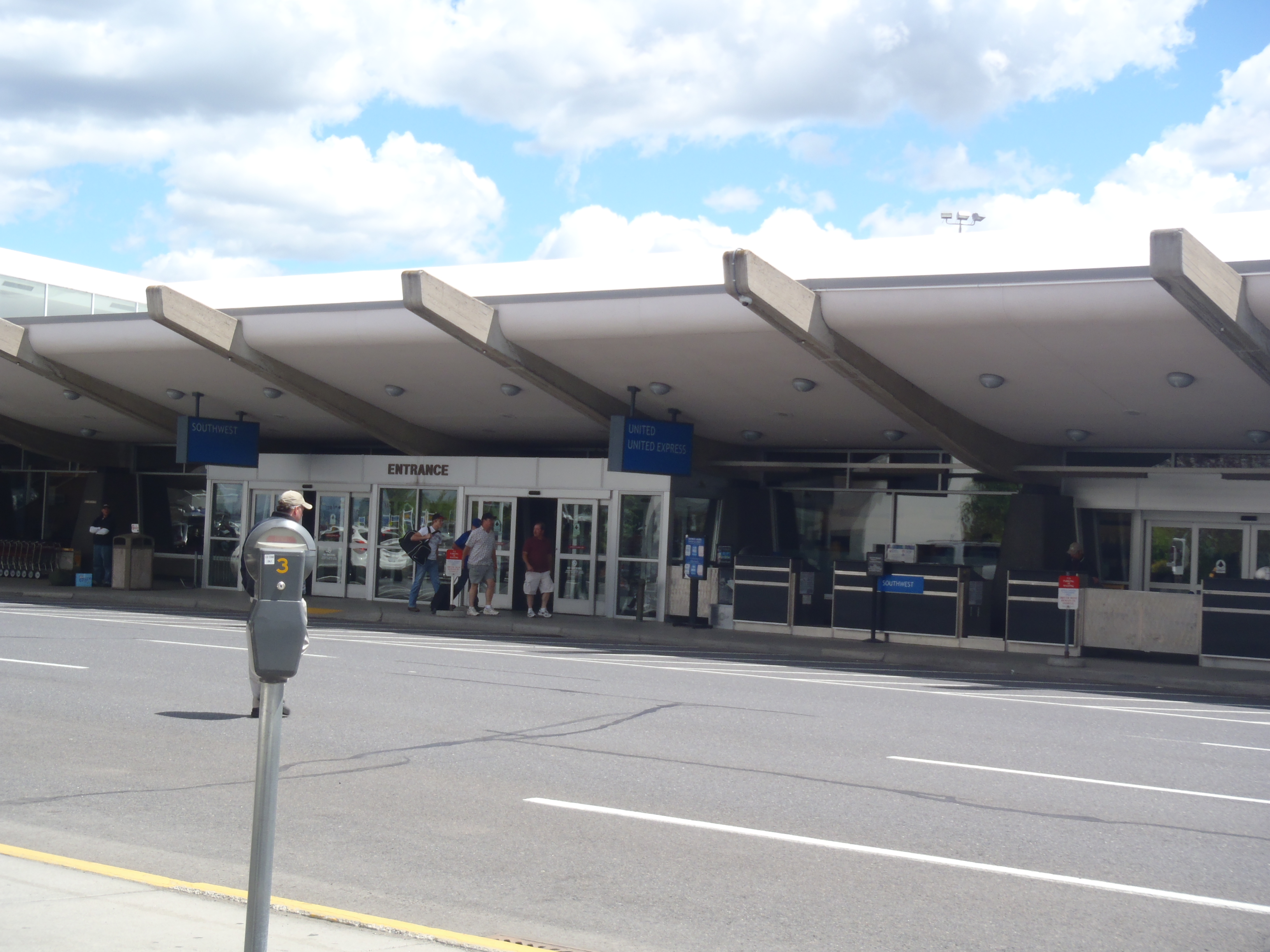
Entrance to the Concourse A-B ticketing area

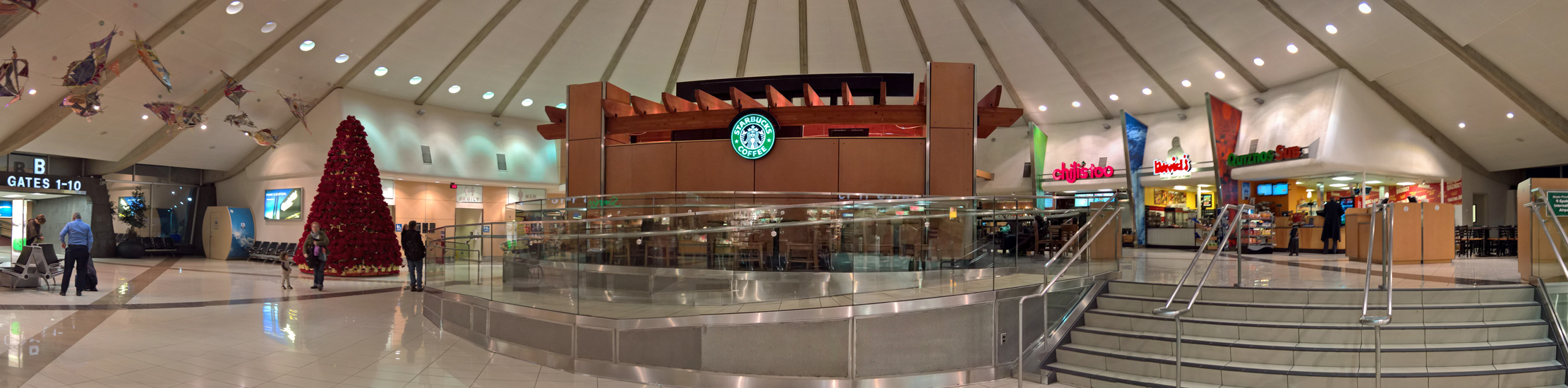
View of the Rotunda in Concourse A-B

The 1965 Concourse A/B complex includes the two concourses linked by a central rotunda area with dining and shopping vendors. The 37,000 ft^{2} (3,400 m^{2}) rotunda is supported entirely along its perimeter and features no obstructions. Concourse A houses 5 gates (11-15), while Concourse B houses 8 gates (1–8).

The Concourse A-B complex originally opened on April 1, 1965, and was designed by Warren C. Heylman and William Trogdon. The new terminal cost a reported US$4,600,000 (equivalent to $47,000,000 in 2025) and was dedicated on May 8, 1965, in a ceremony attended by Senator Warren Magnuson and Civil Aeronautics Board chair Alan Boyd. Designed in the Neo-Expressionism style, the building's architecture prominently features exposed concrete as well as distinct sculpted and monolithic architectural shapes and forms.

As the airport has continued to incrementally expand, some of the original architectural intent of the Concourse A-B complex has been lost. While several expansions to the concourse extended the building's original architectural style, other additions have altered it. In 1974, a second floor was added to both Concourses A and B to allow for the implementation of passenger boarding bridge access to aircraft. The new floors, while sharing some material commonality with the original Heylman and Trogdon concourse, lacked the same curvy and sculpted neo-expressionistic forms. The later additions of the ground transportation facility and Concourse C to the ends of the concourse building further altered the architecture by replacing its distinct bookend elevations and entrances with corridors to the adjacent buildings. Interior renovations in the mid-2000s also replaced many of Concourse A-B complex's original sculpted forms and monolithic materials with more rectilinear forms and contemporary finish materials. Despite this, many of the original architectural elements remain integral to the space (such as the exposed concrete roof trusses and concrete columns), creating a juxtaposition between the newer elements and the original architecture.

Under the proposed Terminal Renovation and Expansion (TREX) program to accommodate projected growth, the separate baggage claim areas in Concourse A-B and Concourse C would be consolidated into a single baggage claim with five carousels, and A-B would receive a renovation. Ultimately, operations at A-B would wind down under long-term plans to construct a new terminal in 2030, at the earliest.

Southwest Airlines is the current primary occupant operating in and out of Concourse A. Delta and United Airlines both operate in and out of Concourse B. American Airlines operated in and out of Concourse B before relocating to Concourse C in March 2016.

==== Concourse C ====
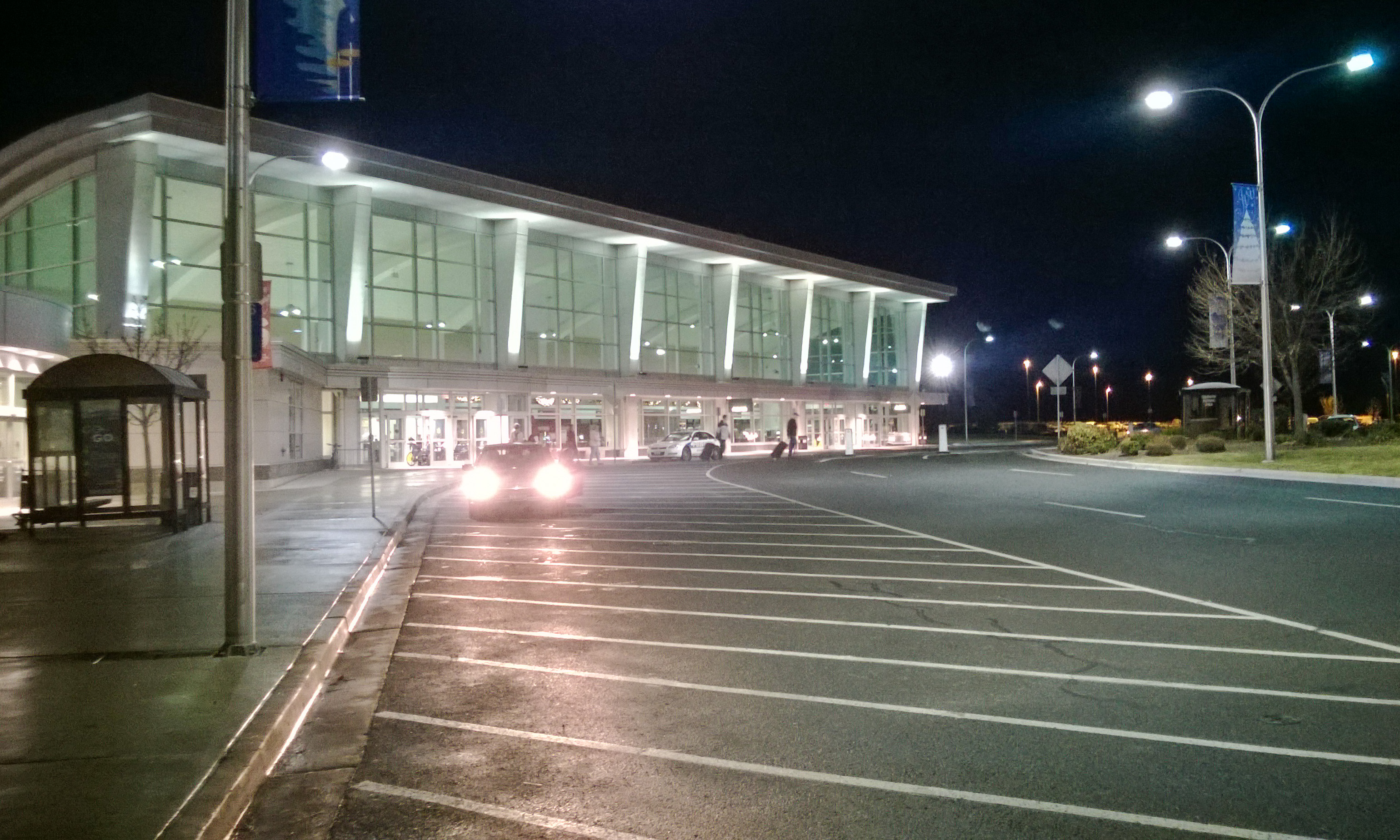
Concourse C

Concourse C houses 9 gates, both upper (30-32) and lower (21a, 21b, 22-26). The lower level gates house regional turboprop aircraft, while the upper-level gates house narrow-body aircraft. The current iteration of Concourse C opened in 2000 after a $20 million redevelopment and expansion project, designed by Bernardo-Wills Architects. The project, which broke ground in 1998 added 80,000 square feet (7,400 m^{2}) to the concourse including a new baggage claim and two-story passenger facility. The 11,000-square-foot (1,000 m^{2}) concourse was remodeled into service and operations functions. The new Concourse C has a more contemporary architectural style, contrasting the appearance of the Concourse A and B complex, by employing a large use of metal cladding and large curtain window walls on its exterior building envelope. However, it draws inspiration from its neo-expressionist neighbor by architecturally expressing a modular, repetitive, and exposed structural grid through its façade and interior lobby areas.

Alaska Airlines and its subsidiary carrier Horizon Air were the primary occupants operating in and out of Concourse C after Frontier Airlines ceased operations to Spokane in January 2015. However, that changed once American Airlines relocated to Concourse C in March 2016. Alaska and American operate in and out of the upper-level gates, while Horizon operates in and out of the lower level gates.

In October 2022, the airport broke ground on Phase 1 of the Terminal Renovation and Expansion (TREX) program which includes expansion of Concourse C. Phase one of the TREX project is completed, and later phases are currently under construction.

Additional Facilities

International Aerospace Coatings has a hangar on-site utilized by Southwest Airlines, Alaska Airlines, and other carriers for painting services.

== Airlines and destinations ==
=== Passenger ===
Airlines	Destinations
Alaska Airlines	Boise, Los Angeles, Orange County, Portland (OR), San Diego, San Francisco, Seattle/Tacoma; Seasonal: Anchorage, Honolulu (begins December 19, 2026)
Allegiant Air	Las Vegas, Phoenix/Mesa
American Airlines	Chicago–O'Hare, Dallas/Fort Worth, Phoenix–Sky Harbor
Delta Air Lines	Atlanta, Minneapolis/St. Paul, Salt Lake City, Seattle/Tacoma
Delta Connection	Los Angeles, Salt Lake City, Seattle/Tacoma
Southwest Airlines	Denver, Las Vegas, Oakland, Phoenix–Sky Harbor, Sacramento, San Jose (CA), San Diego; Seasonal: Chicago–Midway, Dallas-Love
United Airlines	Denver; Seasonal: Houston-Intercontinental, San Francisco
United Express	Chicago–O'Hare, Denver, San Francisco

=== Cargo ===
Airlines	Destinations
UPS Airlines	Louisville

Destinations map
Destinations from Spokane International Airport
Red = Year-round destination
Green = Seasonal destination
Blue = Future destination

Alaska destinations map
Destinations to the US State of Alaska. Red dots represent year-round destinations; green dots represent seasonal destinations; blue dots represent future destinations.

Hawaii destinations map
Hawaii destinations from SJC
Red = Year-round destination
Green = Seasonal destination
Blue = Future destination

== Statistics ==
=== Top destinations ===
Busiest domestic routes from GEG (September 2024 – August 2025)
Rank	City	Passengers	Carriers
1	(Washington (state)) Seattle/Tacoma, Washington	540,190	Alaska, Delta
2	Denver, Colorado	249,520	Southwest, United
3	Salt Lake City, Utah	155,270	Delta
4	Phoenix–Sky Harbor, Arizona	154,090	American, Southwest
5	Minneapolis/St. Paul, Minnesota	122,320	Delta, Sun Country
6	Portland, Oregon	113,950	Alaska
7	Las Vegas, Nevada	109,280	Allegiant, Southwest
8	Los Angeles, California	89,430	Alaska, Allegiant, Delta
9	(Georgia (U.S. state)) Atlanta, Georgia	80,030	Delta
10	Dallas/Fort Worth, Texas	79,660	American

=== Airline market share ===
Largest airlines at GEG (September 2024 – August 2025)
Rank	Airline	Passengers	Share
1	Southwest Airlines	951,000	22.70%
2	SkyWest Airlines	756,000	18.04%
3	Delta Air Lines	690,000	16.46%
4	Alaska Airlines	677,000	16.16%
5	Horizon Air	457,000	10.92%
	Other	659,000	15.73%

=== Annual traffic ===
Annual passenger traffic as reported by the Spokane International Airport (GEG).

View source data.

Annual passenger traffic (enplaned + deplaned) at GEG, 1990 through 2025
Year	Passengers	Year	Passengers	Year	Passengers	Year	Passengers
1990	1,619,880	2000	3,068,890	2010	3,176,204	2020	1,926,159
1991	1,589,123	2001	2,880,186	2011	3,076,554	2021	3,280,062
1992	1,855,954	2002	2,745,788	2012	3,005,664	2022	3,920,972
1993	2,329,953	2003	2,789,505	2013	2,926,858	2023	4,131,266
1994	2,687,482	2004	3,059,069	2014	2,986,652	2024	4,264,875
1995	2,988,575	2005	3,197,440	2015	3,133,342	2025	4,350,330
1996	3,258,762	2006	3,224,423	2016	3,234,095	2026	
1997	3,043,238	2007	3,471,901	2017	3,550,912	2027	
1998	2,949,833	2008	3,423,500	2018	3,998,272	2028	
1999	3,041,626	2009	3,055,081	2019	4,036,920	2029	

== Ground transportation ==
Spokane Transit operates four stops at Spokane International Airport, with bus routes 60 and 63. The airport is also served by the WSDOT's Travel Washington Gold Line, Northwestern Trailways, Wheatland Express, Queen City Shuttle, and Special Mobility Service.

A consolidated rental car facility is located adjacent to the Ground Transportation Center on the north end of the main terminal. The consolidated facility opened in November 2008, replacing several satellite operations, and is intended to meet passenger growth at the airport for 20 years after its opening.

== Accidents and incidents ==
- On March 10, 1961, a U.S. Air Force F-106 Delta Dart crashed three miles (5 km) west of Medical Lake while attempting to return to Geiger Field, killing its pilot.
- Six months later on September 14, 1961, a USAF F-106 crashed on approach to Geiger Field, killing its pilot.
- On February 18, 1972, a Beechcraft Model 99A, Cascade Airways Flight 325, operating Seattle-Walla Walla-Pullman-Spokane, crashed in fog at 9:42 pm PST during its instrument approach to Spokane International Airport, and came to rest in a muddy field less than two miles (3 km) southwest of the runway. Two passengers and two crew were aboard, and all survived with minor injuries. The pilot walked from the crash site to a nearby service station to report it. The crash site was about 200 yards (180 m) from the Medical Lake exit (#272) of Interstate 90 and the landing gear of the plane was extended. Due to fog, the flight had stopped in Pasco rather than Walla Walla.
- On January 20, 1981, a Beechcraft Model 99A, Cascade Airways Flight 201, crashed into a hill 4.5 miles (7 km) from the runway. The accident was caused by an incorrect distance measuring equipment frequency and premature descent to minimum descent altitude. Of the nine on board, seven were killed (including both pilots), and the surviving two passengers were seriously injured. The airline ceased operations about five years later.
- On March 18, 1994, a Douglas DC-3C of Salair crashed shortly after take-off on a cargo flight to Portland, killing both pilots. The starboard engine failed shortly after take-off; it had previously been in long-term storage and had been overhauled the previous year and fitted to the aircraft on February 21, replacing an engine that developed a misfire and loss of power. It had accumulated 15 hours flight time at the time of the accident. The aircraft was destroyed in the subsequent fire.
- On January 4, 1996, a Convair CV-440, operated by Salair on a positioning flight, lost power in both engines at 500 feet on an ILS approach to runway 3 due to fuel starvation and false fuel readings and darkness. The plane performed a forced landing, struck a berm in a field and was substantially damaged. Both occupants survived, but the aircraft was written off.
- Four days later, on January 8, 1996, A Cessna 401A, operated by Pacific States Charter Service, an air ambulance flight transporting a dying patient, crashed on an instrument landing system approach to GEG in darkness and adverse weather conditions, hitting a pole then flying into a building and burned. There were three fatalities out of the four on board, the paramedic survived.

== See also ==
- List of airports in Washington
- Washington World War II Army Airfields
- Western Air Defense Force (Air Defense Command)
- 9th Air Division
