= 2021 World Paragliding Championships =

- Venue: Loma Bola
- Location: San Miguel de Tucumán, Argentina
- Dates: 31 October – 13 November
- Competitors: 150 from 37 nations

The 17th World Paragliding Championships was held from 31 October to 13 November 2021 in San Miguel de Tucumán, Argentina. In this competition started 150 pilots from 37 nations.

== Medalists ==
Event	Gold	Silver	Bronze
Overall	Russell Ogden (GBR)	Honorin Hamard (FRA)	Luc Armant (FRA)
Women	Yael Margelisch (SUI)	Seiko Fukuoka (FRA)	Klaudia Bułgakow (POL)
Nation	United Kingdom; Russell Ogden; Theo Warden; Juan Ospina; Martin Long	Switzerland; Yael Margelisch; Christoph Dunkel; Stephan Morgenthaler; Emanuelle Zufferey; Sepp Inniger	Czech Republic; Jan Jareš; Stanislav Mayer; Petr Kostrhun; Petra Slívová; Pavel Iker

== Tasks ==
Task	Goal	Start	Notes	Results		
Task 1	63.0 km	3 Nov, 15:30		Open	Women	Nations
Task 2	~~66.8 km~~	~~4 Nov, 13:00~~	Cancelled			
Task 3	70.3 km	6 Nov, 14:00		Open	Women	Nations
Task 4	69.2 km	7 Nov, 13:00		Open	Women	Nations
Task 5	55.1 km	8 Nov, 12:30		Open	Women	Nations
Task 6	51.3 km	11 Nov, 14:30		Open	Women	Nations
Task 7	80.1 km	12 Nov, 12:15		Open	Women	Nations

== Results ==
=== Overall ===
Rank	Name	Nation	Tasks						Score
Rank	Name	Nation	T1	T3	T4	T5	T6	T7	Score
1st place, gold medalist(s)	Russell Ogden	United Kingdom	411.3/~~693.9~~	993.6	982.3	782.0	683.7	~~924.3~~	3852.9
2nd place, silver medalist(s)	Honorin Hamard	France	721.6	993.5	978.4	~~93.6~~	668.7	456.7/~~938.5~~	3818.9
3rd place, bronze medalist(s)	Luc Armant	France	715.4	979.9	977.5	~~297.8~~	670.2	470.6/~~967.0~~	3813.6
4	Julien Wirtz	France	198.9/~~680.8~~	992.7	983.1	~~76.2~~	669.2	962.2	3806.1
5	Jurij Vidic	Slovenia	108.6/~~693.7~~	983.0	974.8	751.7	~~594.2~~	981.0	3799.1
6	Juan Ospina	United Kingdom	711.6	983.0	978.5	~~94.2~~	641.4	452.7/~~930.2~~	3767.2
7	Christoph Dunkel	Switzerland	94.8/~~605.8~~	992.1	974.7	746.1	~~570.3~~	923.4	3731.1
8	Antun Lovrec	Croatia	683.2	977.8	953.9	745.4	~~631.9~~	361.6/~~931.1~~	3721.9
9	Daniel Tyrkas	Germany	679.9	974.2	960.9	747.5	~~577.2~~	358.9/~~924.2~~	3721.4
10	Stanislav Mayer	Czech Republic	~~444.0~~	974.8	966.1	749.1	639.0	391.4/~~910.6~~	3720.4
11	Caio Buzzarello	Brazil	680.8	987.6	964.7	~~79.9~~	642.8	442.3/~~908.9~~	3718.2
12	Gleb Sukhotskiy	Russian Air Sports Federation	681.3	988.2	966.2	~~93.3~~	142.4/~~571.5~~	933.1	3711.2
13	Jan Jareš	Czech Republic	~~660.5~~	963.8	971.6	731.1	642.6	401.0/~~932.9~~	3710.1
14	Jonas Böttcher	Germany	~~408.3~~	968.1	975.2	742.9	96.3/~~580.2~~	926.2	3708.7
15	Theo Warden	United Kingdom	~~643.1~~	986.9	944.0	741.6	100.7/~~606.4~~	935.0	3708.2
16	Martin Jovanoski	North Macedonia	674.2	983.3	967.4	~~73.2~~	154.1/~~618.4~~	923.8	3702.8
17	Gilmar de Jesus	Brazil	672.5	977.0	966.3	~~369.8~~	154.6/~~620.5~~	931.8	3702.2
18	Yael Margelisch	Switzerland	686.1	987.0	~~463.4~~	745.3	350.6/~~622.1~~	930.1	3699.1
19	Francisco Reina	Spain	690.7	987.0	971.0	~~41.0~~	127.1/~~510.2~~	918.1	3693.9
20	Rácz Balázs	Hungary	183.5/~~628.3~~	987.3	965.3	~~297.4~~	608.5	929.6	3674.2
21	William Pardis	Philippines	375.5/~~633.6~~	989.3	939.2	731.3	638.1	~~298.3~~	3673.4
22	Gilberto Raposo	Brazil	705.0	~~188.6~~	957.3	778.7	314.2/~~562.5~~	910.8	3666.0
23	Stefan Bernhard	Germany	685.1	~~195.3~~	970.6	742.2	337.1/~~603.5~~	925.6	3660.6
24	Seiko Fukuoka	France	153.7/~~526.1~~	977.6	958.8	~~297.1~~	629.3	931.4	3650.8
25	Hiroaki Kobayashi	Japan	689.1	951.5	~~809.6~~	748.8	326.9/~~580.1~~	928.8	3645.1
26	Lóránt Falucskai	Hungary	690.9	951.1	~~782.7~~	738.7	622.8	633.8/~~903.3~~	3637.3
27	Jacek Górski	Poland	377.4/~~636.7~~	948.6	974.7	718.4	609.2	~~294.0~~	3628.3
28	Edinson Álvarez	Colombia	688.1	322.5/~~839.0~~	963.1	728.7	~~574.8~~	909.6	3612.0
29	Miha Vovk	Slovenia	662.1	931.0	945.1	~~538.3~~	147.2/~~591.0~~	920.1	3605.5
30	Ulrich Prinz	Germany	138.7/~~474.9~~	981.4	971.8	~~292.1~~	577.1	930.3	3599.3
31	Jonáš Horáček	Czech Republic	688.0	984.2	851.7	~~186.3~~	144.9/~~581.6~~	926.2	3595.0
32	Paweł Faron	Poland	660.2	950.8	309.0/~~799.4~~	754.1	~~339.3~~	910.8	3584.9
33	Stephan Morgenthaler	Switzerland	119.1/~~407.9~~	859.8	975.8	~~249.7~~	629.9	1000.0	3584.6
34	Balázs Vértes	Hungary	601.6	955.0	973.5	~~539.7~~	125.3/~~503.0~~	928.4	3583.8
35	Klaudia Bułgakow	Poland	642.6	969.4	~~793.7~~	736.8	323.7/~~574.3~~	910.9	3583.4
36	Philipp Haag	Germany	725.2	~~541.3~~	972.1	323.9/~~527.5~~	620.0	939.3	3580.5
37	Jouni Makkonen	Finland	118.9/~~407.0~~	979.0	960.6	~~41.0~~	571.9	923.8	3554.2
38	Rafael Saladini	Brazil	113.9/~~389.9~~	836.0	992.2	~~93.3~~	632.7	973.5	3548.3
39	Sigmund Aamodt	Norway	673.3	929.1	392.9/~~810.0~~	~~41.0~~	642.4	885.7	3523.4
40	Nelson Pacheco	Portugal	701.2	958.1	381.7/~~786.9~~	~~70.6~~	572.5	908.0	3521.5
41	Paweł Chrząszcz	Poland	643.8	837.5	972.7	~~41.0~~	141.1/~~566.5~~	920.5	3515.6
42	José Rebelo	Portugal	635.8	954.7	406.9/~~838.9~~	~~545.0~~	599.8	917.5	3514.7
43	Petr Kostrhun	Czech Republic	686.7	955.4	840.4	~~74.7~~	90.4/~~363.0~~	941.1	3514.0
44	Lim Moon-seob	South Korea	594.4	968.4	967.3	~~70.1~~	88.7/~~356.2~~	894.3	3513.1
45	Franz Schilter	Peru	~~435.1~~	979.7	957.6	144.8/~~534.6~~	501.1	923.9	3507.1
46	Hans Guðmundsson	Iceland	680.3	930.2	844.2	~~194.1~~	135.7/~~544.7~~	914.9	3505.3
47	Marcella Uchoa	Brazil	699.7	968.8	364.7/~~751.8~~	~~41.0~~	569.9	887.3	3490.4
48	Pierre Remy	France	689.6	992.7	977.8	~~93.8~~	618.2	192.2/~~394.9~~	3470.5
49	Oh Seok-chul	South Korea	708.9	959.8	964.2	235.0/~~377.7~~	600.8	~~469.0~~	3468.7
50	Ernesto Hinestroza	Germany	674.5	986.1	960.0	~~297.6~~	564.0	267.1/~~548.9~~	3451.7
51	Nao Nariyama	Japan	582.7	946.6	375.6/~~774.3~~	~~529.8~~	626.4	920.1	3451.4
52	Vladimir Nedelkovski	North Macedonia	601.3	985.7	863.3	0.0	87.6/~~351.5~~	913.4	3451.3
53	Dominic Rohner	Switzerland	132.6/~~453.8~~	920.5	957.6	~~88.3~~	503.3	926.3	3440.3
54	Martin Long	United Kingdom	633.6	260.3/~~538.6~~	952.0	~~41.0~~	617.6	961.9	3425.4
55	Bojan Gaberšek	Slovenia	684.5	~~195.7~~	955.5	268.3/~~436.9~~	609.7	906.4	3424.4
56	Damir Habek	Croatia	596.8	966.3	869.6	~~41.0~~	94.2/~~378.1~~	889.0	3415.9
57	Emanuelle Zufferey	Switzerland	673.5	915.7	~~454.3~~	335.9/~~543.2~~	578.4	911.1	3414.6
58	Alexander Schalber	Austria	122.6/~~419.8~~	969.7	815.6	~~438.2~~	581.1	924.3	3413.3
59	Nanda Walliser	Switzerland	~~346.0~~	843.9	327.5/~~765.0~~	740.8	582.4	906.8	3401.4
60	Thorsten Siegel	Germany	700.1	~~27.8~~	965.6	168.3/~~274.0~~	621.1	919.2	3374.3
61	Federico Rodríguez	Argentina	674.5	373.5/~~531.5~~	960.6	748.4	571.7	~~81.8~~	3328.7
62	Dan Morand	Switzerland	285.8/~~489.5~~	~~222.0~~	812.1	738.7	570.7	920.7	3328.0
63	Andy MacRae	United States	25.8/~~88.2~~	948.7	851.4	~~42.1~~	579.1	887.1	3292.1
64	Jože Molek	Slovenia	673.4	110.8/~~229.2~~	961.5	~~154.1~~	605.1	930.2	3281.0
65	Nuno Virgílio	Portugal	249.5/~~420.9~~	976.4	952.4	544.6	558.0	~~461.4~~	3280.9
66	Carlos Hernández	Colombia	665.7	92.2/~~190.8~~	961.0	~~66.2~~	599.9	917.0	3235.8
67	Félix Rodríguez	Spain	671.4	114.5/~~237.0~~	967.8	~~142.2~~	543.8	919.6	3217.1
68	Carlos Lopes	Portugal	~~245.4~~	915.5	800.5	743.3	504.1	232.6/~~541.1~~	3196.0
69	Ronnie Koerich	Brazil	679.4	~~391.9~~	854.4	533.8	214.0/~~383.1~~	910.1	3191.7
70	Pablo Menchero	Spain	675.1	960.9	324.1/~~460.6~~	724.8	498.5	~~268.3~~	3183.4
71	John Cady	United States	599.0	982.6	95.6/~~197.0~~	~~77.2~~	574.5	897.2	3148.9
72	Michał Gierlach	Poland	563.2	979.4	962.5	~~57.8~~	601.0	37.5/~~77.1~~	3143.6
73	Stefan Brandlehner	Austria	669.0	193.9/~~401.2~~	943.2	~~52.2~~	497.0	837.9	3141.0
74	Park Jung-hun	South Korea	664.3	840.1	820.8	~~41.0~~	619.7	178.5/~~366.8~~	3123.4
75	Cristiano Silva	Brazil	668.3	958.9	963.3	~~41.0~~	353.5	176.2/~~362.1~~	3120.2
76	Simon Mettetal	France	695.7	948.2	969.0	~~93.5~~	360.4	136.8/~~281.2~~	3110.1
77	Pavel Iker	Czech Republic	634.5	898.6	798.4	~~140.8~~	632.0	132.5/~~272.2~~	3096.0
78	Luis Martínez	Spain	673.5	534.7	842.0	~~41.0~~	85.2/~~341.8~~	958.5	3093.9
79	Pál Takáts	Hungary	653.4	959.3	759.3	~~41.0~~	571.4	105.4/~~216.6~~	3048.8
80	Lambert Baptiste	France	691.8	537.5	942.2	748.7	114.2/~~201.1~~	~~281.9~~	3034.4
81	Jan Hansen	Norway	456.2	375.8/~~537.1~~	~~456.2~~	750.0	518.7	910.2	3010.9
82	Alexey Bystritskiy	Russian Air Sports Federation	350.0	957.9	824.3	730.0	~~163.0~~	142.1/~~366.0~~	3004.3
83	António Fonseca	Portugal	346.3	964.5	974.9	538.2	~~275.6~~	163.7/~~421.6~~	2987.6
84	Michel Guillemot	Argentina	429.1	~~535.7~~	789.0	747.7	629.0	383.0/~~548.5~~	2977.8
85	Magnus Eriksson	Sweden	667.4	874.9	758.1	~~520.5~~	210.7	156.5/~~403.1~~	2977.4
86	Álvaro Lucero	Argentina	623.1	~~222.8~~	976.0	515.7	579.5	278.9/~~399.5~~	2973.2
87	Rok Kaver	Slovenia	661.4	877.7	314.3/~~446.6~~	533.2	577.5	~~420.5~~	2964.1
88	Sepp Inniger	Switzerland	414.1	877.8	862.5	~~88.8~~	500.6	273.4/~~561.8~~	2928.4
89	Aleksandar Gacevski	North Macedonia	624.8	915.3	115.0/~~237.1~~	~~67.6~~	346.6	912.0	2913.7
89	Geir Tafjord	Norway	414.0	94.5/~~195.5~~	927.4	~~41.0~~	561.8	916.0	2913.7
91	Petra Slívová	Czech Republic	419.4	969.0	822.1	~~204.3~~	507.0	191.4/~~393.4~~	2908.9
92	Andreas Malecki	Germany	566.2	964.3	824.6	~~176.1~~	333.6	212.2/~~436.1~~	2900.9
93	Christian Amon	Austria	451.3	91.3/~~189.0~~	812.4	~~41.0~~	606.4	926.6	2888.0
94	Marko Milutinović	Serbia	701.1	946.2	454.2	~~46.1~~	578.6	207.5/~~426.5~~	2887.6
95	Javier Funes	Argentina	538.8	828.6	779.4	284.2/~~456.7~~	428.3	~~184.7~~	2859.3
96	Veselin Ovcharov	Bulgaria	669.6	~~189.0~~	783.4	239.4/~~389.8~~	581.7	550.1	2824.2
97	Kim Sang-tae	South Korea	577.4	848.6	825.1	159.6/~~256.4~~	382.8	~~261.3~~	2793.5
98	Katalin Juhász	Hungary	395.2	960.2	781.8	~~41.0~~	598.9	34.6/~~71.0~~	2770.7
99	Bogdan Bialka	Ireland	623.2	954.9	454.0	~~41.0~~	575.3	110.5/~~227.1~~	2717.9
100	Idris Birch	United Kingdom	82.6/~~282.7~~	538.5	967.2	~~41.8~~	555.7	508.3	2652.3
101	Moon Byeong-kuk	South Korea	575.3	116.4/~~240.9~~	838.1	~~41.0~~	270.2	841.8	2641.8
102	Chris Cote	United States	593.0	0.0	997.0	66.0/~~107.5~~	515.5	456.7	2628.2
103	Stephane Juncker	South Africa	230.2/~~388.4~~	536.5	768.2	515.2	555.3	~~68.7~~	2605.4
104	Aleksei Korobkov	Russian Air Sports Federation	639.6	965.4	751.7	25.5/~~41.0~~	217.9	~~47.3~~	2600.1
105	Cristóbal Orezzoli	Chile	623.2	946.3	60.4/~~124.6~~	~~68.9~~	493.9	474.0	2597.8
106	Daria Krasnova	Russian Air Sports Federation	597.3	792.1	750.8	~~41.0~~	419.0	31.9/~~65.6~~	2591.1
107	Michael Sommerauer	Austria	572.2	94.5/~~195.5~~	979.2	~~41.0~~	386.8	541.8	2574.5
108	Bence Halász	Hungary	406.7	929.4	756.8	~~41.0~~	357.6	121.4/~~249.5~~	2571.9
109	Keiko Hiraki	Japan	588.2	~~195.0~~	452.0	723.9	502.1	268.0/~~383.8~~	2534.2
110	Henry Alcázar	Colombia	338.4	949.9	311.6/~~442.8~~	530.7	337.5	~~209.8~~	2468.1
111	Denis Pogolsha	Russian Air Sports Federation	668.5	536.5	475.4	~~41.0~~	561.8	130.5/~~268.1~~	2372.7
112	Predrag Dudić	Serbia	375.4	957.4	852.0	~~41.0~~	148.6	39.1/~~80.3~~	2372.5
113	Yoshiaki Hirokawa	Japan	654.8	90.4/~~187.0~~	799.5	~~120.2~~	555.7	268.6	2369.0
114	Juho Komulainen	Finland	632.7	526.6	939.5	~~41.0~~	227.9	33.4/~~68.6~~	2360.1
115	Ole Rønneberg	Norway	664.5	195.9	828.5	~~41.0~~	569.2	34.1/~~70.0~~	2292.2
116	Željko Ovuka	Serbia	106.7/~~182.8~~	~~229.7~~	926.3	514.0	448.0	279.5	2274.5
117	Galen Kirkpatrick	United States	412.2	980.8	441.9	48.7/~~78.2~~	375.5	~~86.7~~	2259.1
118	Srđan Ristanović	Serbia	630.1	94.5/~~195.6~~	464.1	~~41.0~~	573.2	497.1	2259.0
119	Pablo Hernández	Argentina	652.7	535.2	452.4	42.7/~~68.6~~	569.4	~~65.5~~	2252.4
120	Ricardo Navarro	Venezuela	279.3	100.0/~~206.9~~	444.5	~~41.0~~	509.6	907.0	2240.4
121	Miguel Trotta	Argentina	403.1	110.5/~~228.6~~	779.2	0.0	534.9	353.1	2180.8
122	Andrés Vergara	Chile	186.0	831.4	821.1	~~65.6~~	21.3/~~85.4~~	266.6	2126.4
123	Kiyoshi Nariyama	Japan	247.4	90.6/~~187.4~~	953.2	~~41.0~~	526.6	261.8	2079.6
124	Marko Novak	Slovenia	688.8	98.9/~~140.8~~	970.7	117.6	199.7	~~88.8~~	2075.7
125	Marcos Rosenkjer	United States	178.3	533.2	796.3	0.0	495.7	33.4/~~68.6~~	2036.9
126	Rasa Grigoraitienė	Lithuania	341.9	854.8	132.4/~~188.1~~	519.4	162.4	~~73.3~~	2010.9
127	Etienne Coupez	Luxembourg	582.3	318.0	421.7	~~41.0~~	565.5	119.6/~~245.7~~	2007.1
128	Miguel Díaz	Spain	635.7	196.9	456.5	~~41.0~~	631.0	42.0/~~86.4~~	1962.1
129	Vsevolod Alekin	Russian Air Sports Federation	570.5	13.4/~~27.8~~	452.9	0.0	500.7	421.6	1959.1
130	Germán Navia	Bolivia	563.0	968.9	201.7	~~41.0~~	183.5	36.1/~~74.1~~	1953.2
131	Adrián Acosta	Argentina	26.3/~~90.2~~	469.3	755.4	~~63.5~~	399.3	285.3	1935.6
132	Takuo Iwasaki	Japan	340.4	107.8/~~223.0~~	440.3	~~41.0~~	627.3	356.4	1872.2
133	Ari Sahlström	Finland	49.8/~~170.4~~	529.3	335.2	~~41.3~~	541.4	412.4	1868.1
134	Guillermo Velázquez	Colombia	416.2	87.1/~~180.2~~	445.4	~~69.2~~	403.8	507.2	1859.7
135	Bill Hughes	United States	~~133.3~~	85.8/~~201.4~~	416.9	727.1	424.5	203.0	1857.3
136	Frederic Clauss	Luxembourg	670.1	218.3	779.0	~~65.6~~	101.7	61.1/~~125.6~~	1830.2
137	Yassen Savov	Bulgaria	677.3	665.0	52.5/~~108.3~~	~~41.6~~	201.9	182.2	1778.9
138	Sami Pitkäkoski	Finland	25.8/~~88.2~~	186.6	342.0	~~41.0~~	567.2	496.2	1617.8
139	Isabel Bernal	Colombia	250.4	~~210.9~~	195.1/~~279.8~~	249.9	563.4	352.2	1611.0
140	Jan Rentowski	Poland	220.5	99.7/~~206.3~~	450.7	0.0	525.2	268.0	1564.1
141	Matthew Henzi	United States	584.2	32.3	~~33.6~~	26.0/~~42.1~~	328.9	86.7	1558.1
142	Elisabeth Egger	Austria	425.2	341.2	122.0/~~251.5~~	~~41.0~~	308.1	361.3	1557.8
143	Kalle Ojamo	Finland	381.7	233.1	796.9	78.6	–	–	1490.3
144	Guillermo Salazar	Colombia	171.3	532.1	234.7	~~41.0~~	21.3/~~85.4~~	201.6	1161.0
145	Kim Hyun-hee	South Korea	51.5/~~88.2~~	~~117.4~~	444.3	103.1	155.5	391.7	1146.1
146	Shauin Kao	Argentina	463.1	~~69.4~~	298.4	42.2/~~68.7~~	201.2	123.0	1127.9
147	Owen Shoemaker	United States	26.9/~~92.0~~	187.0	447.5	~~96.4~~	159.5	217.1	1038.0
148	Scott Torkelsen	Denmark	276.9	141.5	255.2	0.0	107.7	–	781.3
149	Rodrigo Wulliamoz	Chile	88.2	216.6	297.4	~~41.0~~	85.4	34.6/~~71.1~~	722.2
150	David Snowden	Australia	95.7	184.9	104.0	~~50.2~~	186.4	48.2/~~99.0~~	619.2

=== Women ===
Rank	Name	Nation	Tasks						Score
Rank	Name	Nation	T1	T3	T4	T5	T6	T7	Score
1st place, gold medalist(s)	Yael Margelisch	Switzerland	686.1	987.0	~~463.4~~	745.3	350.6/~~622.1~~	930.1	3699.1
2nd place, silver medalist(s)	Seiko Fukuoka	France	153.7/~~526.1~~	977.6	958.8	~~297.1~~	629.3	931.4	3650.8
3rd place, bronze medalist(s)	Klaudia Bułgakow	Poland	642.6	969.4	~~793.7~~	736.8	323.7/~~574.3~~	910.9	3583.4
4	Marcella Uchoa	Brazil	699.7	968.8	364.7/~~751.8~~	~~41.0~~	569.9	887.3	3490.4
5	Nao Nariyama	Japan	582.7	946.6	375.6/~~774.3~~	~~529.8~~	626.4	920.1	3451.4
6	Emanuelle Zufferey	Switzerland	673.5	915.7	~~454.3~~	335.9/~~543.2~~	578.4	911.1	3414.6
7	Nanda Walliser	Switzerland	~~346.0~~	843.9	327.5/~~765.0~~	740.8	582.4	906.8	3401.4
8	Park Jung-hun	South Korea	664.3	840.1	820.8	~~41.0~~	619.7	178.5/~~366.8~~	3123.4
9	Petra Slívová	Czech Republic	419.4	969.0	822.1	~~204.3~~	507.0	191.4/~~393.4~~	2908.9
10	Katalin Juhász	Hungary	395.2	960.2	781.8	~~41.0~~	598.9	34.6/~~71.0~~	2770.7
11	Daria Krasnova	Russian Air Sports Federation	597.3	792.1	750.8	~~41.0~~	419.0	31.9/~~65.6~~	2591.1
12	Keiko Hiraki	Japan	588.2	~~195.0~~	452.0	723.9	502.1	268.0/~~383.8~~	2534.2
13	Galen Kirkpatrick	United States	412.2	980.8	441.9	48.7/~~78.2~~	375.5	~~86.7~~	2259.1
14	Rasa Grigoraitienė	Lithuania	341.9	854.8	132.4/~~188.1~~	519.4	162.4	~~73.3~~	2010.9
15	Isabel Bernal	Colombia	250.4	~~210.9~~	195.1/~~279.8~~	249.9	563.4	352.2	1611.0
16	Elisabeth Egger	Austria	425.2	341.2	122.0/~~251.5~~	~~41.0~~	308.1	361.3	1557.8
17	Kim Hyun-hee	South Korea	51.5/~~88.2~~	~~117.4~~	444.3	103.1	155.5	391.7	1146.1
18	Shauin Kao	Argentina	463.1	~~69.4~~	298.4	42.2/~~68.7~~	201.2	123.0	1127.9

=== Nation ===
Rank	Nation	Score
1st place, gold medalist(s)	United Kingdom	10092.4
2nd place, silver medalist(s)	Switzerland	9962.7
3rd place, bronze medalist(s)	Czech Republic	9864.5
4	Poland	9732.7
5	Brazil	9616.0
6	Hungary	9598.3
7	Slovenia	9586.1
8	Colombia	9327.5
9	Germany	9272.5
10	France	9248.2
11	Spain	9132.0
12	Portugal	8829.6
13	South Korea	8823.6
14	Croatia	8664.1
15	Norway	8388.7
16	Russian Air Sports Federation	8349.6
17	Japan	8273.9
18	Austria	8063.3
19	North Macedonia	8046.6
20	Argentina	7987.3
21	Serbia	7648.6
22	Finland	7017.5
23	United States	6373.4
24	Chile	5159.8
25	Bulgaria	5039.9
26	Peru	4332.0
27	Philippines	4229.8
28	Luxembourg	4134.5
29	Iceland	4108.4
30	Sweden	3434.7
31	Ireland	2875.5
32	South Africa	2832.3
33	Venezuela	2388.3
34	Lithuania	2139.9
35	Bolivia	2032.2
36	Denmark	781.3
37	Australia	720.2
