= Flyability =

Charity that paraglides with disabled people

- Flyability logo
- Established: 1996
- Type: Charitable organisation
- Registration no.: England and Wales: 1059197
- Purpose: Hang Gliding and Paragliding for Disabled People
- Region served: United Kingdom
- Method: Equipment Loans, Training Scholarships
- Facebook: https://www.facebook.com/flyability/
- Twitter: https://twitter.com/flyabilityuk
- YouTube: https://www.youtube.com/channel/UCEYtFGvJz3iqxfsdH7GTgTA
- Affiliations: British Hang Gliding and Paragliding Association
- Staff: 0 (2017)
- Volunteers: 6 (2017)
- Website: www.flyability.org.uk

Flyability is a UK based charity that works to help disabled people fly hang gliders and paragliders. It is the disability initiative of the British Hang Gliding and Paragliding Association, the governing body of hang gliding and paragliding in the UK.

Schools with close links to Flyability include Airways Airsports, EscapeXC and Flying Frenzy

== History ==
Registered on 13 November 1996 by Steve Varden, John Crosbie, Pamela Hughes and Mark Hastings. This followed an intensive period of organising and fundraising within the hang gliding and paragliding community.

Flyability works closely with British Disabled Flying Association (now Aerobility). Flyability is one of the chosen charities of Access Unlimited. Generous donations from the Lakes Charity Classic event allowed Flyability to expand into offering pilot scholarships with continued financial support over the years.

== Flyability Activities ==
=== Equipment loans ===
Flyability loans out specialist equipment to BHPA schools for training disabled people. This includes a range of paragliding buggies including the Flychair, the Swanton, the Chevron paragliding wheelchair and the Sanderson. Flyability was involved in encouraging the development of some of these buggies and has passed some of their older buggies onto disabled flying organisations in other countries. One Sanderson buggy has even got as far as New Zealand where Making Trax and Infinity Paragliding use it.

=== Pilot Scholarships ===
Flyability offers scholarships for tandem flights and Elementary and Club Pilot training.

=== Events ===
Flyability has a presence at a number of flying events around the UK. Recent events have included Farnborough 2016 and Flyer Live 2016 on the Aerobility stands. Flyability also attended and was a beneficiary of the Richard Westgate Memorial Fly-in in 2013

Flyability and Aerobility ran a combined "Try Everything!" event in June 2016 offering flights for disabled people in hang gliders, microlights and aerobatic gliders and motor gliders.

== Media ==
Flyability and their activities are often reported in national, local and specialist press reports.

=== National ===
- BBC – Flyability worked with Airways Airsports to take BBC Presenters Mike Bushell and Tony Garrett flying in a tandem hang glider to demonstrate how accessible the sport is.
- Guardian – Flyability referenced within an article introducing paragliding.

=== Local ===
- Two pilots from Guernsey train to fly paragliders in Dorset with Flying Frenzy with help from Flyability using the Sanderson and FlyChair buggies.

=== Specialist ===
- Skywings January 2006 – 1st Solo
- Skywings December 2016 – Buggy Boot Camp
- BHPA Elementary Pilot training guide
- A report in the Multiple Sclerosis Society magazine on a day of tandem flights for people with MS.
