= World Paragliding Championships =

Paragliding competition

World Paragliding Championships is the main competitive paragliding championships in the World, organized by the Fédération Aéronautique Internationale.

== Cross Country Paragliding ==
=== List of events ===
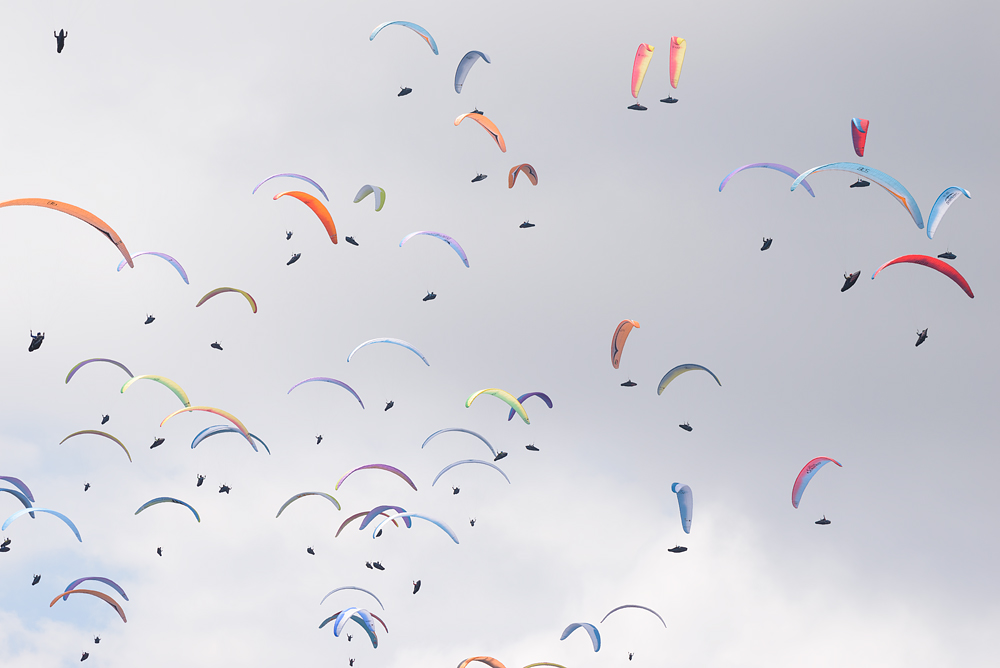
2017 World Paragliding Championships in Feltre (task Rubbio), Italy.

	Year	City	Country	Date	Venue	No. of Athletes	No. of Nations
1st	1989	Kössen	Austria				
2nd	1991	Digne-les-Bains	France				
3rd	1993	Verbier	Switzerland				
4th	1995	Kitakyushu	Japan				
5th	1997	Castejón de Sos	Spain				
6th	1999	Bramberg–Neukirchen	Austria				
7th	2001	Granada	Spain				
8th	2003	Larouco	Portugal				
9th	2005	Governador Valadares	Brazil	March 11–27			
10th	2007	Manilla	Australia	February 24–March 9			
11th	2009	El Peñón	Mexico	January 23–February 6			
12th	2011	Piedrahíta	Spain	July 3–16			
13th	2013	Sopot	Bulgaria	July 13–26			
14th	2015	Roldanillo	Colombia	January 10–25		148	38
15th	2017	Feltre	Italy	July 1–15		150	40
16th	2019	Kruševo	Macedonia	August 5–18		150	48
17th	2021	San Miguel de Tucumán	Argentina	November 2–12	Loma Bola	150	38
18th	2023	Chamoux-sur-Gelon	France	May 22–June 2		149	48
19th	2025	Castelo	Brazil	September 2–12		128	53

=== Overall ===
	Year	Hosts	Gold	Silver	Bronze
1st	1989	Austria			
2nd	1991	France	Robbie Whittall (GBR)	Andy Hediger (SUI)	Urs Haari (SUI)
3rd	1993	Switzerland	Hans Bollinger (SUI)	E Strobl (GER)	John Pendry (GBR)
4th	1995	Japan	Stefan Stiegler (AUT)	Hans Bollinger (SUI)	J. Sanderson (GBR)
5th	1997	Spain	John Pendry (GBR)	Christian Tammeger (AUT)	Jimmy Pacher (ITA)
6th	1999	Austria			
7th	2001	Spain	Luca Donini (ITA)	Christian Tammeger (AUT)	Olivier Rossel (CAN)
8th	2003	Portugal	Alex Hofer (SUI)	Frank Thoma Brown (BRA)	Masataka Kawachi (JPN)
9th	2005	Brazil	Steve Cox (SUI)	Christian Tammeger (AUT)	Stefan Wyss (SUI)
10th	2007	Australia	Bruce Goldsmith (GBR)	Jean-Marc Caron (FRA)	Thomas McCune (USA)
11th	2009	Mexico	Andy Aebi (SUI)	Stefan Wyss (SUI)	Aljaz Valic (SLO)
12th	2011	Spain	Charles Cazaux (FRA)	Luca Donin (ITA)	Andreas Malecki (GER)
13th	2013	Bulgaria	Jérémie Lager (FRA)	Charles Cazaux (FRA)	Davide Cassetta (ITA)
14th	2015	Colombia	Honorin Hamard (FRA)	Michael Maurer (SUI)	Torsten Siegel (GER)
15th	2017	Italy	Pierre Remy (FRA)	Guy Anderson (GBR)	Honorin Hamard (FRA); Jurij Vidic (SLO)
16th	2019	Macedonia	Joachim Oberhauser (ITA)	Gleb Sukhotsky (RUS)	Honorin Hamard (FRA)
17th	2021	Argentina	Russell Ogden (GBR)	Honorin Hamard (FRA)	Luc Armant (FRA)
18th	2023	France	Maxime Pinot (FRA)	Honorin Hamard (FRA)	Pierre Remy (FRA)
19th	2025	Brazil	Baptiste Lambert (FRA)	Honorin Hamard (FRA)	Marcelo Sanchez Vilchez (SPA)

=== Female ===
	Year	Hosts	Gold	Silver	Bronze
1st	1989	Austria			
2nd	1991	France			
3rd	1993	Switzerland	Camilla Perner (AUT)	Nathalie Berger (FRA)	Miyuki Tanaka (JPN)
4th	1995	Japan	Judy Leden (GBR)	Miyuki Tanaka (JPN)	Nathalie Berger (FRA)
5th	1997	Spain	Sandie Cochepain (FRA)	Claire Bernier (FRA)	Louise Crandal (GBR)
6th	1999	Austria			
7th	2001	Spain	Louise Crandal (GBR)	Nicole Nussbaum (SUI)	Miyuki Tanaka (JPN)
8th	2003	Portugal	Petra Krausova (CZE)	Nicole Nussbaum (SUI)	Louise Crandal (DEN)
9th	2005	Brazil	Louise Crandal (GBR)	Ewa Wisnierska-Cieslewicz (GER)	Elizabeth Rauchenberger (SUI)
10th	2007	Australia	Petra Slivova (CZE)	Viv Williams (AUS)	Harmony Gaw (NZL)
11th	2009	Mexico	Elisa Houdry (FRA)	Keiko Hiraki (JPN)	Anja Kröll (SUI)
12th	2011	Spain	Petra Krausova-Slivova (CZE)	Regula Strasser (GER)	Kirsty Cameron (GBR)
13th	2013	Bulgaria	Klaudia Bulgakow (POL)	Seiko Fukuoka (FRA)	Nicole Fedele (ITA)
14th	2015	Colombia	Seiko Fukuoka (FRA)	Keiko Hiraki (JPN)	Nicole Fedele (ITA)
15th	2017	Italy	Seiko Fukuoka (FRA)	Kari Ellis (AUS)	Silvia Buzzi Ferraris (ITA)
16th	2019	Macedonia	Meryl Delferriere (FRA)	Yael Margelisch (SUI)	Kari Ellis (AUS)
17th	2021	Argentina	Yael Margelisch (SUI)	Seiko Fukuoka (FRA)	Klaudia Bulgakow (POL)
18th	2023	France	Meryl Delferriere (FRA)	Constance Mettetal (FRA)	Nanda Walliser (SUI)
19th	2025	Brazil	Constance Mettetal (FRA)	Alexia Fischer (USA)	Keiko Hiraki (JPN)

=== Nations ===
	Year	Gold	Silver	Bronze
1st	1989			
2nd	1991	Switzerland	Great Britain	Germany
3rd	1993	Switzerland	Great Britain	Austria
4th	1995	Switzerland	Great Britain	Austria
5th	1997	Switzerland	Great Britain	Austria
6th	1999			
7th	2001	Switzerland	Germany	Italy
8th	2003	Switzerland	Austria	Germany
9th	2005	Switzerland	Germany	Czech Republic
10th	2007	Czech Republic	France	Switzerland
11th	2009	Czech Republic	Italy	Slovenia
12th	2011	France	Great Britain	Switzerland
13th	2013	France	Italy	Venezuela
14th	2015	Germany	Slovenia	Spain
15th	2017	France	Slovenia	Switzerland
16th	2019	France Italy		Japan
17th	2021	Great Britain	Switzerland	Czech Republic
18th	2023	France	Great Britain	North Macedonia
19th	2025	France	Spain	Italy

=== All-time medal table (1991–2025) ===
Updated after the 2025 World Paragliding Championships.

Rank	Nation	Gold	Silver	Bronze	Total
1	France	19	11	5	35
2	Switzerland	12	8	7	27
3	Great Britain	8	7	3	18
4	Czech Republic	4	0	2	6
5	Italy	2	4	8	14
6	Austria	2	4	3	9
7	Germany	1	5	4	10
8	Slovenia	1	2	3	6
9	Poland	1	0	1	2
10	Japan	0	3	5	8
11	Australia	0	2	1	3
12	Spain	0	1	2	3
13	United States	0	1	1	2
14	Brazil	0	1	0	1
14	Russia	0	1	0	1
16	Denmark	0	0	2	2
17	Canada	0	0	1	1
17	New Zealand	0	0	1	1
17	North Macedonia	0	0	1	1
17	Venezuela	0	0	1	1
Totals (20 entries)		50	50	51	151

== Paragliding Accuracy ==
=== List of events ===
	Year	City	Country	Date	Venue	No. of Athletes	No. of Nations
1st	2000	Middle Wallop	United Kingdom	August 12–19			
2nd	2003	Nova Gorica	Slovenia	August 4–10			
3rd	2005	Niš	Serbia and Montenegro	August 8–14			
4th	2007	Trakai	Lithuania	February 9–18			
5th	2009	Ivanec	Croatia	June 20–27			
6th	2011	Kunčice pod Ondřejníkem	Czech Republic	July 22–30			
7th	2013	Bjelasnica	Bosnia and Herzegovina	August 17–25			
8th	2015	Puncak	Indonesia	August 11–16			
9th	2017	Vlorë	Albania	May 6–13			
10th	2019	Vršac	Serbia	September 10–18			
11th	2021	Prilep	Macedonia	October 8–16		129	32
12th	2023	Sopot	Bulgaria	October 20-28		130	31
13th	2025	Alanya	Turkey	Oct 9-19		140	36
14th	2027	Nongkhai	Thailand				

=== Overall ===
	Year	Hosts	Gold	Silver	Bronze	
1st	2000	United Kingdom	John Eiff	Simeon Klokocovnik	Dave Fairey	
2nd	2003	Slovenia	Matjaz Feraric	Andy Shaw	David Sluga	
3rd	2005	Serbia and Montenegro	Jaka Gorenc	Matej Goste	Andy Shaw	
4th	2007	Lithuania	Matjaz Feraric	Andrew Webster	Martin Jovanoski	
5th	2009	Croatia	Shu Peng Zhang	Haiping Chen	Martin Ondrášek	
6th	2011	Czech Republic	Anton Svoljšak	Xiaoqiang Yang	Jaka Gorenc	
7th	2013	Bosnia and Herzegovina	Sheng Guang Q.	Jaka Gorenc	Tomáš Lednik	
8th	2015	Indonesia	Dede Supratman	Matjaz Sluga	(Slovenia); Anton; Svoljšak	(Czech Republic); Tomáš; Lednik
9th	2017	Albania	Tzvetan Tzolov	Matjaz Sluga	Haiping Chen	
10th	2019	Serbia	Yong Wu	Irvan Winarya	Matjaz Sluga	
11th	2021	Macedonia	Seungil Ahn	Vlastimil Vachtl	Dagyeom Lee	
12th	2023	Bulgaria	Yang Chen	Linus Schubert	Aris Afriansyah	
13th	2025	Turkey	Yang Chen	Xu Yu	Ivan Pavlov	

=== Female ===
	Year	Hosts	Gold	Silver	Bronze
1st	2000	United Kingdom			
2nd	2003	Slovenia	Aleksandra Klokocovnik	Pauline Behan	Natasa Marti
3rd	2005	Serbia and Montenegro	Markéta Tomášková	Sandra Ivanovic	Andrijana Joleska
4th	2007	Lithuania	Durusu Funda Cici	Kateřina Pánková	Olga Lonina
5th	2009	Croatia	Elena Kostova	Markéta Tomášková	Milica Bicanin
6th	2011	Czech Republic	Markéta Tomášková	Milica Marinković	Milica Bicanin
7th	2013	Bosnia and Herzegovina	Milica Marinković	Rimante Verbylaite	Jolanta Romanenko
8th	2015	Indonesia	Nunnapat Phuchong	Hye Joung Cho	Jolanta Romanenko
9th	2017	Albania	Nunnapat Phuchong	Markéta Tomášková	Rika Wijayanti
10th	2019	Serbia	Soyoung Cho	Eunyoung Cho	Georgiana Birgoz
11th	2021	Macedonia	Dagyeom Lee	Markéta Tomášková	Eunyoung Cho
12th	2023	Bulgaria	Eunyoung Cho	Catherine Devos	Donghwa Yang
13th	2025	Turkey	Karolína Koudelová	Markéta Tomášková	Lisjeta Thaqi

=== Nations ===
	Year	Hosts	Gold	Silver	Bronze
1st	2000	Great Britain	Great Britain	Slovenia	Nederland
2nd	2003	Slovenia	Slovenia	Great Britain	Lithuania
3rd	2005	Serbia and Montenegro	Slovenia	Great Britain	Czech Republic
4th	2007	Lithuania	Slovenia	Czech Republic	Great Britain
5th	2009	Croatia	Slovenia	China	Bulgaria
6th	2011	Czech Republic	Slovenia	Serbia	China
7th	2013	Bosnia and Herzegovina	Czech Republic	Bulgaria	Serbia
8th	2015	Indonesia	Thailand	Serbia	Indonesia
9th	2017	Albania	China	Serbia	Czech Republic
10th	2019	Serbia	Indonesia	China	Colombia
11th	2021	Macedonia	South Korea	Czech Republic	Slovenia
12th	2023	Bulgaria	Indonesia	Czech Republic	South Korea
13th	2025	Turkey	China	Indonesia	Kosovo

=== All-time medal table (2000–2023) ===
Updated after the 2023 World Paragliding Accuracy Championships.

Rank	Nation	Gold	Silver	Bronze	Total
1	Slovenia	10	6	5	21
2	China	6	5	2	13
3	Czech Republic	5	8	5	18
4	South Korea	5	2	4	11
5	Indonesia	3	2	3	8
6	Thailand	3	0	0	3
7	Bulgaria	2	1	1	4
8	Great Britain	1	5	3	9
9	Serbia	1	4	4	9
10	Germany	1	1	1	3
11	Poland	1	0	0	1
11	Turkey	1	0	0	1
11	United States	1	0	0	1
14	Lithuania	0	1	3	4
15	Serbia and Montenegro	0	1	1	2
16	Chile	0	1	0	1
16	France	0	1	0	1
18	Kosovo	0	0	2	2
18	North Macedonia	0	0	2	2
20	Colombia	0	0	1	1
20	Latvia	0	0	1	1
20	Netherlands	0	0	1	1
20	Romania	0	0	1	1
Totals (23 entries)		40	38	40	118
