= Paragliding =

Soaring with a paraglider

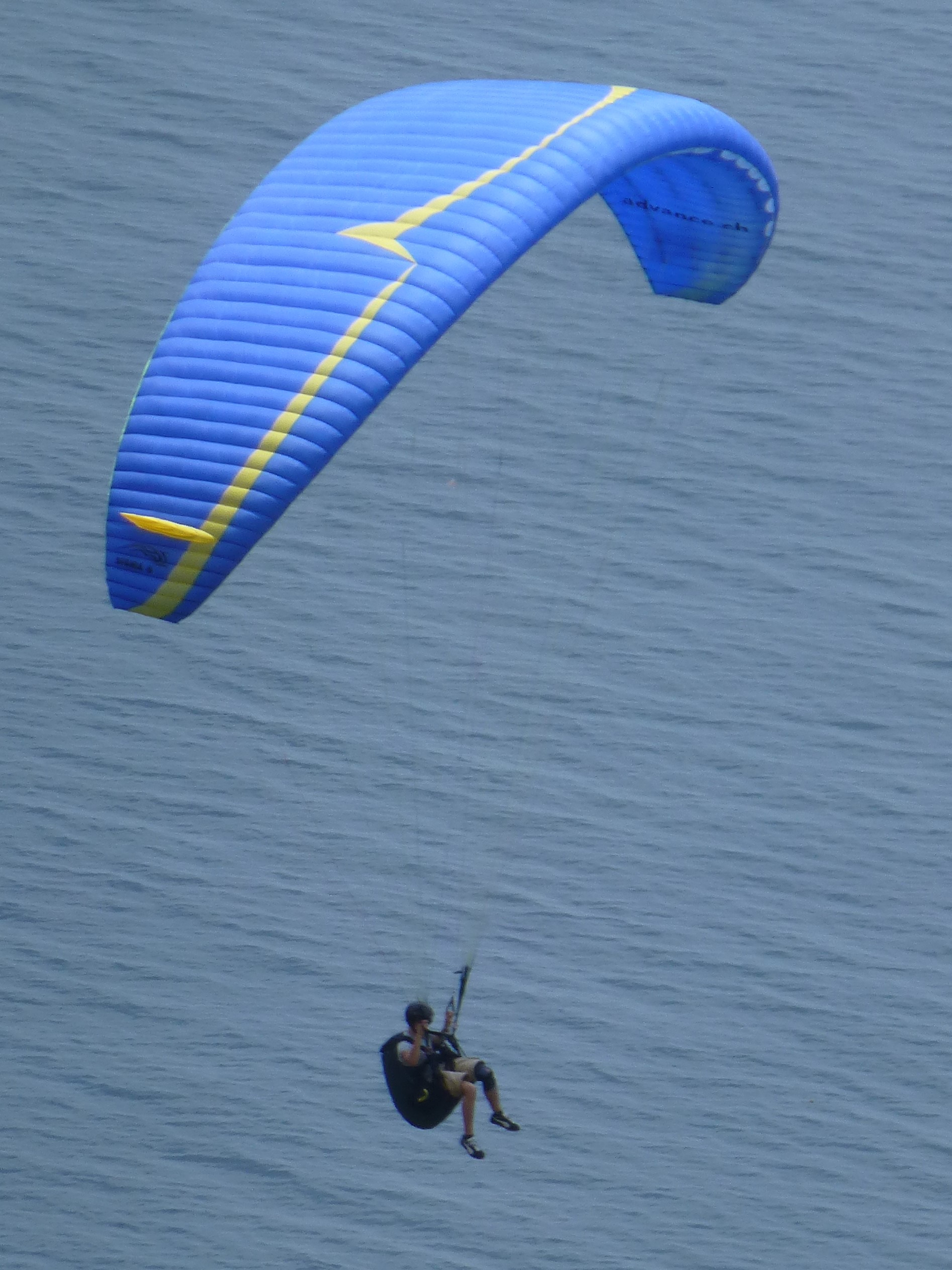
- Paragliding in Turkey (Advance canopy)
- Highest governing body: Fédération Aéronautique Internationale

Characteristics
- Contact: No
- Mixed-sex: Yes
- Type: Air sport

Presence
- Country or region: Worldwide
- Olympic: No
- World Games: 2013

Paragliding is a recreational and competitive extreme sport involving gliding using paragliders, which are lightweight, free-flying, foot-launched glider setup with no rigid primary structure. The pilot typically sits in a climbing harness or in a cocoon-like "pod" suspended below a fabric airfoil, typically a parafoil or a ram-air parachute. The airfoil shape is maintained by the suspension lines, the pressure of air entering vents in the front of the airfoil, and the aerodynamic forces of the air flowing over the outside.

Despite not using an propulsive engine, paraglider flights can last many hours and range for many hundreds of kilometres, though flights under five hours and covering some tens of kilometres are more the norm. By skillful exploitation of sources of lift, the pilot may gain height, often climbing to altitudes of a few thousand metres.

== History ==
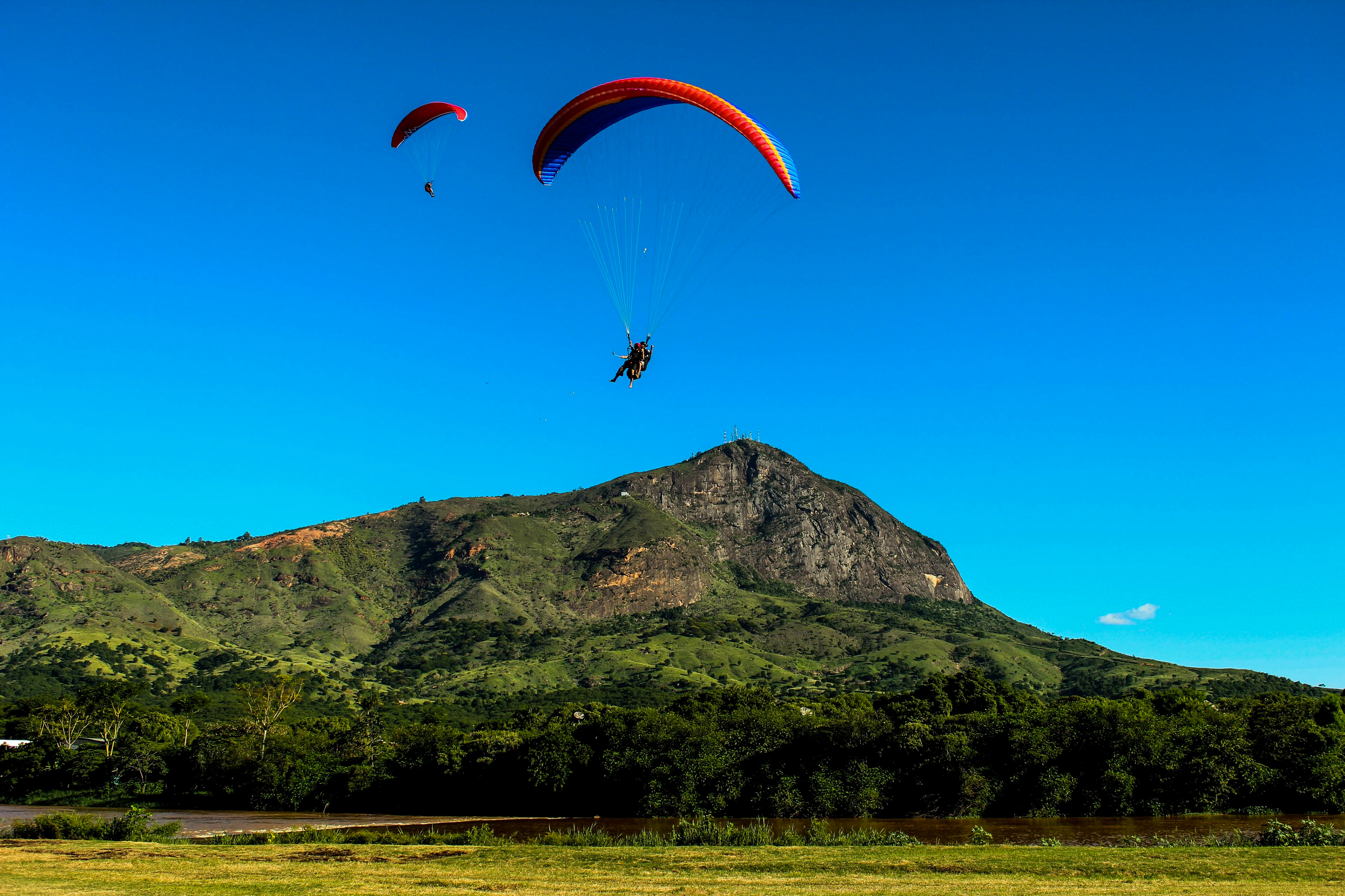
Governador Valadares, Brazil is known internationally for the World Paragliding Championships that has been held at Ibituruna Peak (1,123 m; 3,684 ft)

In 1954, Walter Newmark predicted (in an article in Flight magazine) a time when a glider pilot would be "able to launch himself by running over the edge of a cliff or down a slope ... whether on a rock-climbing holiday in Skye or skiing in the Alps."

In 1961, the French engineer Pierre Lemongine produced improved parachute designs that led to the Para-Commander (PC). The Para-Commander had cutouts at the rear and sides that enabled it to be towed into the air and steered, leading to parasailing/parascending.

In 1963, Canadian Domina Jalbert filed US Patent 3131894 for a multi-cell wing type aerial device —"a wing having a flexible canopy constituting an upper skin and with a plurality of longitudinally extending ribs forming in effect a wing corresponding to an airplane wing airfoil ... More particularly the invention contemplates the provision of a wing of rectangular or other shape having a canopy or top skin and a lower spaced apart bottom skin"— a governable gliding parachute with aerofoil shaped cells, an open leading edge, and a closed trailing edge inflated by passage through the air; a ram-air parafoil,

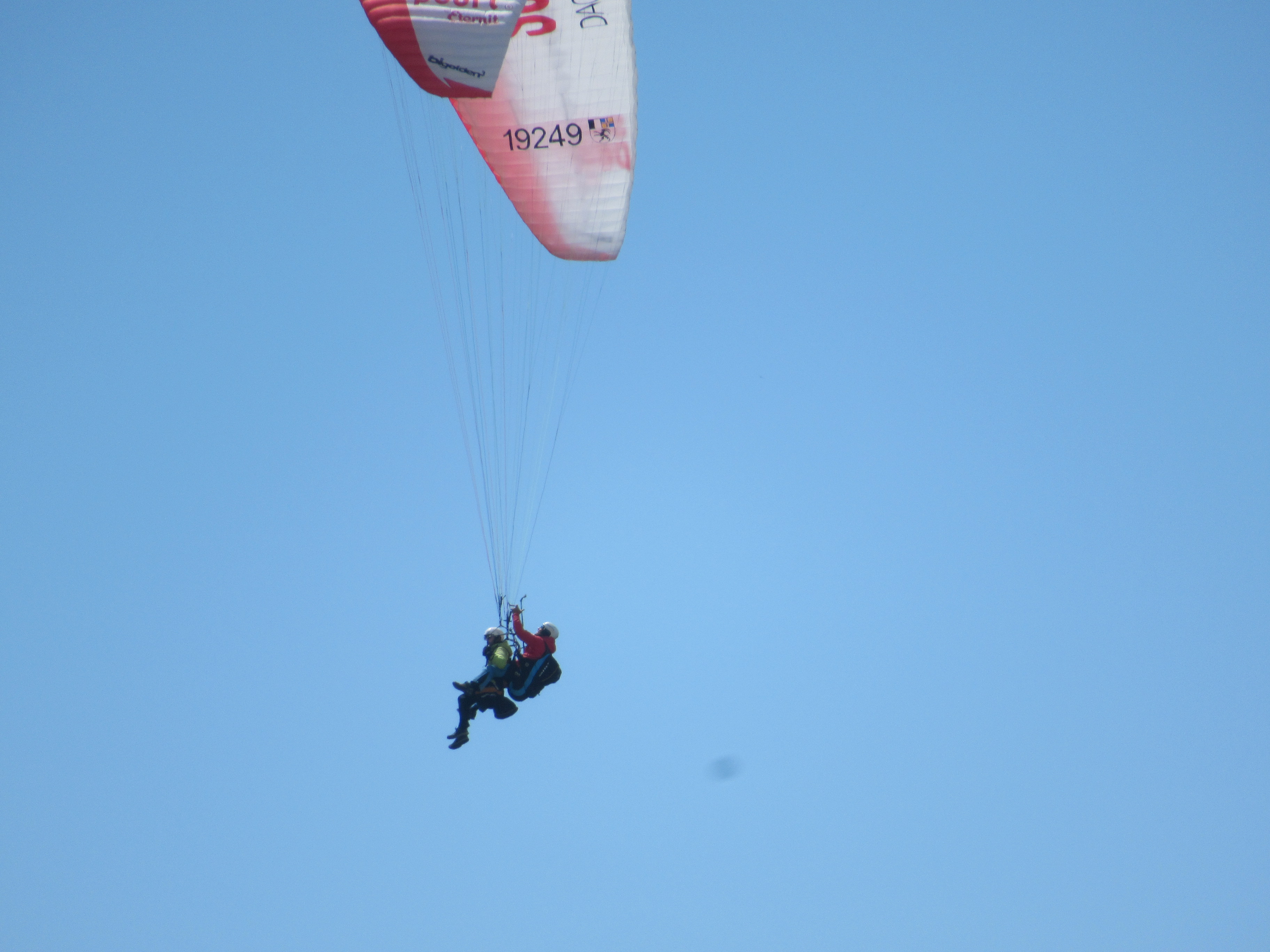
Paragliding with instructor at approximately 3,000 m (9,800 ft) over Lake Sils, St. Moritz (2018)

About that time, David Barish was developing the sail wing (single-surface wing) for recovery of NASA space capsules—"slope soaring was a way of testing out ... the Sail Wing." After tests on Hunter Mountain, New York, in September 1965, he went on to promote slope soaring as a summer activity for ski resorts.

Author Walter Neumark wrote Operating Procedures for Ascending Parachutes, and in 1973 he and a group of enthusiasts with a passion for tow-launching PCs and ram-air parachutes broke away from the British Parachute Association to form the British Association of Parascending Clubs (which later became the British Hang Gliding and Paragliding Association). In 1997, Neumark was awarded the Gold Medal of the Royal Aero Club of the UK. Authors Patrick Gilligan (Canada) and Bertrand Dubuis (Switzerland) wrote the first flight manual, The Paragliding Manual in 1985, coining the word paragliding.

These developments were combined in June 1978 by three friends, Jean-Claude Bétemps, André Bohn and Gérard Bosson, from Mieussy, Haute-Savoie, France. After inspiration from an article on slope soaring in the Parachute Manual magazine by parachutist and publisher Dan Poynter, they calculated that on a suitable slope, a "square" ram-air parachute could be inflated by running down the slope; Bétemps launched from Pointe du Pertuiset, Mieussy, and flew 100 m. Bohn followed him and glided down to the football pitch in the valley 1000 metres below. Parapente (pente being French for 'slope') was born.

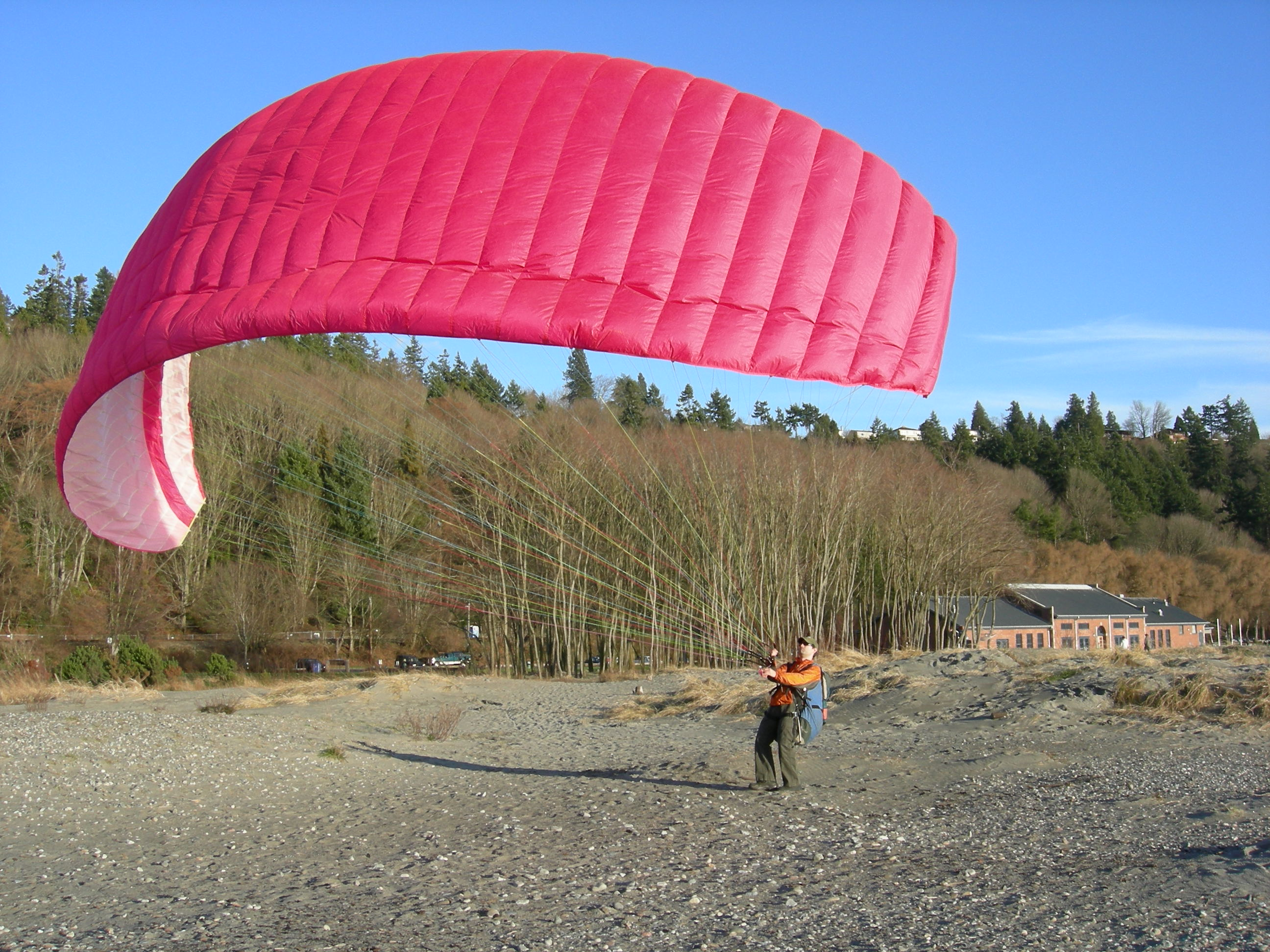
Land-based practice: Kiting

From the 1980s, equipment has continued to improve, and the number of paragliding pilots and established sites has continued to increase. The first (unofficial) Paragliding World Championship was held in Verbier, Switzerland, in 1987, though the first officially sanctioned FAI World Paragliding Championship was held in Kössen, Austria, in 1989.

Europe has seen the greatest growth in paragliding, with France alone registering in 2011 over 25,000 active pilots.

Starting in 2022, feasibility studies of paragliding from above 8000 meters have been in progress in the Everest region of Nepal— this would effectively be paragliding from the highest starting altitude on the planet.

== Equipment ==
=== Wing ===
Transverse cross section showing parts of a paraglider: 1. upper surface; 2. lower surface; 3. rib; 4. diagonal rib; 5. upper line cascade; 6. middle line cascade; 7. lower line cascade; 8. risers

The paraglider wing or canopy is usually what is known in engineering as a ram-air airfoil. Such wings comprise two layers of fabric that are connected to internal supporting material in such a way as to form a row of cells. By leaving most of the cells open only at the leading edge, incoming air keeps the wing inflated, thus maintaining its shape. When inflated, the wing's cross-section has the typical teardrop aerofoil shape. Modern paraglider wings are made of high-performance non-porous materials such as ripstop nylon. (Note: E.g. Gelvenor OLKS.)

In most modern paragliders (from the 1990s onwards), some of the cells of the leading edge are closed to form a cleaner aerodynamic profile. Holes in the internal ribs allow a free flow of air from the open cells to these closed cells to inflate them, and also to the wingtips, which are also closed. Almost all modern paragliders follow a sharknose design of the leading edge, by which the inflation opening is not at the front of the wing, but slightly backwards on the underside of the wing, and following a concave shape. This design, resembling the nose of a shark, increases wing stability and stall resistance. In modern paragliders, semi-flexible rods made out of plastic or nitinol are used to give extra stability to the profile of the wing. In high-performance paragliders, these rods extend through most of the length of the upper wing.

The pilot is supported underneath the wing by a network of suspension lines. These start with two sets of risers made of short (40 cm (16 in)) lengths of strong webbing. Each set is attached to the harness by a carabiner, one on each side of the pilot, and each riser of a set is generally attached to lines from only one row of its side of wing. At the end of each riser of the set, there is a small delta maillon with a number (2–5) of lines attached, forming a fan. These are typically 4–5 m (13–16 ft) long, with the end attached to 2–4 further lines of around 2 m (6.6 ft) m, which are again joined to a group of smaller, thinner lines. In some cases this is repeated for a fourth cascade.

3d CAD drawing of a paraglider showing the upper surface in green, the lower surface in blue and the leading edge openings in pink. Only the left half of the suspension cone is shown.

The top of each line is attached to small fabric loops sewn into the structure of the wing, which are generally arranged in rows running span-wise (i.e., side to side). The row of lines nearest the front are known as the A lines, the next row back the B lines, and so on. A typical wing will have A, B, C and D lines, but recently, there has been a tendency to reduce the rows of lines to three, or even two (and experimentally to one), to reduce drag.

Paraglider lines are usually made from UHMW polythene or aramid. Although they look rather slender, these materials are strong and subject to load testing requirements. For example, a single 0.66 mm-diameter line (about the thinnest used) can have a breaking strength of 56 kgf (550 N).

Paraglider wings typically have an area of 20–35 square metres (220–380 ft^{2}) with a span of 8–12 metres (26–39 ft) and weigh 3–7 kilograms (6.6–15.4 lb). Combined weight of wing, harness, reserve, instruments, helmet, etc. is around 12–22 kilograms (26–49 lb). Ultralight Hike & Fly kits can be lighter than 5 kilograms (11 lb).

The glide ratio of paragliders ranges from 9.3 for recreational wings to about 11.3 for modern competition models, reaching in some cases up to 13. For comparison, a typical skydiving parachute will achieve about 3:1 glide. A hang glider ranges from 9.5 for recreational wings to about 16.5 for modern competition models. An idling (gliding) Cessna 152 light aircraft will achieve 9:1. Some sailplanes can achieve a glide ratio of up to 72:1.

The speed range of paragliders is typically 22–55 kilometres per hour (14–34 mph), from stall speed to maximum speed. Achieving maximum speed requires the use of speedbar, or trimmers. Without these, and without applying brakes, a paraglider is at its trim speed, which is typically 32–40 kilometres per hour (20–25 mph) and often at the best glide ratio, too. High-performance paragliders meant for competitions may achieve faster accelerated flight, as do speedwings, due to their small size and different profile.

For storage and carrying, the wing is usually folded into a stuffsack (bag), which can then be stowed in a large backpack along with the harness. Some modern harnesses include the ability to turn the harness inside out such that it becomes a backpack, saving weight and space.

Paragliders are unique among human-carrying aircraft in being easily portable. The complete equipment packs into a rucksack and can be carried easily on the pilot's back, in a car, or on public transport. In comparison with other air sports, this substantially simplifies travel to a suitable takeoff spot, the selection of a landing place and return travel.

Tandem paragliders, designed to carry the pilot and one passenger, are larger but otherwise similar. They usually fly faster with higher trim speeds, are more resistant to collapse, and have a slightly higher sink rate compared to solo paragliders.

=== Harness ===
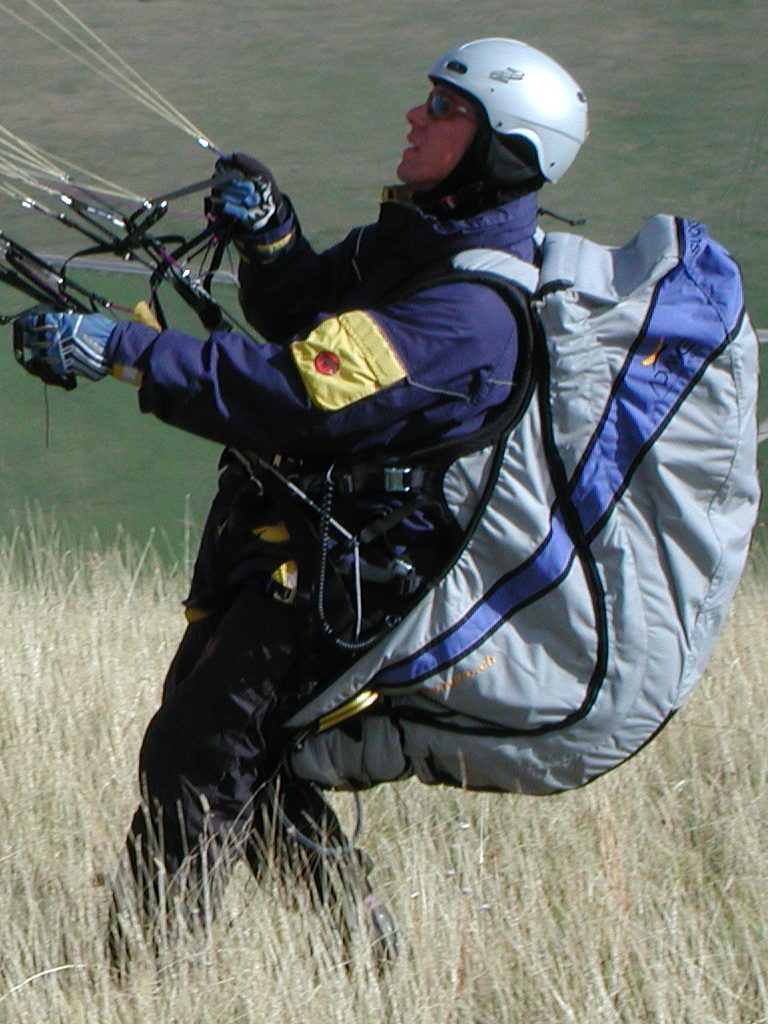
A pilot with harness (light blue), performing a reverse launch

The pilot is loosely and comfortably buckled into a harness, which offers support in both the standing and sitting positions. Most harnesses have protectors made out of foam or other materials underneath the seat and behind the back to reduce the impact on failed launches or landings. Modern harnesses are designed to be as comfortable as a lounge chair in the sitting or reclining position. Many harnesses even have an adjustable lumbar support. A reserve parachute is also typically connected to a paragliding harness.

Harnesses also vary according to the need of the pilot, and thereby come in a range of designs, mostly:

- open harnesses, ranging from training harness for beginners to all-round harnesses
- pod harnesses for long-distance cross-country flights
- competition harnesses, which are pod harnesses with the capacity to carry two reserve parachutes
- acro harnesses, a type of open harness, designed for acrobatic paragliding, with the capacity for two or three reserve parachutes
- hike&fly harnesses, which are designed to be lightweight and compact when folded away for hiking
- harnesses for tandem pilots and passengers
- kids tandem harnesses are also now available with special child-proof locks

Harnesses have a substantial influence on the flying characteristics; for instance, acro harnesses lead to more agile handling, which is desirable for flying acrobatics, but may be unsuitable for beginners or XC pilots looking for more stability in flight. While pod harnesses offer more stability and aerodynamic properties, they increase the risk of riser twist, and are hence not suitable for beginners. The standard harness is an open harness, which features a sitting, slightly reclined body position.

=== Instruments in paragliding ===
Most pilots use variometers, radios, and, increasingly, GNSS units when they are flying. Since 2003, some pilots are using smart glasses, allowing head up display technologies.

Variometer

The main purpose of a variometer is in helping a pilot find and stay in the "core" of a thermal to maximise height gain and, conversely, to indicate when a pilot is in sinking air and needs to find rising air. Humans can sense the acceleration when they first hit a thermal, but cannot detect the difference between constant rising air and constant sinking air. Modern variometers are capable of detecting rates of climb or sink of 1 cm per second. A variometer indicates climb rate (or sink-rate) with short audio signals (beeps, which increase in pitch and tempo during ascent, and a droning sound, which gets deeper as the rate of descent increases) and/or a visual display. It also shows altitude: either above takeoff, above sea level, or (at higher altitudes) flight level.

Radio

Radio communications are used in training, to communicate with other pilots, and to report where and when they intend to land. These radios normally operate on a range of frequencies in different countries—some authorised, some illegal but tolerated locally. Some local authorities (e.g., flight clubs) offer periodic automated weather updates on these frequencies. In rare cases, pilots use radios to talk to airport control towers or air traffic controllers. Many pilots carry a cell phone so they can call for pickup should they land away from their intended point of destination.

GNSS

GNSS is a necessary accessory when flying competitions, where it has to be demonstrated that way-points have been correctly passed. The recorded GNSS track of a flight can be used to analyze flying technique or can be shared with other pilots. GNSS is also used to determine drift due to the prevailing wind when flying at altitude, providing position information to allow restricted airspace to be avoided and identifying one's location for retrieval teams after landing out in unfamiliar territory. GNSS is integrated with some models of variometer. This is not only more convenient, but also allows for a three-dimensional record of the flight. The flight track can be used as proof for record claims, replacing the old method of photo documentation.

Increasingly, smart phones are used as the primary means of navigation and flight logging, with several applications available to assist in air navigation. They are also used to co-ordinate tasks in competitive paragliding and facilitate retrieval of pilots returning to their point of launch. External variometers are typically used to assist in accurate altitude information.

Head up display, have been introduced in 2023 with application that allow pilot wearing smart glasses, to display altitude, speed, and flight time in the field of view during the flight.

== Ground handling ==
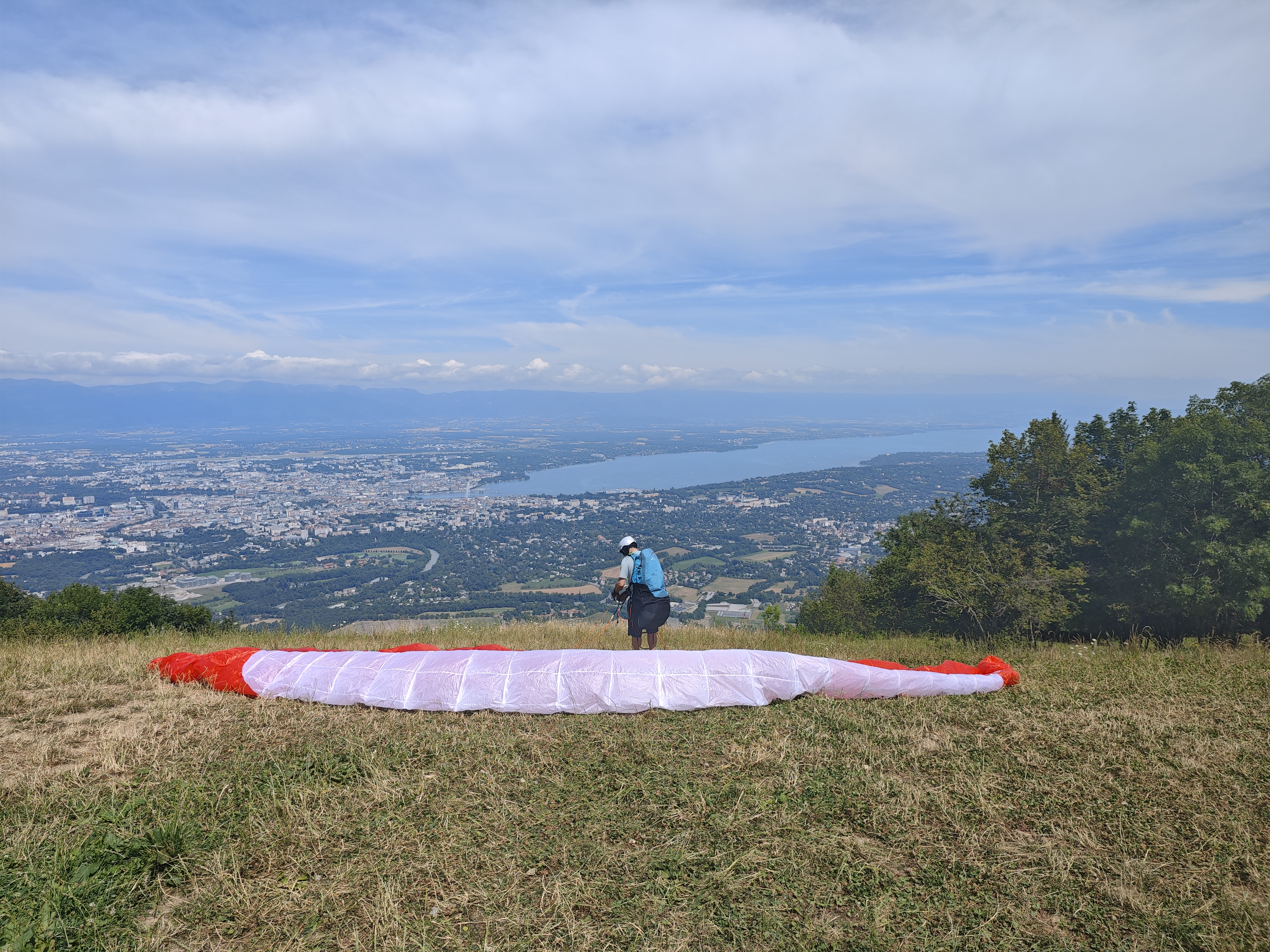
A paraglider gets ready to depart from Mont Saleve over Lake Geneva and Geneva

Paraglider ground handling is the practice of controlling the glider while staying on the ground. The primary purpose of ground handling is to practice the skills necessary for launching and landing. However, ground handling could be considered a fun and challenging sport in and of itself.

Ground handling is considered an essential part of most paragliding wing management training. It needs to be remembered that in any sort of stumble or tumble, the head is at risk and a helmet is therefore always advisable.

It is highly recommended that low hour pilots, ground-handling, should be wearing a formal harness with leg and waist straps firmly fitted and fastened. Since 2015 the standard harness has become an inflatable type. This forms a protective cushion when, during flight, air is forced through a check valve and retained in a chamber behind and under the pilot. In ground-handling practice the amount of air passing through the check valve may be very slight. In an accident where the pilot has been lifted and dumped while facing downwind, the protection offered by an inflatable harness is likely to be minimal. The old-fashioned foam type of harness has a special value in that sort of situation.

=== Location ===
The ideal launch training site for novices with standard wings has the following characteristics:

- Measured steady wind strength: 1 m/s to 4 m/s (3.6–14 km/h: 1.9–7.7 knots: 2.2–8.9 mph)
- The even, flat, surface should slope slightly downwards (2 or 3 degrees) from down-wind to up-wind (providing a small vertical lift component).
- The site must be isolated from uninvolved visitors.
- Free of obstructions that might create a trip or snag hazard.
- Soft surface, such as grass or sand, to reduce damage to the handler and wing in case of falls.
- Novices should wear a harness and helmet and be accompanied by an appropriate adult.

As pilots progress, they may challenge themselves by kiting over and around obstacles, in strong or turbulent wind, and on greater slopes.

== Flying ==
=== Launching ===
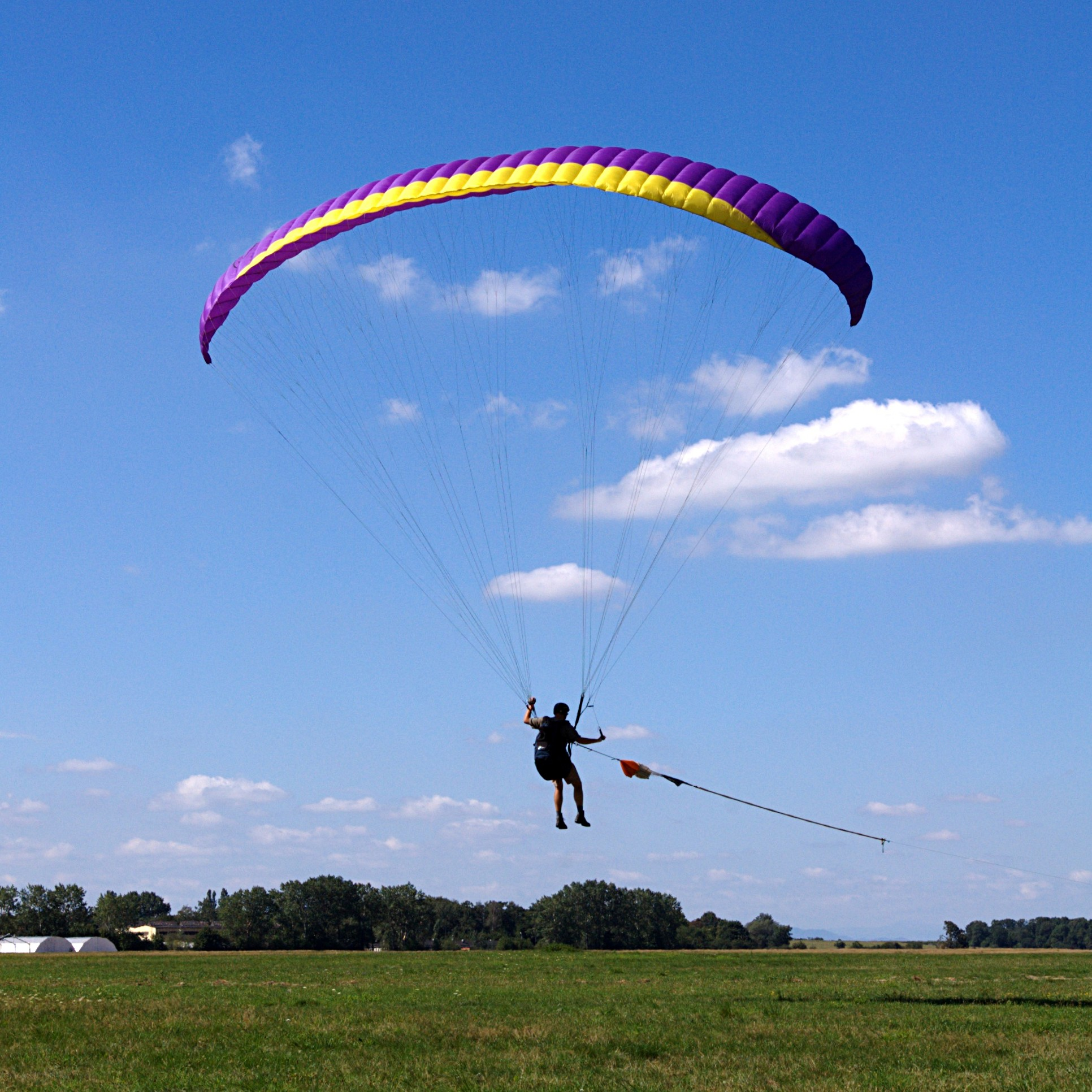
Paraglider towed launch, Mirosławice, Poland

As with all aircraft, launching and landing are done into wind. The wing is placed into an airstream, either by running or being pulled, or an existing wind. The wing moves up over the pilot into a position in which it can carry the passenger. The pilot is then lifted from the ground and, after a safety period, can sit down into their harness. Unlike skydivers, paragliders, like hang gliders, do not jump at any time during this process. There are two launching techniques used on higher ground and one assisted launch technique used in flatland areas:

==== Forward launch ====
In low winds, the wing is inflated with a forward launch, where the pilot runs forward with the wing behind so that the air pressure generated by the forward movement inflates the wing.

It is often easier, because the pilot only has to run forward, but the pilot cannot see their wing until it is above them, where they have to check it in a very short time for correct inflation and untangled lines before the launch.

==== Reverse launch ====
In higher winds, a reverse launch is used, with the pilot facing the wing to bring it up into a flying position, then turning around under the wing and running to complete the launch.

Reverse launches have a number of advantages over a forward launch. It is more straightforward to inspect the wing and check if the lines are free as it leaves the ground. In the presence of wind, the pilot can be tugged toward the wing, and facing the wing makes it easier to resist this force and safer in case the pilot slips (as opposed to being dragged backwards). However, the movement pattern is more complex than forward launch, and the pilot has to hold the brakes in a correct way and turn to the correct side so the lines are not tangled. These launches are normally attempted with a reasonable wind speed, making the ground speed required to pressurise the wing much lower.

Paraglider reverse launch, Mam Tor, England

The launch is initiated by the hands raising the leading edge with the As. As it rises the wing is controlled more by centring the feet than by use of the brakes or Cs. With mid level wings (EN C and D) the wing may try to "overshoot" the pilot as it nears the top. This is checked with Cs or brakes. The wing becomes increasingly sensitive to the Cs and brakes as its internal air pressure rises. This is usually felt from increasing lift of the wing applying harness pressure to the seat of the pants. That pressure indicates that the wing is likely to remain stable when the pilot pirouettes to face the wind.

The next step in the launch is to bring the wing into the lift zone. There are two techniques for accomplishing this depending on wind conditions. In light wind this is usually done after turning to the front, steering with the feet towards the low wing tip, and applying light brakes in a natural sense to keep the wing horizontal. In stronger wind conditions it is often found to be easier to remain facing downwind while moving slowly and steadily backwards into the wind.

Knees bent to load the wing, foot adjustments to remain central and minimum use of Cs or Brakes to keep the wing horizontal. Pirouette when the feet are close to lifting. This option has two distinct advantages. a) The pilot can see the wing centre marker (an aid to centring the feet) and, if necessary, b) the pilot can move briskly towards the wing to assist with an emergency deflation.

With either method it is essential to check "traffic" across the launch face before committing to flight.

The A's and C's technique described above is well suited to low-hours pilots, on standard wings, in wind strengths up to 10 knots. It is particularly recommended for kiting. As wind speed increases (above ten knots), especially on steep ridges, the use of the C's introduces the potential to be lifted before the wing is overhead due to the increased angle of attack. That type of premature lift often results in the pilot's weight swinging downwind rapidly, resulting in a frontal tuck (due to excess A line loads). In that situation the pilot commonly drops vertically and injuries are not uncommon. In ridge soaring situations above ten knots it is almost always better to lift the wing with A's only and use the brakes to stop any potential overshoot. The brakes do not usually increase the angle of attack as much C's. As wind strength increases it becomes more important than ever for the pilot to keep the wing loaded by bending the knees and pushing the shoulders forward. Most pilots will find that when their hands are vertically under the brake line pulleys they are able reduce trailing edge drag to the absolute minimum. That is not so easy for most, when the arms are thrust rearwards.

==== Towed launch ====
Paraglider launching in Araxá, Brazil

In flatter countryside, pilots can also be launched with a tow. Once at full height (towing can launch pilots up to 3,000 feet (910 m) altitude), the pilot pulls a release cord, and the towline falls away. This requires separate training, as flying on a winch has quite different characteristics from free flying. There are two major ways to tow: pay-in and pay-out towing. Pay-in towing involves a stationary winch that winds in the towline and thereby pulls the pilot in the air. The distance between winch and pilot at the start is around 500 metres (1,600 ft) or more. Pay-out towing involves a moving object, like a car or a boat, that pays out line slower than the speed of the object, thereby pulling the pilot up in the air. In both cases, it is very important to have a gauge indicating line tension to avoid pulling the pilot out of the air. Another form of towing is static line towing. This involves a moving object, like a car or a boat, attached to a paraglider or hang glider with a fixed-length line. This can be very dangerous, because now the forces on the line have to be controlled by the moving object itself, which is almost impossible to do, unless stretchy rope and a pressure/tension meter (dynamometer) is used. Static line towing with stretchy rope and a load cell as a tension meter has been used in Poland, Ukraine, Russia, and other Eastern European countries for over 20 years (under the name Malinka) with about the same safety record as other forms of towing.

A paragliding flight over the Mussel Rock Gliding Bluffs in Pacifica, California

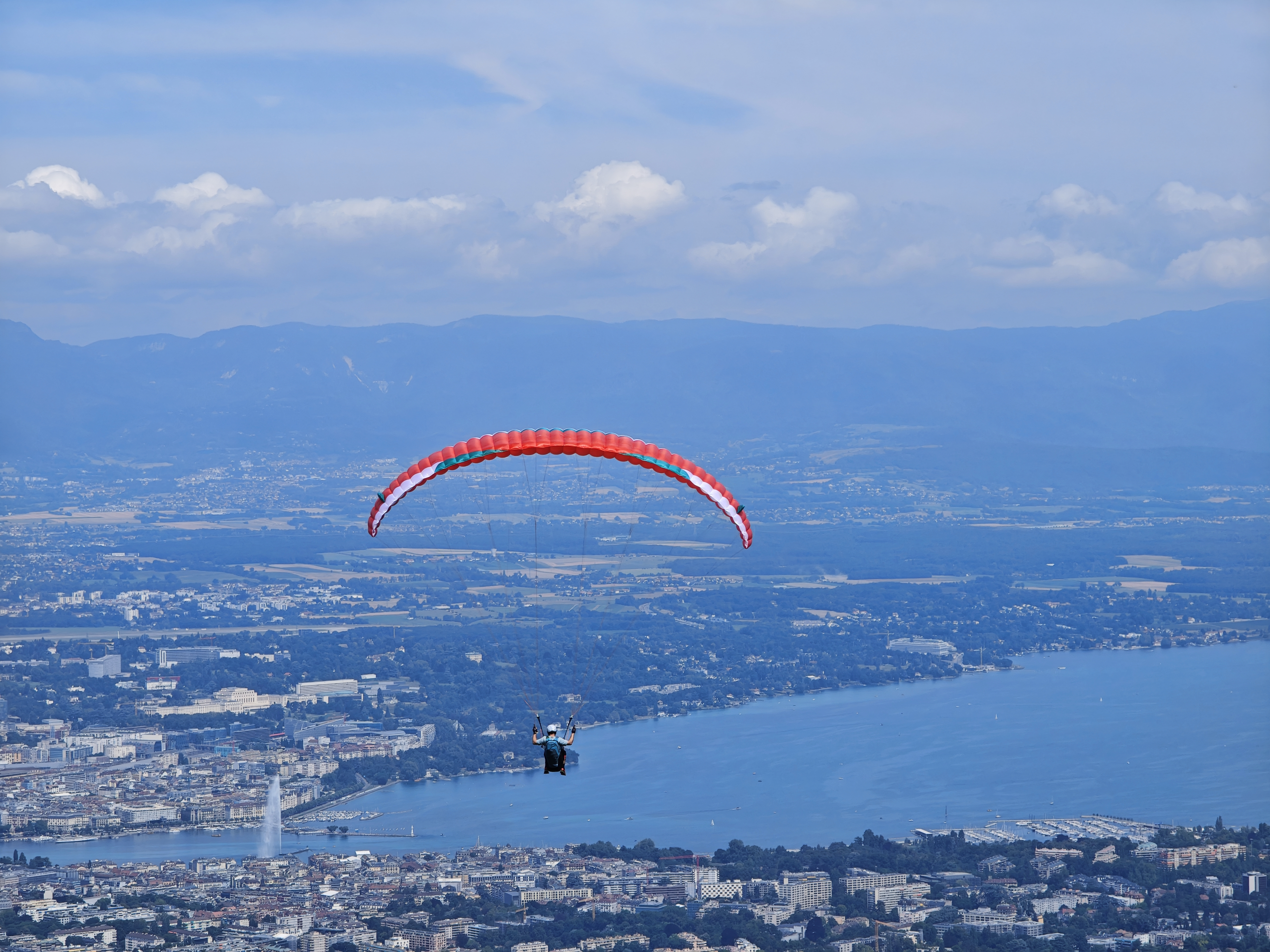
A paraglider flies above Lac Leman and Geneva with the Jet d'Eau seen

One more form of towing is hand towing. This is where 1–3 people pull a paraglider using a tow rope of up to 500 feet (150 m). The stronger the wind, the fewer people are needed for a successful hand tow. Tows up to 300 feet (91 m) have been accomplished, allowing the pilot to get into a lift band of a nearby ridge or row of buildings and ridge-soar in the lift the same way as with a regular foot launch.

=== Landing ===
Landing a paraglider, as with all unpowered aircraft which cannot abort a landing, involves some specific techniques and traffic patterns. Paragliding pilots most commonly lose their height by flying a figure 8 over a landing zone until they reach the correct height, then line up into the wind and give the glider full speed. Once the correct height (about a metre above ground) is achieved the pilot will stall the glider in order to land.

Landing figure 8 pattern

==== Traffic pattern ====
Unlike during launch, where coordination between multiple pilots is straightforward, landing involves more planning, because more than one pilot might have to land at the same time. Therefore, a specific traffic pattern has been established. Pilots line up into a position above the airfield and to the side of the landing area, which is dependent on the wind direction, where they can lose height (if necessary) by flying circles. From this position, they follow the legs of a flightpath in a rectangular pattern to the landing zone: downwind leg, base leg, and final approach. This allows for synchronization between multiple pilots and reduces the risk of collisions, because a pilot can anticipate what nearby pilots are going to do next.

==== Techniques ====
Paragliding landing pattern

Landing involves lining up for an approach into wind and, just before touching down, flaring the wing to minimise vertical and/or horizontal speed. This consists of gently going from 0% brake at around two metres to 100% brake when touching down on the ground.

In light winds, a controlled stall is used for a gentle touchdown; in stronger winds, only gentle brake input is needed for a good landing.

Pilots are generally advised to land into wind when possible. If a hard landing is unavoidable, a parachute landing fall can spread the impact over a larger area of the body and reduced the risk of injury.

=== Control ===
Speedbar mechanism

Brakes: controls held in each of the pilot's hands connect to the trailing edge of the left and right sides of the wing. These controls are called brakes and provide the primary and most general means of control in a paraglider. The brakes are used to adjust speed, to steer (in addition to weight shift), and to flare (during landing).

Weight shift: in addition to manipulating the brakes, a paraglider pilot must also lean in order to steer properly. Such weight shifting can also be used for more limited steering when brake use is unavailable, such as when under "big ears" (see below). More advanced control techniques may also involve weight shifting.

Speed bar: a kind of foot control called the speed bar (also accelerator) attaches to the paragliding harness and connects to the leading edge of the paraglider wing, usually through a system of at least two pulleys (see animation in margin). This control is used to increase speed and does so by decreasing the wing's angle of attack. This control is necessary because the brakes can only slow the wing from what is called trim speed (no brakes applied). The accelerator is needed to go faster than this.

More advanced means of control can be obtained by manipulating the paraglider's risers or lines directly. Most commonly, the lines connecting to the outermost points of the wing's leading edge can be used to induce the wingtips to fold under. The technique, known as "big ears", is used to increase the rate of descent (see picture and the full description below). The risers connecting to the rear of the wing can also be manipulated for steering if the brakes have been severed or are otherwise unavailable. For ground-handling purposes, a direct manipulation of these lines can be more effective and offer more control than the brakes. The effect of sudden wind blasts can be countered by directly pulling on the risers and making the wing unflyable, thereby avoiding falls or unintentional takeoffs.

==== Fast descents ====
Problems with getting down can occur when the lift situation is very good or when the weather changes unexpectedly. There are three possibilities for rapidly reducing altitude in such situations, each of which has benefits and issues to be aware of. The "big ears" manoeuvre induces descent rates of 2.5 to 3.5 m/s, 4–6 m/s with additional speed bar. It is the most controllable of the techniques and the easiest for beginners to learn. The B-line stall induces descent rates of 6–10 m/s. It increases loading on parts of the wing (the pilot's weight is mostly on the B-lines, instead of spread across all the lines). Finally, a spiral dive offers the fastest rate of descent, at 7–25 m/s. It places greater loads on the wing than other techniques do and requires the highest level of skill from the pilot to execute safely.

Big ears

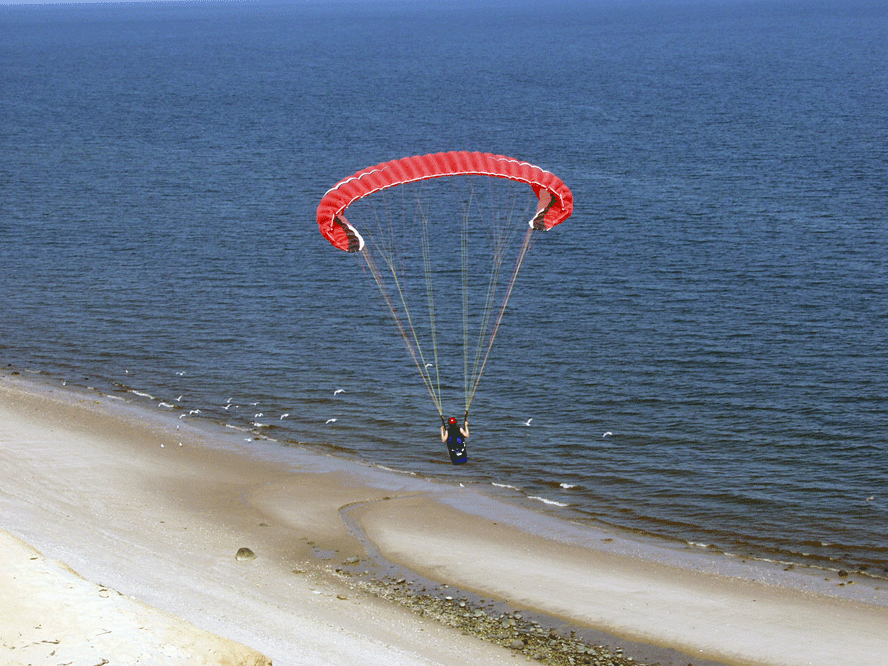
Paraglider in "Big Ears" manoeuvre

Pulling on the outer A-lines during non-accelerated, normal flight folds the wing tips inwards, which substantially reduces the glide angle with only a small decrease in forward speed. As the effective wing area is reduced, the wing loading is increased, and it becomes more stable. However, the angle of attack is increased, and the craft is closer to stall speed, but this can be ameliorated by applying the speed bar, which also increases the descent rate. When the lines are released, the wing re-inflates. If necessary, a short pumping on the brakes helps reestablish normal flight. Compared to the other techniques, with big ears, the wing still glides forward, which enables the pilot to leave an area of danger. Even landing this way is possible, e.g., if the pilot has to counter an updraft on a slope.

B-line stall
In a B-line stall, the second set of risers from the leading-edge/front (the B-lines) are pulled down independently of the other risers, with the specific lines used to initiate a stall. This puts a spanwise crease in the wing, thereby separating the airflow from the upper surface of the wing. It dramatically reduces the lift produced by the canopy and thus induces a higher rate of descent. This can be a strenuous manoeuvre, because these B-lines have to be held in this position, and the tension of the wing puts an upwards force on these lines. The release of these lines has to be handled carefully not to provoke a too fast forward shooting of the wing, which the pilot then could fall into. This is less popular now as it induces high loads on the internal structure of the wing.

Spiral dive
The spiral dive is the most rapid form of controlled fast descent; an aggressive spiral dive can achieve a sink rate of 25 m/s. This manoeuvre halts forward progress and brings the flier almost straight down. The pilot pulls the brakes on one side and shifts his weight onto that side to induce a sharp turn. The flight path then begins to resemble a corkscrew. After a specific downward speed is reached, the wing points directly to the ground. When the pilot reaches their desired height, they end this manoeuvre by slowly releasing the inner brake, shifting their weight to the outer side and braking on this side. The release of the inner brake has to be handled carefully to end the spiral dive gently in a few turns. If done too fast, the wing translates the turning into a dangerous upward and pendular motion.
Spiral dives put a strong G-force on the wing and glider and must be done carefully and skilfully. The G-forces involved can induce blackouts, and the rotation can produce disorientation. Some high-end gliders have what is called a "stable spiral problem". After inducing a spiral and without further pilot input, some wings do not automatically return to normal flight and stay inside their spiral. Serious injury and fatal accidents have occurred when pilots could not exit this manoeuvre and spiralled into the ground.

The rate of rotation in a spiral dive can be reduced by using a drogue chute, deployed just before the spiral is induced. This reduces the G forces experienced.

=== Ridge soaring ===
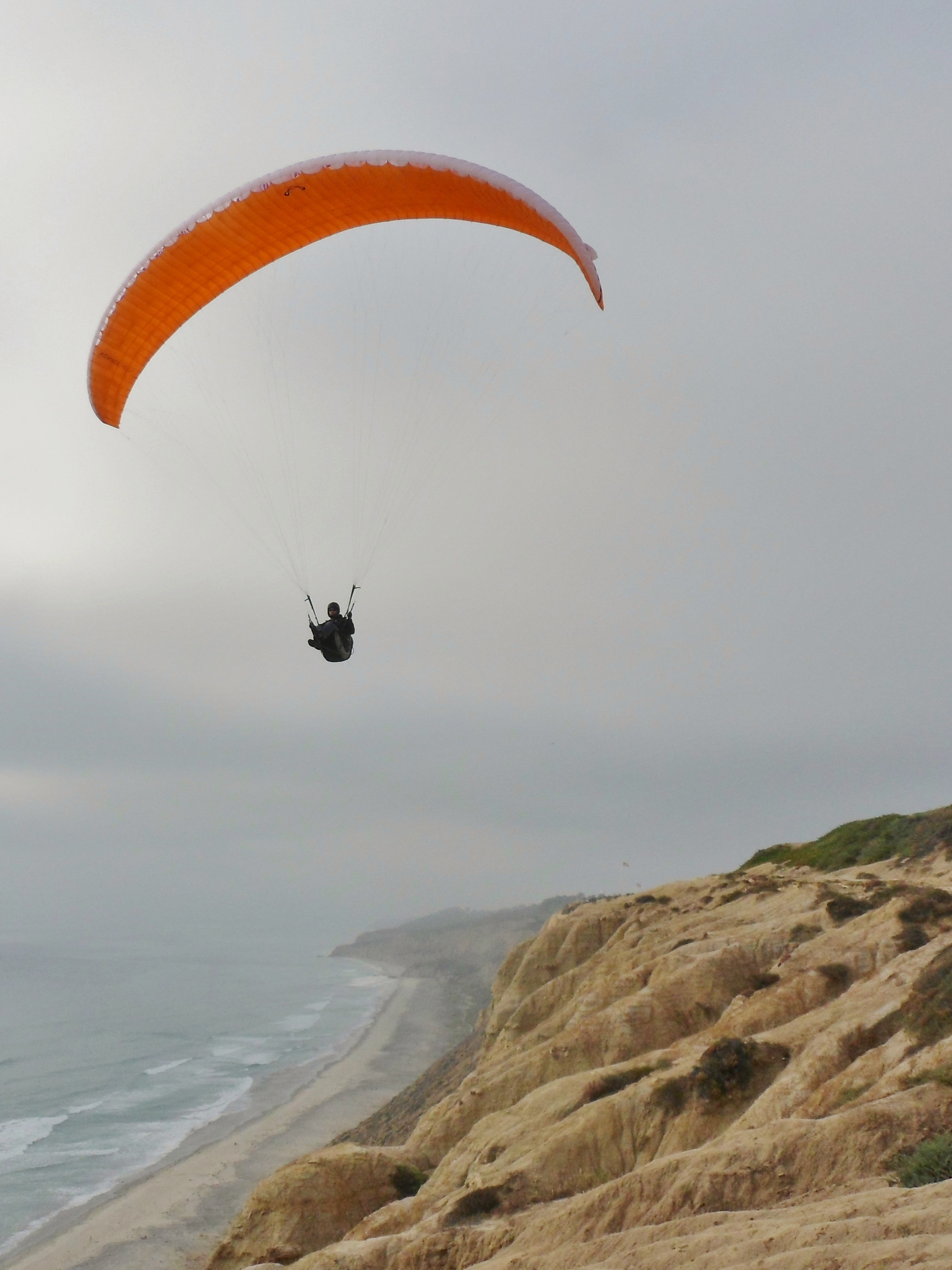
Ridge soaring along the California coast

Ridge soaring is a technique that allows lift to be obtained by using the wind directed upwards by a fixed object such as a dune or ridge. To achieve this, pilots fly along the length of a slope feature in the landscape, relying on the lift provided by the air, which is forced up as it passes over the slope. This type of lift is highly dependent on a steady wind within a defined range (the suitable range depends on the performance of the wing and the skill of the pilot). Too little wind, and insufficient lift is available to stay airborne (pilots end up 'scratching' along the slope). With more wind, gliders can fly well above and forward of the slope, but too much wind, and there is a risk of being blown back over the slope. A particular form of ridge soaring is called condo soaring, where pilots soar a row of buildings that form an artificial ridge. This form of soaring is particularly used in flat lands where there are no natural ridges, but there are plenty of man-made building ridges.

=== Thermal flying ===
Paragliders in the air at Torrey Pines Gliderport

When the sun warms the ground, the ground will radiate some of its heat to a thin layer of air situated just above it. Air has very poor thermal conductivity and most of the heat transfer in it will be convective – forming rising columns of hot air, called thermals. If the terrain is not uniform, it will warm some features more than others (such as rock faces or large buildings) and these thermals will tend to always form at the same spot, otherwise they will be more random. Sometimes these may be a simple rising column of air; more often, they are blown sideways in the wind and will break off from the source, with a new thermal forming later.

Once a pilot finds a thermal, they begin to fly in a circle, trying to centre the circle on the strongest part of the thermal (the "core"), where the air is rising the fastest. Most pilots use a vario-altimeter ("vario"), which indicates climb rate with beeps and/or a visual display, to help core in on a thermal.

Often there is strong sink surrounding thermals, and there is also strong turbulence resulting in wing collapses as a pilot tries to enter a strong thermal. Good thermal flying is a skill that takes time to learn, but a good pilot can often core a thermal all the way to cloud base.

=== Cross-country flying ===
Once the skills of using thermals to gain altitude have been mastered, pilots can glide from one thermal to the next to go cross country. Having gained altitude in a thermal, a pilot glides down to the next available thermal.

Potential thermals can be identified by land features that typically generate thermals or by cumulus clouds, which mark the top of a rising column of warm, humid air as it reaches the dew point and condenses to form a cloud.

Cross-country pilots also need an intimate familiarity with air law, flying regulations, aviation maps indicating restricted airspace, etc.

=== In-flight wing deflation (collapse) ===
Since the shape of the wing (airfoil) is formed by the moving air entering and inflating the wing, in turbulent air, part or all of the wing can deflate (collapse). Piloting techniques referred to as active flying will greatly reduce the frequency and severity of deflations or collapses. On modern recreational wings, such deflations will normally recover without pilot intervention. In the event of a severe deflation, correct pilot input will speed recovery from a deflation, but incorrect pilot input may slow the return of the glider to normal flight, so pilot training and practice in correct response to deflations are necessary.

For the rare occasions when it is not possible to recover from a deflation (or from other threatening situations such as a spin), most pilots carry a reserve (rescue, emergency) parachute (or even two); however, most pilots never have cause to "throw" their reserve. Should a wing deflation occur at low altitude, i.e., shortly after takeoff or just before landing, the wing (paraglider) may not recover its correct structure rapidly enough to prevent an accident, with the pilot often not having enough altitude remaining to deploy a reserve parachute (with the minimum altitude for this being approximately 60 m (200 ft), but typical deployment to stabilization periods using up 120–180 m (390–590 ft) of altitude) successfully. Different packing methods of the reserve parachute affect its deploying time.

Low-altitude wing failure can result in serious injury or death due to the subsequent velocity of a ground impact whereas a higher altitude failure may allow more time to regain some degree of control in the descent rate and, critically, deploy the reserve if needed. In-flight wing deflation and other hazards are minimized by flying a suitable glider and choosing appropriate weather conditions and locations for the pilot's skill and experience level.

== As a competitive sport ==
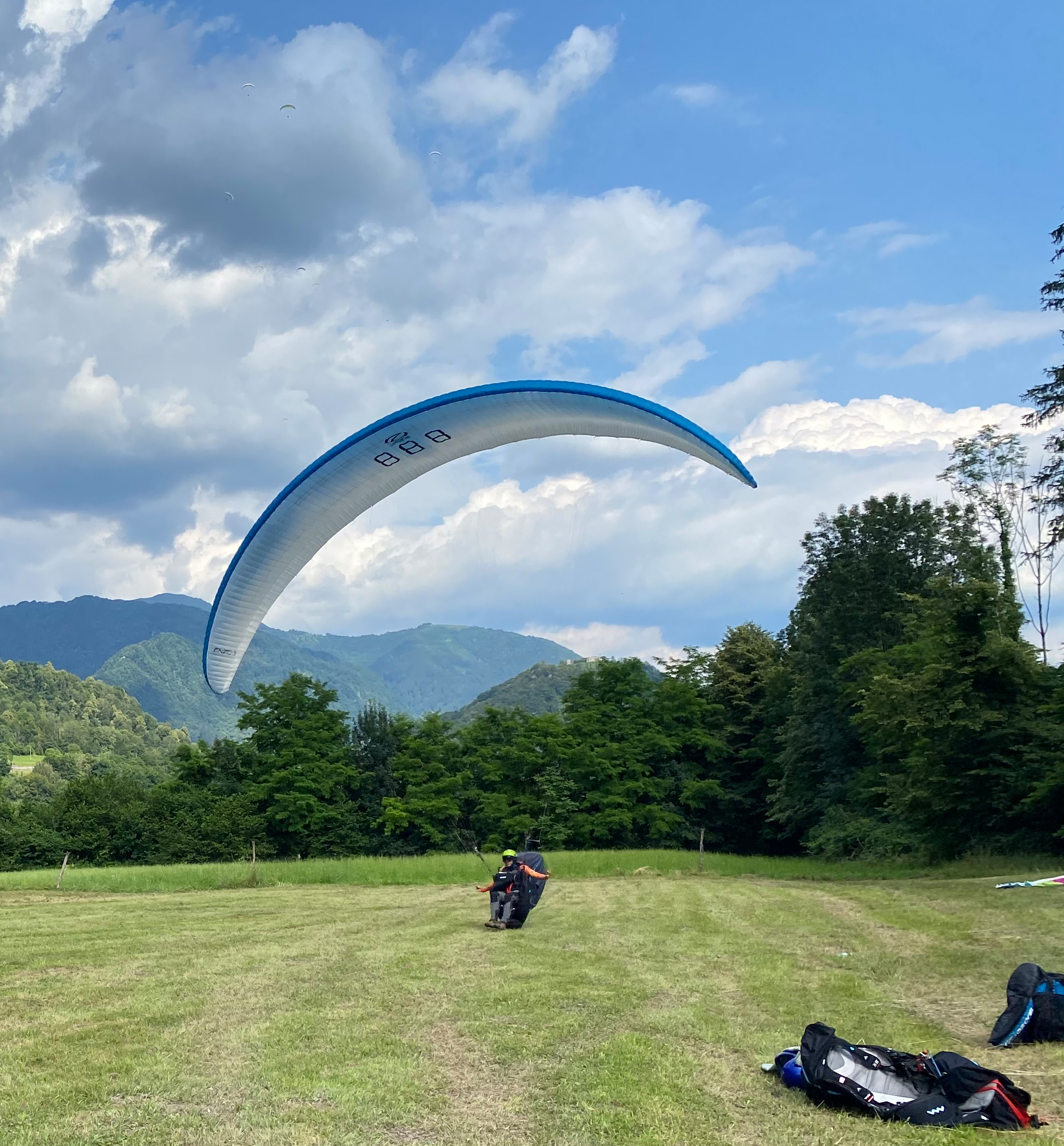
An Ozone Enzo 3, a wing commonly seen at competitions

There are various disciplines of competitive paragliding:

- Cross-country flying is the classical form of paragliding competitions with championships in club, regional, national and international levels. The two top level competitions are:
  - World Paragliding Championships
  - Paragliding World Cup
- Aerobatic competitions demand the participants to perform certain manoeuvres. Competitions are held for individual pilots as well as for pairs that show synchronous performances. This form is the most spectacular for spectators on the ground to watch.
- Hike & Fly competitions, in which a certain route has to be flown or hiked only over several days: Red Bull X-Alps—the unofficial world championship in this category of competition—first launched in 2003 and has since taken place every other year. Since 2012, the similar X-Pyr cross-Pyrenees competition has taken place in the even years. Many other Hike and Fly competitions occur worldwide.

In addition to these organized events it is also possible to participate in various online contests that require participants to upload flight track data to dedicated websites like OLC.

== Safety ==
Paraglider launch video in Araxá, Brazil

Paragliding, like any adventure sport, is a potentially dangerous activity. In the United States, for example, in 2010 (the last year for which details are available), one paraglider pilot died. This is an equivalent rate of one in 5,000 pilots. In 2019, YouTuber Grant Thompson of The King Of Random died in a paraglider accident. Over the years 1994–2010, an average of seven in every 10,000 active paraglider pilots have been fatally injured, though with a marked improvement in recent years. In France (with over 25,000 registered fliers), two of every 10,000 pilots were fatally injured in 2011 (a rate that is not atypical of the years 2007–2011), although around six of every 1,000 pilots were seriously injured (more than two-day hospital stay).

The potential for injury can be significantly reduced by training and risk management. The use of proper equipment such as a wing designed for the pilot's size and skill level, as well as a helmet, a reserve parachute, and a cushioned harness also minimize risk. Pilot safety is influenced by an understanding of the site conditions such as air turbulence (rotors), strong thermals, gusty wind, and ground obstacles such as power lines. Sufficient pilot training in wing control and emergency manoeuvres from competent instructors can minimize accidents. Many paragliding accidents are the result of a combination of pilot error and poor flying conditions.

SIV, short for Simulation d'Incident en Vol (simulation of incident in flight) instruction offers training in managing and preventing unstable and potentially dangerous situations such as collapses, full stalls, and cravattes. These courses are typically led by a specially trained instructor over large bodies of water, with the student usually being instructed via radio. Students will be taught how to induce dangerous situations, and thus learn how to both avoid and remedy them once induced. This course is recommended to pilots who are looking to move to more high performance and less stable wings, which is a natural progression for most pilots. In some countries a SIV course is a basic requirement of initial pilot training. In the event of an unrecoverable manoeuvre resulting in water landing, a rescue boat is typically dispatched to collect the pilot. Other added safety features may include buoyancy aids or secondary reserve parachutes. These courses are not considered essential for novice level flying.

Before scheduling a paragliding adventure, verify weather conditions to ensure flight safety. Check the pilot's qualifications, ensuring they hold a P4 or P5 certification, which includes extensive experience and training in emergency procedures. Engage with the pilot beforehand to assess their experience and ensure they are well-rested, as fatigue becomes a risk factor after multiple flights. Inspect the paragliding equipment for wear and tear, focusing on components like the canopy, brake lines, and reserve parachute, which should be regularly maintained. Finally, confirm the operator's licenses and permissions, and practice ground handling skills under guidance before takeoff to enhance safety and control.

To ensure safer flying, paragliding authorities issue graded certifications to pilots based on their skill levels. The two most widely recognized systems are APPI and IPPI.

APPI is an international non-profit organisation active in about 100 countries sharing knowledge and poi’s for paraglider.

IPPI is an international pilot license you have to carry with your national one when you want to fly outside your country, with the level on the IPPI card showing what you are allowed to do in other countries.

== Instruction ==
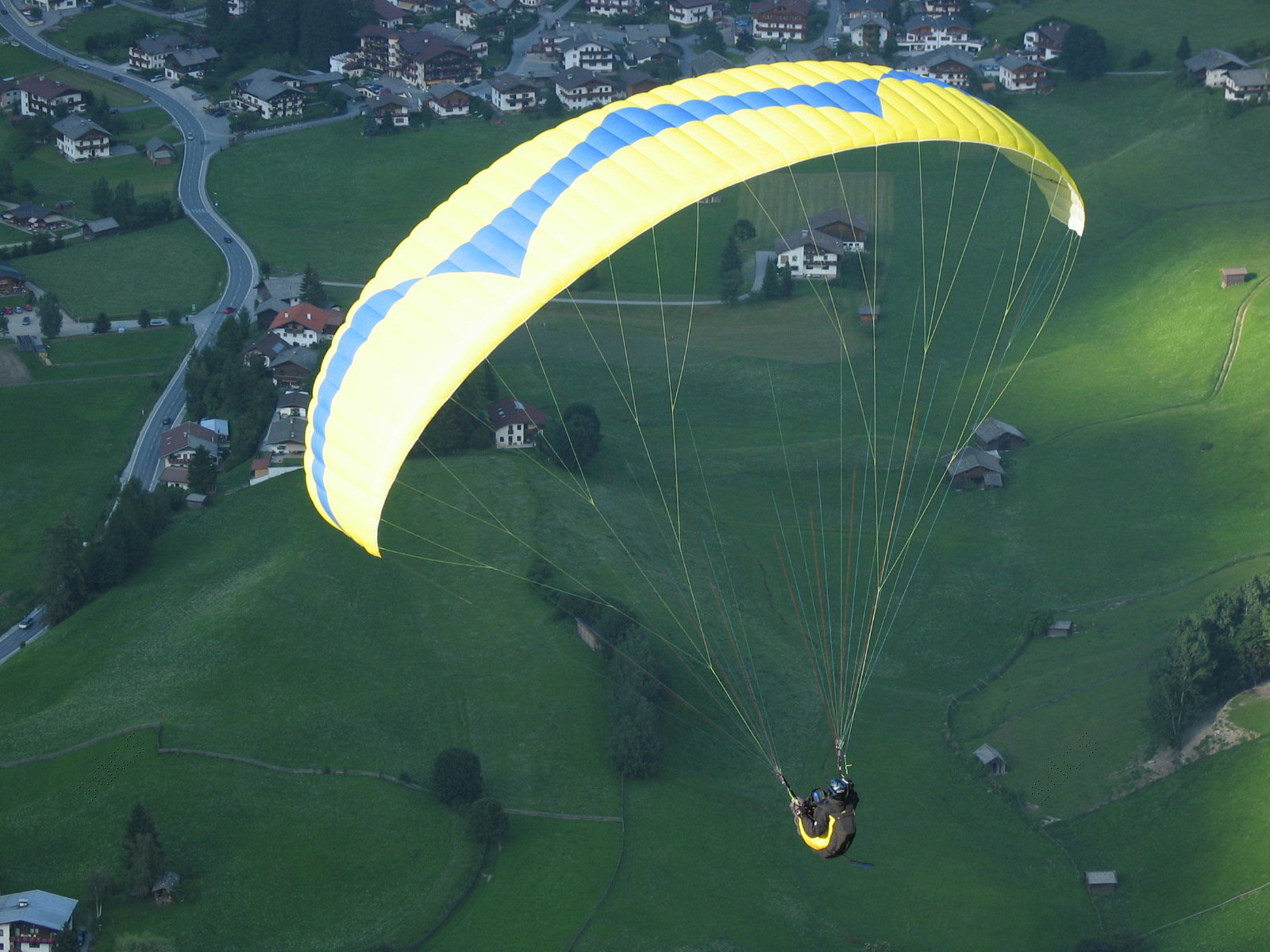
Flying above Stubaital, Austria

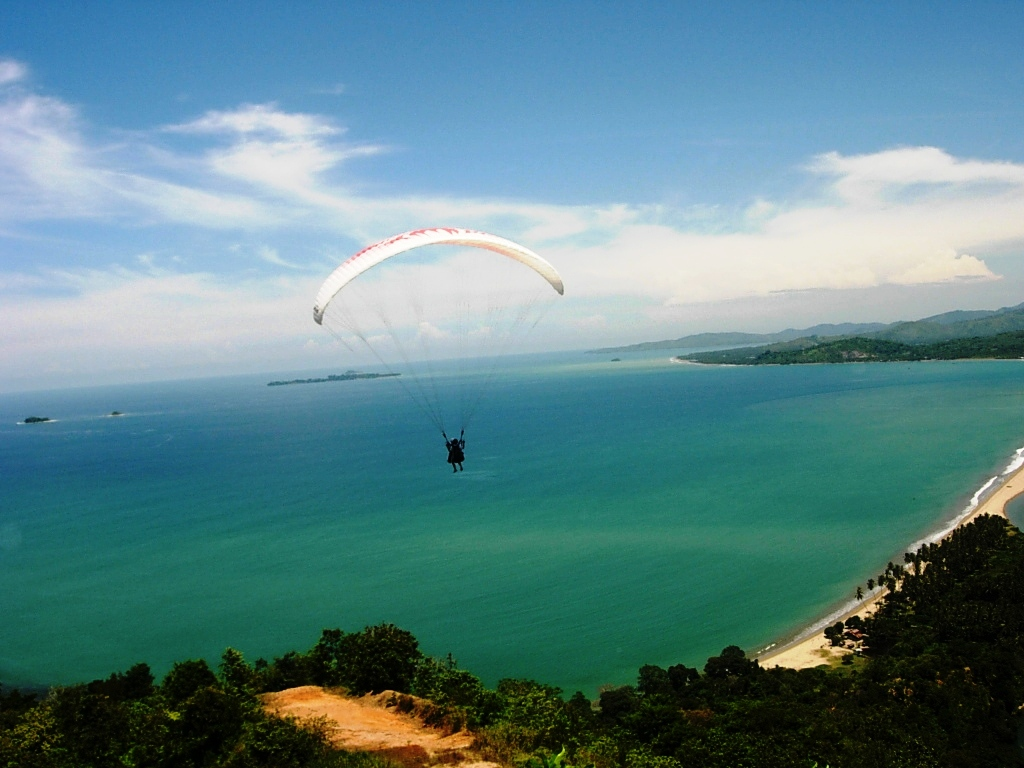
Tandem Paragliding at Painan, Indonesia

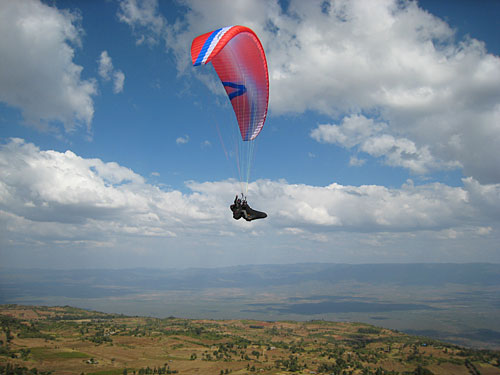
Tandem Paragliding in Elgeyo Escarpment

Most popular paragliding regions have a number of schools, generally registered with and/or organized by national associations. Certification systems vary widely between countries, though around 10 days instruction to basic certification is standard.

There are several key components to a paragliding pilot certification instruction program. Initial training for beginning pilots usually begins with some amount of ground school to discuss the basics, including elementary theories of flight as well as basic structure and operation of the paraglider.

Students then learn how to control the glider on the ground, practising take-offs and controlling the wing 'overhead'. Low, gentle hills are next where students get their first short flights, flying at very low altitudes, to get used to the handling of the wing over varied terrain. Special winches can be used to tow the glider to low altitude in areas that have no hills readily available.

As their skills progress, students move on to steeper/higher hills (or higher winch tows), making longer flights, and learning to turn the glider, control the glider's speed, then moving on to 360° turns, spot landings, 'big ears' (used to increase the rate of descent for the paraglider), and other more advanced techniques. Training instructions are often provided to the student via radio, particularly during the first flights.

A third key component to a complete paragliding instructional program provides substantial background in the key areas of meteorology, aviation law, and general flight area etiquette.

To give prospective pilots a chance to determine if they would like to proceed with a full pilot training program, most schools offer tandem flights, in which an experienced instructor pilots the paraglider with the prospective pilot as a passenger. Schools often offer pilot's families and friends the opportunity to fly tandem, and sometimes sell tandem pleasure flights at holiday resorts.

Most recognised courses lead to a national licence and an internationally recognised International Pilot Proficiency Information/Identification card. The IPPI specifies five stages of paragliding proficiency, from the entry level ParaPro 1 to the most advanced stage 5. Attaining a level of ParaPro 3 typically allows the pilot to fly solo or without instructor supervision.

== World records ==
FAI (Fédération Aéronautique Internationale) world records:

- Free Distance (previously titled "Straight Distance" prior to May 2020) – 609.9 km (379.0 mi): Sebastien Kayrouz (USA), Del Rio, Texas (USA) – Claude, Texas (USA) – 20 June 2021 flying an Ozone Enzo 3
- Straight distance (female) – 531.7 km (330.4 mi): Yael Margelisch (Switzerland); Caicó (Brazil) – 12 October 2019 flying an Ozone Enzo 3
- Straight distance to declared goal – 556.8 km (346.0 mi): Sebastien Kayrouz (USA), Del Rio, Texas (USA) – Claude, Texas (USA) – 20 June 2021 flying an Ozone Enzo 3
- Straight distance to a declared goal (female) – 457,3 km (284,15 mi): Marcella Pomarico Uchoa (BRA) – 14 Oct 2022 flying an Ozone Enzo 3 (location Caicó (Brazil))
- Gain of height – 5,854 m (19,206 ft): Antoine Girard (France); Aconcagua (Argentina); 15 February 2019, flying an Ozone LM6

Others:

- Highest flight – 9,947 m (32,635 ft) : Ewa Wisnierska; between Barraba and Niagra (Australia).

== Related activities ==
=== Sky diving ===
Parachutes have the most resemblance with paragliders but the sports are very different. Whereas with sky diving the parachute is a tool to safely return to earth after free fall, the paraglider allows longer flights and the use of thermals.

=== Hang gliding ===
Hang gliding is a close cousin, and hang glider and paraglider launches are often found in proximity to one another. Despite the considerable difference in equipment, the two activities offer similar pleasures, and some pilots are involved in both sports.

=== Powered hang glider ===
Foot-launched powered hang gliders are powered by an engine and propeller in pusher configuration. An ordinary hang glider is used for its wing and control frame, and the pilot can foot-launch from a hill or from flat ground.

=== Powered paragliding ===
Powered paragliding is the flying of paragliders with a small engine known as a paramotor attached. Powered paragliding is known as paramotoring and requires extra training alongside regular paragliding training. It is often recommended to become competent in paragliding prior to learning to paramotor in order to know fully what one is doing.

=== Speed flying ===
Speed flying, or speed riding, is the separate sport of flying paragliders of a reduced size. These wings have increased speed, though they are not normally capable of soaring flight. The sport involves taking off on skis or on foot and swooping rapidly down in close proximity to a slope, even periodically touching it if skis are used. These smaller wings are also sometimes used where wind speeds are too high for a full-sized paraglider, although this is invariably at coastal sites where the wind is laminar and not subject to as much mechanical turbulence as inland sites.

=== Parakites ===
Parakites are a combination of a paraglider and kite wing. They allow for the pilot to adjust the wings angle of attack (AOA) by use of toggles which are connected though a pulley system that then connect to the trailing edge/brakes as well as other parts of the wing. In this way the pilot can rapidly alter the angle at which the wing is flying. This added control allows for direct pitch control, where normal paragliders are more limited in this regard. There are many parakite designs but many feature added stability also known as a reflex profile which makes the wing easier to ground handle as well. Due to parakites increased stability they are often able to be flown in much higher wind condition allowing for some truly incredible coastal ridge soaring. This added stability can also make parakites more challenging as they are often very stable all the way to their stall point.

=== Gliding ===
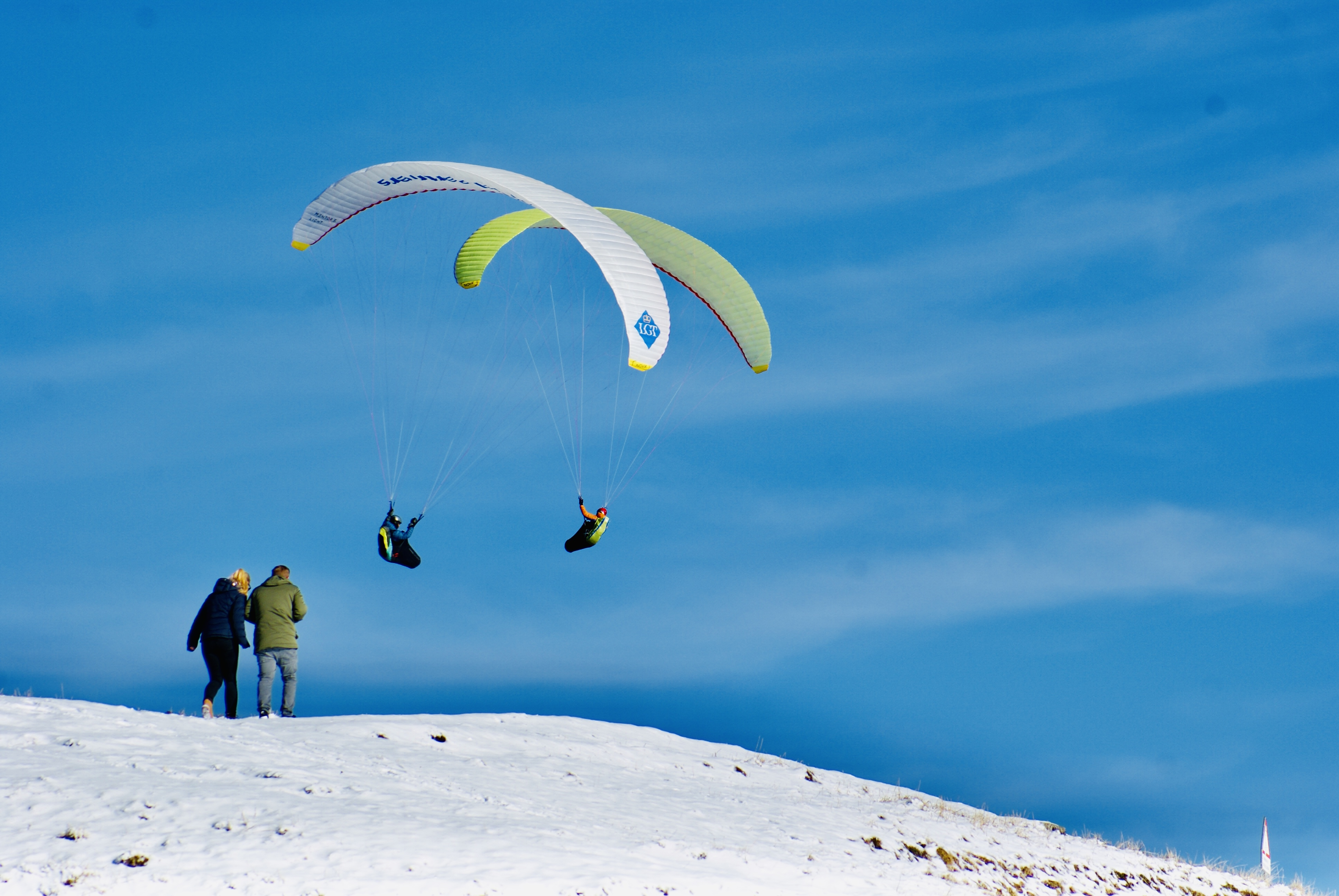
Winter paragliding

Just like sailplanes and hang gliders, paragliders use thermals to extend the time in the air. Air speed, glide ratio and flight distances are superior to the ones achieved by paragliders. Paragliders on the other hand are able to also facilitate thermals that are too small (because of the much larger turn radius) or too weak for gliding.

Paragliding can be of local importance as a commercial activity. Paid accompanied tandem flights are available in many mountainous regions, both in the winter and in the summer. In addition, there are many schools offering courses and guides who lead groups of more experienced pilots exploring an area. Finally, there are the manufacturers and the associated repair and after-sales services. Paraglider-like wings also find other uses, for example, in ship propulsion and wind energy exploitation, and are related to some forms of power kite. Kite skiing uses equipment similar to paragliding sails.

== National organizations ==
- Association of Paragliding Pilots and Instructors (APPI)—International
- Federación Argentina de Vuelo Libre (FAVL) – Argentina
- Sports Aviation Federation of Australia (SAFA), previously known as the Hang Gliding Federation of Australia (HGFA) – Australia
- Hang Gliding and Paragliding Association of Canada (HPAC) – Canada
- Fédération Française de Vol Libre (FFVL) – France
- Georgian Paragliding Federation (GPF) – Georgia
- Deutscher Hängegleiter Verband (DHV; Eng. German hang gliding association) – Germany
- The Hungarian Free Flying Association (HFFA) – Hungary
- South African Hang Gliding and Paragliding Association (SAHPA) – South Africa
- Swiss Hang Gliding Association (SHV/FSVL) – Switzerland
- Paragliding Federation of Ukraine (PFU) – Ukraine
- British Hang Gliding and Paragliding Association (BHPA) – United Kingdom
  - Flyability – BHPA associated charity for disabled paragliding and hang gliding
- United States Hang Gliding and Paragliding Association (USHPA) – United States
- Asociacion Uruguaya de Parapentes (ASUP) – Uruguay
