= British Hang Gliding and Paragliding Association =

British governing body for paragliding and hang gliding

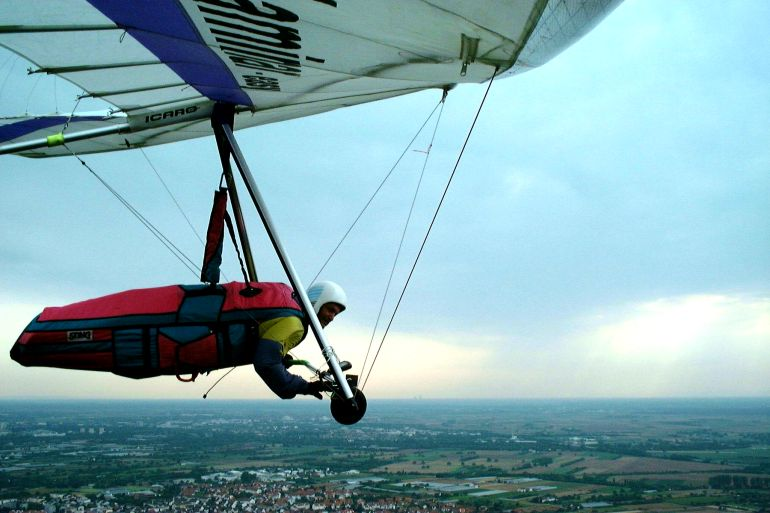
Hang glider in mid air

The British Hang Gliding and Paragliding Association (BHPA), based in Leicester, is the governing body in the United Kingdom for hang gliding and paragliding.

== Association details ==
The BHPA is recognised by the Fédération Aéronautique Internationale, the Royal Aero Club, and the Civil Aviation Authority. The association has registered schools across the country, where initial paragliding or hang gliding training must be undertaken.

The BHPA was formed in 1992 by the merging of the British Hang Gliding Association and the British Association of Parascending Clubs. Since then the sport has grown considerably, and now has over 60 affiliate clubs with a combined total of about 7,000 individual members. The association exists primarily to promote safety within the sport. Each month the BHPA publishes a magazine, Skywings, which is provided free to its members.

The BHPA has an associated charity, Flyability, that aims to make hang gliding and paragliding accessible to disabled people.

== Proficiency levels ==
The BHPA club system runs on a badge competency system similar to that of the British Gliding Association. "Ab initio" training is a two-stage process, with each stage costing about £600.

EP – Elementary Pilot badge

Training and badge award gives a beginner pilot ground-handling training and first flights from the top to the bottom of a gentle hill.

CP – Club Pilot badge

This training and badge award takes the EP pilot to the final level of basic training. The CP training will take the EP pilot and give them experience in flying along the ridge among other more advanced practical areas of hang gliding or paragliding. The trainee pilot will also have to pass basic examinations in aviation law and some air navigation (i.e. rights of way in the air) knowledge. Once the CP badge is gained, the pilot can join a recreational club and fly outside of the school system.

P – Pilot badge

The next level is the Pilot badge. The club pilot will have to show, within a club hill environment, that they have gained a certain level of skill and ability, and can pass examinations regarding aviation law among other subjects. The aim of this badge is to allow the club pilot to leave the hill and fly cross-country using thermal lift. For this the pilot needs a higher level of understanding on aviation law and how airspace priority works in order to avoid disruption or danger to mainstream airspace users such as the military, commercial or private airlines, and general aviation pilots. Flying cross country is not approved until the Pilot badge is gained.

AP – Advanced Pilot badge

This is the most advanced level pilot badge.

Other badge levels

Additionally, other badges can be earned, which include: the Club Coach badge (gained by going on a weekend training course to learn how to 'coach' and advise those new pilots just out of school); the Senior Club Coach badge (usually a very experienced club pilot who can oversee certain types of post-school coaching); the Tandem badge (awarded after a short training course to learn how to fly a tandem—pilot and passenger—paraglider).

== UK flying sites ==
Most flying sites in the UK have rules of operation, often agreed to after hard fought negotiations with the land-owners or tenant farmers. It is necessary to know a site's rules before flying there.

=== Club system ===
The BHPA Club system in the UK is important, as it is these local clubs which negotiate with local landowners to open flying sites. As most land in the UK is privately owned and there are very few public access flying sites, clubs often pay landowners to allow their members to operate from nearby hill sites. Many of these clubs are protective of their sites and do not allow non-members to fly them. Some clubs associate with each other to widen the sites available to the clubs and their associate members.

=== Open Sites ===
There are some hill sites that are defined as open. This means they are open to other clubs' members. It is important for any pilot who intends to fly an open site to make sure they understand and follow the site's rules. Often the hill may be a public place but the local club will have negotiated bottom-field landing rights from a local farmer. A pilot who ignores the rules may risk losing the site for everyone.
