= X-Pyr =

Paragliding race in the Pyrenees

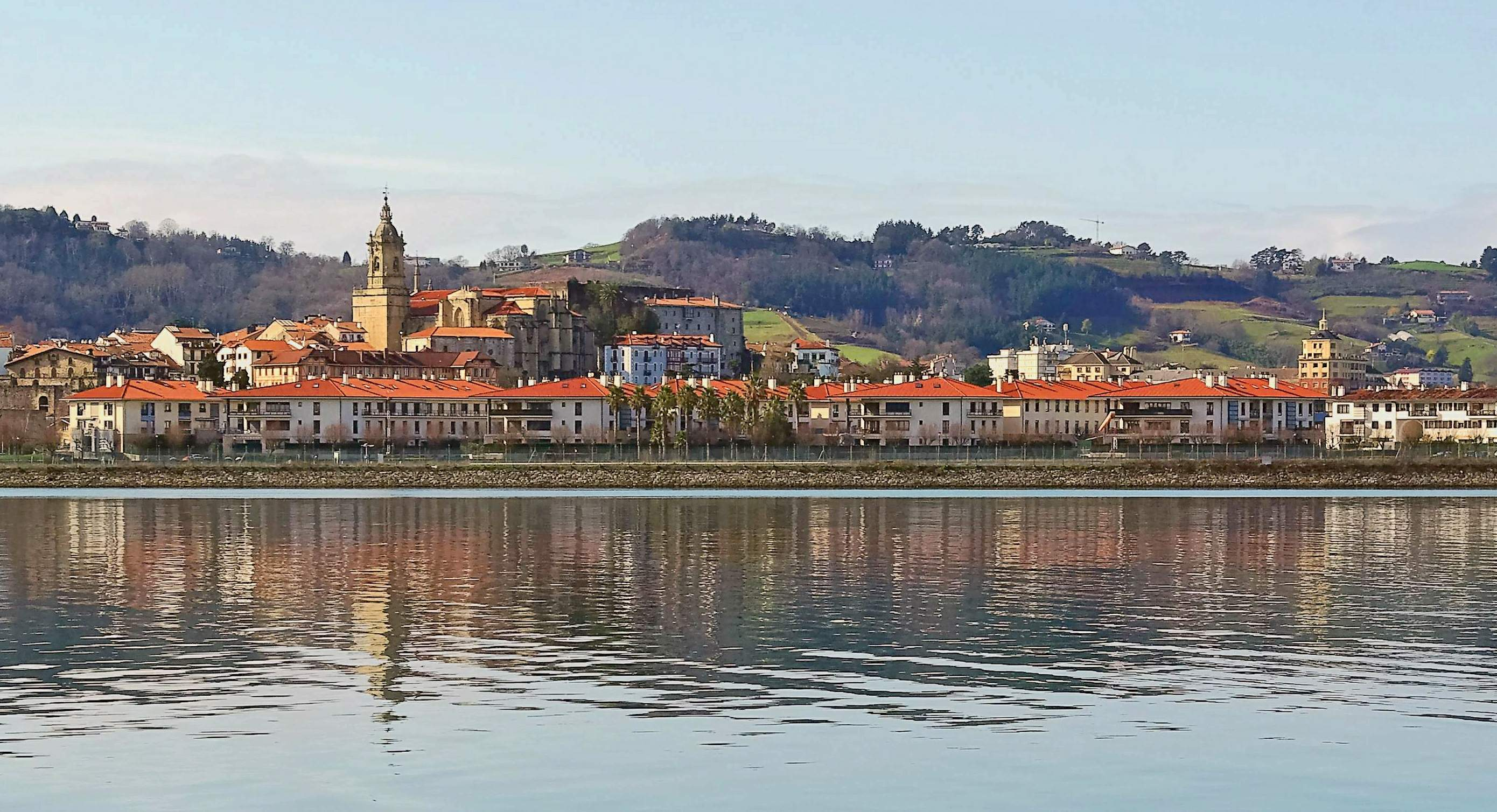
Hondarribia, the Spanish-Basque border town where the X-Pyr race starts

The X-Pyr is an international multi-day "hike-and-fly" paragliding endurance race. The competition route traverses the Pyrenees mountain range from west to east, starting near Hondarribia, Spain, on the Bay of Biscay and finishing near the France-Spain border along the Mediterranean Sea.

== Race details ==
The X-Pyr race was founded by Íñigo Redin, who was inspired to create a Pyrenees version of the Red Bull X-Alps race that crosses the Alps. Since the first iteration in 2012, the race has been held biennially. Generally, the X-Pyr occurs in even-numbered years to avoid overlap with the X-Alps race, which happens in odd years. The 2020 race was cancelled due to the COVID-19 pandemic. There have been five editions of the race, most recently in 2022. All four editions between 2014 and 2022 were won by Swiss pilot Chrigel Maurer. In June 2024, Austrian pilot Simon Oberrauner won the 2024 X-Pyr edition, reaching the goal in 101:52:17 (hr:min:sec), 39 minutes before runner-up Christian Schugg from Germany.

The routes of the five X-Pyr iterations to date have all started in Hondarribia and ended in El Port de la Selva, both in Spain, on the Atlantic and Mediterranean coasts, respectively. The intermediate turnpoints vary from year to year, but remain roughly along the Pyrenees and the France-Spain border. Of the 42 pilots who started the 2022 race, four reached the final goal of El Port de la Selva. In previous races, three to eight competitors finished.

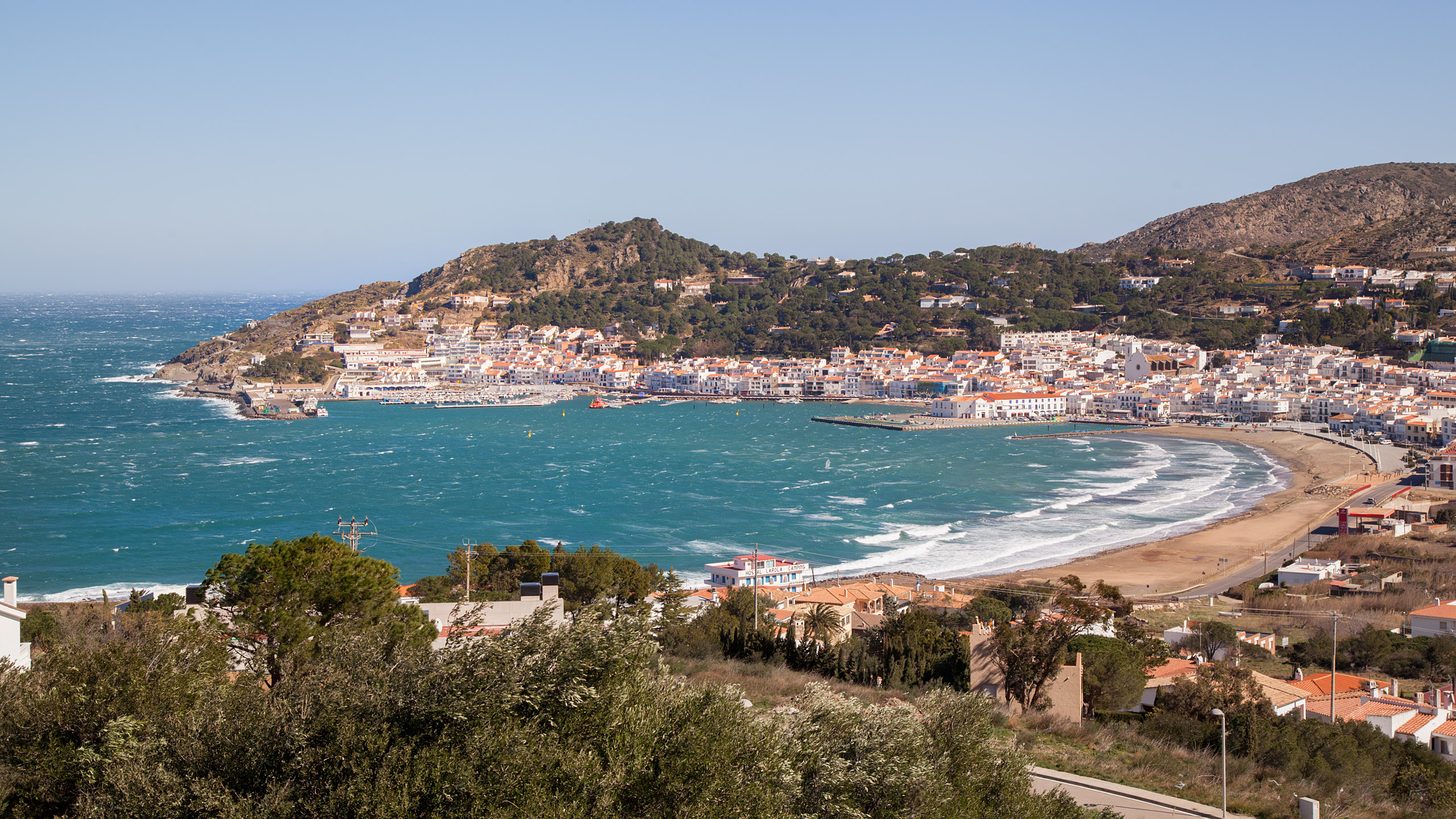
El Port de la Selva - X-Pyr Goal

Like the X-Alps and other hike-and-fly paragliding races, competing pilot-athletes must complete all parts of the declared course by either flying their paraglider or hiking. They must pass all specified intermediate turnpoints in the specified sequence. The first to arrive at the declared destination, or "goal", is declared winner. Race participants must carry their paraglider, harness and other related equipment in their backpack while hiking. They each declare one official ground crew member, who assists the pilot with food and logistics but is not allowed to carry the essential flying gear. Both pilot and ground crew are continuously tracked by GPS/GNSS loggers/trackers during the race to monitor their progress. Any airspace violations, or flying during the mandatory rest period between 21:00 to 07:00, may result in penalties ranging from extra time to disqualification. (Note: Mandatory rest hours and other rules are specified for each edition, the hours mentioned were for the 2022 edition.)
