= Gavin McClurg =

American adventurer

Gavin Noll McClurg (born April 21, 1972) is an American paragliding pilot, adventurer and offshore sailor. As a paraglider, he pioneered a route over the Alaska Range along with Dave Turner, and completed several expeditions over remote areas across North America. As a sailor, he circumnavigated the Earth twice.

== Paragliding career ==
McClurg set the free-distance USA foot launch paragliding record at 387 km in 2013, taking off from Sun Valley, Idaho. He was awarded the National Geographic Adventurer of the Year nomination in 2015 for an 18-day crossing of the Canadian Rockies from McBride, British Columbia to the US border with Will Gadd, documented in the film The Rockies Traverse.

McClurg competed in the four Red Bull X-Alps races from 2015 until 2021, finishing in 8th place in 2015.

On May 5, 2016 McClurg set out with Dave Turner to traverse the full length of the Alaska Range by foot and paraglider, unsupported. The 480 mile route had never been attempted by paraglider. McClurg completed the route solo on June 17, 2016 after 37 days.

McClurg is one of the organizers of the XRedRocks: a multi-day hike and fly event that is held yearly since 2021.

After retiring as an X-Alps athlete after the 2021 edition of the race McClurg returned in 2023 as official race reporter.

== Film and video ==
McClurg has been in a number of paragliding and adventure films. His latest, produced by the Red Bull Media House include The Rockies Traverse and North of Known, which premiered at the Banff Mountain Film Festival in November, 2016.

- The Rockies Traverse (video) Gavin McClurg and Will Gadd cross the Canadian Rockies to the US border.
- 500 Miles to Nowhere (video) Gavin McClurg, Nick Greece, Matt Beechinor and Nate Scales attempt a vol biv route across Utah and Wyoming
- The Higher You Get, the Higher you Get (video) paragliding in Sun Valley, Idaho
- Surfing the Sierras (video) Gavin McClurg and a group of paragliders completes a vol-biv route from south to north up the Sierra Mountains of California to the Oregon border
- They Paraglided 800 km in 34 Days and Camped on Mountain Tops from Banff Mountain Film Festival (video)
- These guys paraglide to their campsites (video) released 2014, from National Geographic
- The Dune Discovery (video) documents kitesurfing, surfing, paragliding and sailing around the world on a five-year expedition

== Television ==
McClurg has been featured in several television shows such as "Locals" and "Dispatches" on Outside Television. He has also done commercial work for Ford and Subaru.

== Cloudbase Mayhem Podcast ==
McClurg started his podcast Cloudbase Mayhem in March 2015 using footage from an interview with Bill Belcourt that was initially recorded for his video 500 Miles to Nowhere for his first episode. Since then he has released more than 200 episodes (as of 2023) of educational interviews.

The podcast earned him the Salewa Trophy for sportsmanship during the 2021 edition of the Red Bull X-Alps.

== Book ==
McClurgs first book Advanced Paragliding: What I've learned from the world's best pilots was published in April 2021. It is a collection of tips and stories taken from the first one hundred episodes of his podcast. It includes insights from Adel Honti, Alex Robé, Armin Harich, Bruce Goldsmith, Chrigel Maurer, Cody Mittanck, Dustin Martin, Honza Rejmanek, Jeff Shapiro, Jocky Sanderson, Kelly Farina, Maxime Bellemin, Nick Neynens, Pál Takáts, Rafael Saldini, Russ Ogden, Thomas Theurillat and Will Gadd.
