= Red Bull X-Alps =

Paragliding race

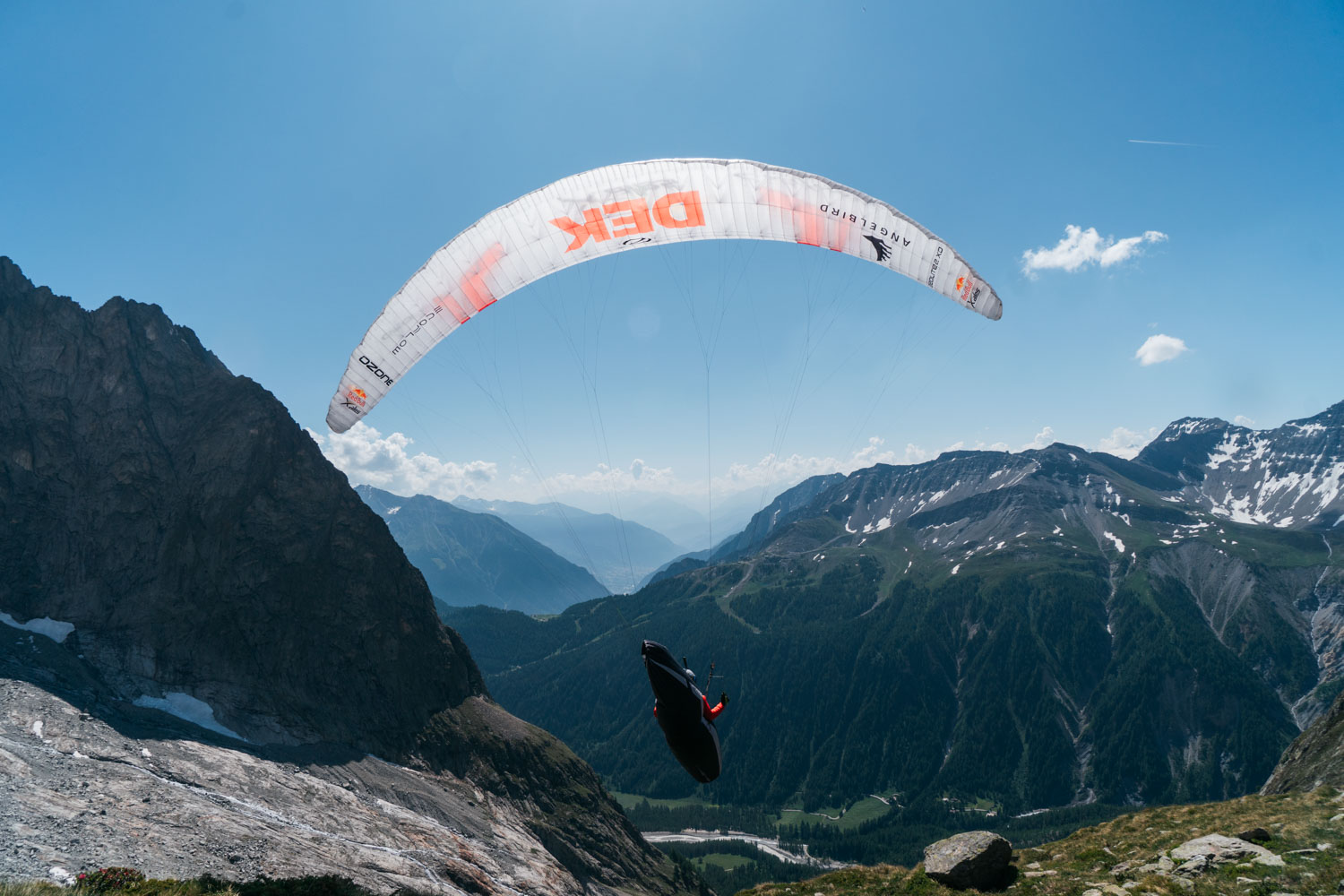
Red Bull X-Alps 2025 Soutazh

The Red Bull X-Alps is a paragliding adventure race in which athletes hike or fly approximately 1,200 km across the Alps. It first launched in 2003 and has taken place every other year. Around 30 athletes take part, navigating their way via a predetermined set of turn points that vary with each race. Every kilometer must be covered either on foot or by paraglider – athletes either hike carrying their wing, or they fly, carried by their wing.

Teams consist of one athlete and one official supporter, whose role it is to provide strategic advice, weather reports, and psychological and nutritional support. In practise, many athletes have two or three supporters.

Originally the race followed a course from the Salzburg region to Monaco. (The exact start and finish has varied over the years.) Inherent in the race’s early appeal was the adventure of journeying from the mountains to the sea, following the length of the Alps from east to west.

The race last finished in Monaco in 2019. For the 2021 and 2023 editions the Red Bull X-Alps followed a circular route around the Alps finishing in Zell am See, Austria. The 2025 route is a figure-of-eight course, also finishing in Zell am See. The exact route is normally unveiled in March before the race start.

All editions of the race from 2009 to 2023 were won by Christian Maurer, while Aaron Durogati won the 2025 edition. Red Bull X-Alps is often credited with the revolution in lightweight paragliding equipment design, helping to kick-start "hike and fly" as its own paragliding discipline.

== History ==
All routes so far: ● 2003● 2005● 2007● 2009● 2011● 2013● 2015● 2017● 2019● 2021● 2023

The concept for the Red Bull X-Alps was developed by Austrian pilot Hannes Arch who saw a TV documentary in which German pilot Toni Bender crossed the Alps from North to South by paraglider, carrying all his equipment, sleeping rough and hiking parts of the way.

"I thought it would be cool to base a paragliding competition on this format and developed a basic concept for it - and the idea was born! Together with Red Bull, we have developed it over the years to be the Red Bull X-Alps it is today - the toughest and most extreme endurance and outdoor race in the world. Its simplicity is what makes it most appealing. We start in Salzburg and whoever arrives in Monaco first wins. That's it. It's about body and soul, not about hundreds of rules and regulations," Arch has said.

When conditions are good, athletes use paragliders to fly, and when they are not they must run or hike, carrying their paraglider and other mandatory equipment. The use of tunnels and all other forms of transport are not permitted.

The first edition led from Austria's Dachstein Glacier to Monaco via Germany's highest mountain, the Zugspitze, Mont Blanc and Mont Gros in France. Seventeen athletes and their support teams covered a distance of 800 kilometers as the crow flies.

Over the years the route and the turn points have changed. From 2009 to 2021 the race started from the Austrian city of Salzburg. During the Monaco years due to airspace restrictions, the clock officially stopped for athletes at the turn point above the city state, situated at Mt Gros, then later Peille. Athletes would then make a ceremonial flight to a landing float in the sea. This was situated off the beach of Le Larvotto. By 2019 it was becoming increasingly difficult to secure permissions and the landing float was moved to Roquebrune-Cap-Martin.

At 1,031 kilometers, the 2013 course was the longest in the history of the race and the race has steadily increased in distance. In 2019 the route was 1,138km, 2021 it was 1,238km and 2023 it was 1,223km. The 2025 route is 1,283km.

New to the 2015 race was the Powertraveller Prologue, a one-day hike and paragliding contest in the Salzburgerland region. Starting and finishing in Fuschl am See, athletes were required to hike or fly a 38 km course around two turn points, the Zwölferhorn and Schafberg peaks. It was won by Paul Guschlbauer in 2h 21m. The Prologue has been a feature of the race ever since.

Thanks to GPS-Live Tracking, all athletes can be followed in real time on the official website throughout the race.

== Rules ==
The first athlete to reach goal wins the race, which ends 48 hours later but not before a set finish time as defined by organizers. Athletes who have not reached the final destination within this time are ranked according to the distance left to the final destination.

Since the 2011 edition, athletes are forced to have a mandatory rest overnight and stay within a radius of 250m of their resting position for safety reasons. In 2013, the mandatory break was extended by 1.5 hours, from 22:30 to 05:00. In 2023 the rest period was increased by half-an-hour. Athletes had to rest for a minimum of seven consecutive hours everyday between 9pm and 6am. Between the hours of 9pm and 6am athletes are not allowed to fly.

New in 2013 was the so-called Night Pass, which allowed athletes to hike through the night. The idea behind the Night Pass was to allow athletes a chance to gain a strategic advantage. In reality, it can help an athlete reach a better overnight location, but using it to hike all the night comes at a cost of increased fatigue, which is not helpful to flight.

Since 2013, prototypes are banned from the competition and all equipment, including paragliders, harnesses, and helmets must comply with EN or LTF certifications.

== X-Alps 2003 ==
=== Route ===
The first course took the athletes from the Dachstein Glacier in Austria to Monaco. It was defined by two turn points, all of which had to be taken within a radius of 100 meters. Over the years the route and the turn points have changed.

#	Turnpoint	
1	Switzerland	pass over Verbier
2	France	Mont Gros

=== Teams and results ===
Of the 17 competitors who started the race on July 14, 2003, on the Dachstein, only three made it to Monaco. All others completed between 30% and 90% of the course.

Rank	Team	Athlete	Time	Distance covered
1	SUI	(Switzerland) Kaspar Henny	11 Days and 22:55:30 Hours	
2	FRA	(France) David Dagault	12 Days and 03:20 Hours	
3	GER1	(Germany) Stefan Bocks	12 Days and 08 Hours	
4	GER2	(Germany) Thomas Friedrich		672 km
5	SUI2	(Switzerland) Urs Lötscher		668 km
6	SLO	(Slovenia) Uros Rozic		657 km
7	CAN	(Canada) Will Gadd		656 km
8	GER3	(Germany) Holger Herfurth		648 km
9	ROM	(Romania) Toma Coconea		618 km
10	AUT2	(Austria) Walter Holzmüller		554 km
11	TUR	(Turkey) Buhara Arif Kemal		525 km
12	POL	(Poland) Krzysztof Ziolkowski		522 km
13	ITA	(Italy) Andy Frötscher		511 km
14	AUT1	(Austria) Gerhard Gassner		486 km
15	MEX	(Mexico) Carlos Carsolio		462 km
16	BUL	(Bulgaria) Slavi Vasilev		357 km
17	GBR	(United Kingdom) Jon Shaw		263 km

== X-Alps 2005 ==
=== Route ===
Dachstein Glacier, Austria, to Monaco.

#	Turnpoint	
1	Germany	Zugspitze
2	France/Italy	Mont Blanc
3	France	Mont Gros

=== Teams and results ===
17 athletes, two of which were women, competed in the second Red Bull X-Alps, starting on August 1, 2005. Four teams reached the final destination while three teams had to withdraw from the race due to injury. All others completed between 25% and 88% of the distance.

Rank	Team	Athlete	Supporter	Time
1	SUI3	(Switzerland) Alex Hofer	(Switzerland) Heinz Haunschild	12 Days and 01:20 Hours
2	SUI2	(Switzerland) Urs Lötscher	(Switzerland) Andreas Wild	+ 1 Day, 1 Hour
3	SUI1	(Switzerland) Kaspar Henny (defending champion)	(Switzerland) Elio Baffioni	Finished, Time Unknown
4	AUT1	(Austria) Helmut Eichholzer	(Switzerland) Elisabeth Rauchenberger	Finished, Time Unknown
5	GER1	(Germany) Stefan Bocks	(Germany) Hansi Keim	
5	GER2	(Germany) Michael Gebert	(Germany) Florian Schellheimer	
7	AUS	(Australia) Benn Kovco	(Australia) Bryan Anderson	
8	AUT2	(Austria) Christian Amon	(Germany) Lars Pongs	retired
9	ESP	(Spain) David Castillejo Martinez	(Spain) Magdalena Alcañiz Soriano	
10	GBR	(United Kingdom) Aidan Toase	(United Kingdom) Jan Toase	
11	GRE	(Greece) Dimitris Bourazanis	(Greece) Marina Zannara	retired
12	IRL	(Republic of Ireland) Niki Hamilton	(Austria) Petra Knor	retired
13	ITA	(Italy) Andy Frötscher	(Italy) Florian Ploner	
14	MEX	(Mexico) Santiago Baeza	(Spain) Christian Fernandez del Valle	
15	ROM	(Romania) Toma Coconea	(Romania) Cornel Doru Calutiu	
16	TUR	(Turkey) Semih Sayir	(Turkey) Osman Grukan	
17	USA	(United States) Kari Castle	(United States) Craig Goddard	

== X-Alps 2007 ==
=== Route ===
Dachstein Glacier, Austria, to Monaco.

#	Turnpoint	
1	Austria	Dachstein
2	Italy	Marmolada
3	Switzerland	Eiger
4	France/Italy	Mont Blanc
5	France	Mont Gros

=== Teams and results ===
30 teams started on July 23, 2007, for the third edition of the Red Bull X-Alps. 12 teams had to withdraw. Five teams made it to the final destination in Monaco.

Rank	Team	Athlete	Supporter	Finish Time	Distance to Goal (as the crow flies)
1	SUI1	(Switzerland) Alex Hofer (defending champion)	(Switzerland) Sandro Schnegg	14 Days and 1 Hour	
2	ROM	(Romania) Toma Coconea	(Romania) Razvan Levarda	+ 04:35 Hours	
3	SUI3	(Switzerland) Martin Müller	(Switzerland) Fabian Zuberer	+ 1 Day and 00:15 Hours	
4	SUI2	(Switzerland) Urs Lötscher	(Switzerland) Nicole Willi	+ 1 Day and 05:50 Hours	
5	JPN	(Japan) Kaoru Ogisawa	(Japan) Masaru Saso	+ 1 Day and 22:54 Hours	
6	GBR1	(United Kingdom) Aidan Toase	(United Kingdom) Bhavna Patel		102 km
7	ESP	(Spain) Ramon Morillas	(Spain) Oscar Atillo		124 km
8	GBR2	(United Kingdom) Ulric Jessop	(United Kingdom) Ruth Jessop		130 km
9	USA2	(United States) Honza Rejmanek	(United States) David Hanning		142 km
10	ITA2	(Italy) Leone Pascale	(Italy) Roberto Maggi		152 km
11	CZE	(Czech Republic) Jan Skrabalek	(Czech Republic) Jaroslav Jindra		159 km
12	FRA2	(France) Julien Wirtz	(France) Adrien Vicier		185 km
13	USA1	(United States) Nate Scales	(United States) Nick Greece		186 km
14	GER2	(Germany) Peter Rummel	(Germany) Martin Walleitner		246 km
14	AUT1	(Austria) Christian Reinegger	(Austria) Wolfgang Wimmer		246 km
14	ITA1	(Italy) Andy Frötscher	(Italy) Michael Pezzi		246 km
17	AUS	(Australia) Lloyd Penicuik	(Australia) John Binyon		283 km
18	RUS	(Russia) Dmitry Gusev	(Russia) Viktor Yanchenko		325 km
19	SLO	(Slovenia) Simon Copi	(Slovenia) Marina Istenic		351 km, retired
20	BEL	(Belgium) Tom de Dorlodot	(Belgium) Eduouard Crespeigne		retired after 437 km
21	VEN	(Venezuela) Raul Penso	(Venezuela) Eduardo Fuhrmeister		retired after 414 km
22	AUT2	(Austria) Gerald Ameseder	(Austria) Thomas Weingartner		retired after 402 km
23	SVK	(Slovakia) Peter Vrabec	(Slovakia) Frantisek Pavlousek		retired after 357 km
24	FRA1	(France) Vincent Sprüngli	(France) Jerome Maupoint		retired after 318 km
25	POL	(Poland) Krzysztof Ziolkowski	(Poland) Grazyna Cader-Ziolkowska		retired after 239 km
26	GER1	(Germany) Michael Gebert	(Germany) Christian Maier		retired after 208 km
27	CAN	(Canada) Max Fanderl	(Canada) Jeff Bellis		retired after 165 km
28	COL	(Colombia) Hugo Jimenez			retired after 140 km
29	GRE	(Greece) Dimitris Bourazanis	(Greece) Manos Kiriakakis		retired after 127 km
30	TUR	(Turkey) Yurdaer Etike	(Turkey) Erdem Tuc		retired after 23 km

Martin Müller was the fastest athlete, however, he was penalized with 36 hours due to an airspace violation in Sion, Switzerland. Müller was taken over by Alex Hofer and Toma Coconea at Mt Gros and only placed third. Winner Alex Hofer traveled 900 km (61% of the distance) in the air and walked 588 km (39%). In comparison, Coconea flew 24% of the distance and walked the other 76% (1,021 km).

== X-Alps 2009 ==
=== Route ===
For the first time the race started from the Mozartplatz in the center of the city of Salzburg, the end goal however remained the same. The number of turnpoints was increased to seven.

#	Turnpoint	
1	Austria	Gaisberg
2	Germany	Watzmann
3	Austria	Großglockner
4	Italy	Marmolada
5	Switzerland	Matterhorn
6	France/Italy	Mont Blanc
7	France	Mont Gros

=== Teams and results ===
The fourth edition was the first one to start from a new starting point. On July 19, 2009, 30 teams started from the Mozartplatz in the Austrian city of Salzburg. Only two teams made it all the way to the final destination in Monaco while 12 teams had to withdraw, were disqualified or taken out of the race.

Rank	Team	Athlete	Supporter	Finish Time	Distance to Goal (as the crow flies)
1	SUI1	(Switzerland) Chrigel Maurer	(Switzerland) Thomas Theurillat	9 Days and 23:54 Hours	
2	SUI2	(Switzerland) Alex Hofer (defending champion)	(Austria) Nicole Schlotterer	+ 1 Day, 09:24 Hours	
3	USA	(United States) Honza Rejmanek	(United States) David Hanning		139 km
4	GBR1	(United Kingdom) Aidan Toase	(United Kingdom) Charlie Merrett		164 km
5	RUS	(Russia) Evgeny Gryaznov	(Russia) Dmitry Gusev		193 km
6	GER	(Germany) Michael Gebert	(Germany) Florian Schellheimer		203 km
7	FIN	(Finland) Jouni Makkonen	(Finland) Toni Leskelä		230 km
8	HUN	(Hungary) Pal Takats	(Austria) Mauritz Volkmer		231 km
9	ESP	(Spain) Ramon Morillas	(Spain) Juan Morillas		237 km
10	BEL	(Belgium) Tom de Dorlodot	(Belgium) Maxime van Dyck		238 km
11	FRA2	(France) Julien Wirtz	(France) Adrien Vicier		245 km
12	ITA2	(Italy) Andy Frötscher	(Germany) Raphael Murphy Graetz		288 km
13	JPN1	(Japan) Kaoru Ogisawa	(Japan) Masaru Saso		297 km
13	CAN	(Canada) Max Fanderl	(Canada) Penny Powers		297 km
15	GBR2	(United Kingdom) Tom Payne	(United Kingdom) Alex Raymont		321 km
15	CZE	(Czech Republic) Jan Skrabalek	(Czech Republic) David Bzirsky		321 km
17	POL	(Poland) Filip Jagla	(Poland) Piotr Goc		423 km
18	SVK	(Slovakia) Peter Vrabec	(Slovakia) Tomas Bernat		457 km
19	AUT1	(Austria) Helmut Eichholzer	(Austria) Andreas Neubacher		disqualified for flying into forbidden zone
20	ROM	(Romania) Toma Coconea	(Romania) Vasile Trifan; Daniel Pisica		disqualified for flying into forbidden zone
21	VEN	(Venezuela) Raul Penso	(Venezuela) Ismael Penso		disqualified for flying into forbidden zone
22	SUI2	(Switzerland) Martin Müller	(Switzerland) Fabien Zuberer		eliminated (injury)
23	FRA1	(France) Vincent Sprüngli	(France) David Bibier Cocatrix		eliminated (injury)
24	NED	(Netherlands) Ronny Geijsen	(Netherlands) Hugo Robben		eliminated (injury)
25	RSA	(South Africa) Pierre Carter	(South Africa) James Braid		eliminated (injury)
26	ITA1	(Italy) Leone Antonio Pascale	(Italy) Maurizio Dalla Valle		eliminated (injury)
27	AUT2	(Austria) Christian Amon	(Austria) Manuel Goller		eliminated (injury)
28	JPN2	(Japan) Masayuki Matsubara	(Japan) Tetsuo Kogai		eliminated
29	AUS	(Australia) Lloyd Penicuik	(Australia) Lewis Nott		eliminated
30	SLO	(Slovenia) Primoz Susa	(Slovenia) Igor Erzen		eliminated

Chrigel Maurer was the fastest athlete and the first to reach Monaco from the air (he landed at Roquebrune Beach and ran to the last turnpoint on Mont Gros from where he flew to the final destination). Defending champion Alex Hofer arrived one day later. The winner traveled 72% (999 km) of the overall distance (1,379 km) in the air and walked the other 28% (380 km).

== X-Alps 2011 ==
=== Route ===
Mozartplatz, Salzburg, Austria, to Monaco.

#	Turnpoint	
1	Austria	Gaisberg
2	Austria	Dachstein
3	Austria	Großglockner
4	Italy	Drei Zinnen
5	Switzerland	Piz Palü
6	Switzerland	Matterhorn
7	France/Italy	Mont Blanc
8	France	Mont Gros

=== Teams and results ===
As in 2009, the 2011 race started from the Mozartplatz in Salzburg. The 30 athletes who had been nominated by the race committee took off on July 17, 2011. Only two teams made it all the way to the final destination.

Rank	Team	Athlete	Supporter	Finish Time	Distance to Goal (as the crow flies)
1	SUI1	(Switzerland) Chrigel Maurer (defending champion)	(Switzerland) Thomas Theurillat	11 Days and 04:52 Hours (24-hour penalty for flying into forbidden zone)	
2	ROM	(Romania) Toma Coconea	(Romania) Daniel Pisica	13 Days and 03 Hours	
3	AUT4	(Austria) Paul Guschlbauer	(Germany) Sara Gudelius		9 km
4	SUI3	(Switzerland) Martin Müller	(Switzerland) Boris Aellen		73 km
5	GBR2	(United Kingdom) Jon Chambers	(United Kingdom) Richard Chambers		113 km
6	GER	(Germany) Michael Gebert	(Germany) Florian Schellheimer		172 km
7	NED	(Netherlands) Ferdinand van Schelven	(Netherlands) Anton Brous		173 km
8	FRA3	(France) Clement Latour	(France) Sylvain Dhonneur		174 km, 24-hour penalty for flying into forbidden zone
9	FIN	(Finland) Jouni Makkonen	(Finland) Toni Leskelä		176 km
10	USA	(United States) Honza Rejmanek	(United States) Dave Hanning		181 km
11	BEL	(Belgium) Tom de Dorlodot	(Belgium) Gatien de Dorlodot		183 km
12	RUS	(Russia) Evgeny Gryaznov	(Russia) Anton Poliakov		241 km
13	AUT1	(Austria) Helmut Eichholzer	(Austria) Wolfgang Ehgarter		246 km
14	CAN	(Canada) Max Fanderl	(Canada) Penny Powers		305 km
14	ITA	(Italy) Andy Frötscher	(Italy) Robert Mur		305 km
16	BRA	(Brazil) Richard Pethigal	(Brazil) Dioclecio R. Filho		327 km, 24-hour penalty for flying into forbidden zone
17	POL	(Poland) Pawel Faron	(Poland) Piotr Goc		350 km
18	ESP	(Spain) Oriol Fernandez	(Spain) Armand Rubiella		389 km
19	GBR1	(United Kingdom) Steve Nash	(United Kingdom) Richard Bungay		385 km, disqualified for flying into forbidden zone
20	CZE	(Czech Republic) Jan Skrabalek	(Czech Republic) Karel Vrbensky		478 km, eliminated
21	RSA	(South Africa) Pierre Carter	(South Africa) James Braid		516 km, eliminated
22	ARG	(Argentina) Martin Romero Garayzabal	(Argentina) Martin Utrera		573 km, eliminated (injury)
23	JPN2	(Japan) Masayuki Matsubara	(Japan) Shinichi Nagashima		620 km, eliminated
24	FRA1	(France) Vincent Sprüngli	(France) Jerome Maupoint		631 km, 24-hour penalty for flying into forbidden zone; retired (technical failure)
25	AUT3	(Austria) Mike Küng	(Austria) Eduard Kumaropulos		677 km, eliminated (illness)
26	POR	(Portugal) Nuno Virgilio	(Portugal) Samuel Lopes		683 km, 24-hour penalty for flying into forbidden zone; eliminated
27	JPN1	(Japan) Kaoru Ogisawa	(Japan) Masaru Saso		739 km, disqualified for flying into forbidden zone
28	AUT2	(Austria) Christian Amon	(Austria) Mario Schmaranzer		755 km, eliminated (injury)
29	FRA2	(France) Philippe Barnier	(France) Herve Garcia		757 km, eliminated
30	NOR	(Norway) Ivar Sandstå	(Norway) Øystein Dagestad		786 km, 24-hour penalty for flying into forbidden zone; eliminated

Defending champion Chrigel Maurer was the first to arrive in Monaco after 11 days, 4h and 52min after covering a total distance of 1,807 km, 1,321 km of which he covered by paraglider and 486 km on the ground.

== X-Alps 2013 ==
=== Route ===
Mozartplatz, Salzburg, Austria, to Monaco.

#	Turnpoint	
1	Austria	Gaisberg
2	Austria	Dachstein
3	Austria	Wildkogel
4	Germany	Zugspitze
5	Italy	Ortler/Sulden
6	Switzerland	Interlaken
7	Switzerland	Matterhorn
8	France/Italy	Mont Blanc
9	France	Saint Hilaire
10	France	Peille

=== Teams and results ===
31 athletes took off from the Mozartplatz in Salzburg on July 7, 2013. A record number of ten teams made it all the way to Monaco.

Rank	Team	Athlete	Supporter	Finish Time	Distance to Goal (as the crow flies)
1	SUI1	(Switzerland) Chrigel Maurer (defending champion)	(Switzerland) Thomas Theurillat	6 Days and 23:40 Hours	
2	FRA1	(France) Clement Latour	(France) Philippe Barnier; Bruno Deloustal	8 Days and 16 Hours	
3	FRA2	(France) Antoine Girard	(France) Nelson de Freyman; Yves Bernard	8 Days and 16:30 Hours	
4	GBR	(United Kingdom) Jon Chambers	(United Kingdom) Richard Chambers; Tom Payne	9 Days and 05:12 Hours	
5	ITA2	(Italy) Peter Gebhard	(Italy) Heidi Insam; Gerald Demetz	9 Days and 07:40 Hours	
6	NED	(Netherlands) Ferdinand van Schelven	(Netherlands) Anton Brous	10 Days and 09:27 Hours	
7	ITA1	(Italy) Aaron Durogati	(Czech Republic) Renata Kuhnova; Ondrej Prochazka	10 Days and 10:28 Hours	
8	SUI2	(Switzerland) Martin Müller	(Switzerland) Stephane Voeffray; Julien Andrey	10 Days and 21:43 Hours	
9	AUT1	(Austria) Paul Guschlbauer	(Germany) Sara Gudelius; Axel Gudelius	11 Days and 05:47 Hours	
10	ROM	(Romania) Toma Coconea	(Romania) Daniel Pisica; Adrian Miclea	11 Days and 11:22 Hours	
11	USA1	(United States) Honza Rejmanek	(United States) Luis Rosenkjer; Jesse Williams		101 km
12	FRA3	(France) Victor Sebe	(France) Vincent Tourangin; Hugues Baschet		113 km
13	BEL	(Belgium) Tom de Dorlodot	(Belgium) Cedric de Bruyn; Sebastien Granville		153 km
14	RUS	(Russia) Evgeny Gryaznov	(Belarus) Tatsiana Spirydonava (Russia) Valeriy Maznev		154 km
15	POL	(Poland) Pawel Faron	(Poland) Piotr Goc; Witold Wladyka		154 km
16	JPN1	(Japan) Kaoru Ogisawa	(Japan) Fumio Miki; Hideo Inaba		168 km
17	ITA3	(Italy) Andy Frötscher	(Italy) Robert Mur (Germany) Michael Schneider		182 km
18	JPN2	(Japan) Shoichiro Tadano	(Japan) Masaru Saso; Naohisa Okada		184 km
19	CZE	(Czech Republic) Michal Krysta	(Czech Republic) Standa Mayer; Jan Skrabalek		229 km
20	GER3	(Germany) Max Mittmann	(Switzerland) Matthias Christen; Roger Christen		261 km
21	AUT2	(Austria) Mike Küng	(Austria) Eduard Kumaropulos (Germany) Renate Schatzl		379 km
22	VEN	(Venezuela) Raul Penso	(Italy) Dario di Gioia (United States) Gabriela Guzman		385 km, 48-hour penalty for flying into forbidden zone; 24-hour penalty for needing to be rescued by a mountain guide in rough terrain
23	CAN	(Canada) Max Fanderl	(Canada) Penny Powers (Germany) Mik Broschart		411 km
24	GER2	(Germany) Lars Budack	(Germany) Jonathan Möller; Wenzel Piel		428 km
25	KOR	(South Korea) Pil Pyo Hong	(South Korea) Kim Min Soo; Ryu Yun Jae		430 km
26	RSA	(South Africa) Pierre Carter	(South Africa) James Braid		553 km
27	ESP	(Spain) Iñigo Gabiria	(Spain) Iñigo Arizaga; Xabier Amorrortu		588 km
28	USA2	(United States) Stephan Haase	(United States) David Hanning; Brad Sander		523 km, retired (injury)
29	AUT3	(Austria) Thomas Hofbauer	(Austria) Christian Grohs; Vera Polaschegg		773 km, eliminated
30	NPL	(Nepal) Babu Sunuwar	(Germany) Charles Kirsten; Andreas Kastler		853 km, eliminated
31	ARG	(Argentina) Claudio Heidel	(Spain) Jordi Tosas; Carlos Fernández Carrasco		877 km, eliminated

At 1,031 km, the route was almost 200 km longer than in 2011. Chrigel Maurer was the first to arrive in Monaco, winning for the third time in a row. He made it in a record time of 6 days, 23h and 40min. He traveled a total distance of 2,556 km, 2,288 km of which he covered by paraglider and 268 km on the ground.

== X-Alps 2015 ==
=== Route ===
The route was announced on March 19, 2015. It follows an arc of Europe's highest mountains, starting in Salzburg, Austria and finishing in Monaco. The 2015 route has ten turnpoints and a straight-line distance of 1,038 km and is more challenging tactically than the 2013 race due to it having less obvious flight paths.

New to the 2015 edition was the Powertraveller Prologue, a one-day hike and paragliding race around the mountains of Fuschl am See. The first three athletes to finish the Prologue were each rewarded with a five-minute headstart in the Red Bull X-Alps race start on July 5 and an additional Led Lenser Nightpass to journey through the night, which is normally a mandatory rest period. First was Paul Guschlbauer (AUT1) 2h21m, second was Stanislav Mayer (CZE) in 2h22m, third was Gavin McClurg (USA2) 2h24m.

#	Turnpoint	
1	Austria	Gaisberg
2	Austria	Dachstein
3	Germany	Aschau - Chiemsee (Kampenwand)
4	Austria	Lermoos
5	Italy	Brenta, Cima Tosa
6	Switzerland	St. Moritz - Corvatsch
7	Switzerland	Matterhorn
8	France/Italy	Mont Blanc
9	France	Annecy
10	France	Peille

=== Teams and results ===
On December 29, 2014 the first 31 teams were revealed. Two more wildcard teams were added to the starters field on January 8, 2015. The race was won for the fourth time in a row by the Swiss athlete Christian Maurer in 8d 4h 37m, flying an Advance Omega paraglider.

Legend
Wildcard Team

Rank	Team	Athlete	Supporter	Finish Time	Distance to Goal (as the crow flies)
1	SUI1	(Switzerland) Chrigel Maurer (defending champion)	(Switzerland) Thomas Theurillat	8 Days and 4 hours	
2	GER3	(Germany) Sebastian Huber	(Germany) Martin Walleitner	8 Days and 22 hours	
3	AUT1	(Austria) Paul Guschlbauer	(Austria) Werner Strittl	9 Days and 4 hours	
4	FRA2	(France) Antoine Girard	(France) Demelin Mathieu	9 Days and 5 hours	
5	FRA4	(France) Gaspard Petiot	(France) Laurent Pezet	9 Days and 5 hours	
6	ITA	(Italy) Aaron Durogati	(Czech Republic) Ondrej Prochazka	9 Days and 6 hours	
7	NED	(Netherlands) Ferdinand van Schelven	(Netherlands) Anton Brous	9 Days and 22 hours	
8	USA2	(United States) Gavin McClurg	(Australia) Bruce Marks	10 Days and 4 hours	
9	GER4	(Germany) Manuel Nübel	(Germany) Christian Schineis	10 Days and 17 hours	
10	NZL	(New Zealand) Nick Neynens	(New Zealand) Louis Tapper	10 Days and 18 hours	
11	FRA3	(France) Nelson de Freyman	(France) Thomas Punty	11 Days and 2 hours	
12	CZE	(Czech Republic) Stanislav Mayer	(Czech Republic) Petr Kostrhun	11 Days and 8 hours	
13	SUI4	(Switzerland) Peter von Bergen	(Switzerland) Philippe Arn	11 Days and 12 hours	
14	KOR	(South Korea) Chi-Kyong Ha	(South Korea) Yun Jae Rju	11 Days and 15 hours	
15	USA1	(United States) Honza Rejmanek	(United States) Jesse Williams	11 Days and 17 hours	
16	POL	(Poland) Pawel Faron	(Poland) Piotr Goc	11 Days and 20 hours	
17	SWE	(Sweden) Erik Rehnfeldt	(Sweden) Peter Back	11 Days and 21 hours	
18	SUI3	(Switzerland) Michael Witschi	(Switzerland) Yael Margelisch	11 Days and 22 hours	
19	AUT3	(Austria) Stephan Gruber	(Austria) Claus Eberharter	11 Days and 6 hours, 48-hour penalty for flying into forbidden zone	
20	USA4	(United States) Dave Turner	(Switzerland) Krischa Berlinger		140 km, did not finish
21	GBR	(United Kingdom) Steve Nash	(United Kingdom) Richard Bungay		178 km, did not finish
22	AUT2	(Austria) Gerald Gold	(Austria) Othmar Heinisch		302 km, did not finish
23	USA3	(United States) Dawn Westrum	(Poland) Jaroslaw Wieczorek		375 km, eliminated
24	BEL	(Belgium) Thomas de Dorlodot	(Belgium) Sebastien Granville		499 km, withdrew due to injury
25	AUT4	(Austria) Pascal Purin	(Austria) Florian Ebenbichler		531 km, withdrew due to injury
26	ROM	(Romania) Toma Coconea	(Romania) Daniel Pisica		555 km, withdrew due to injury
27	RSA	(South Africa) Stephan Kruger	(Bulgaria) Konstantin Filipov		575 km, eliminated
28	GER1	(Germany) Michael Gebert	(Germany) Tobias Böck		575 km, withdrew
29	ESP	(Spain) Ivan Colás	(Spain) Íñigo Arizaga		611 km, withdrew due to injury
30	COL	(Colombia) Alex Villa	(Colombia) Stefan Hodeck		635 km, eliminated
31	SUI2	(Switzerland) Samuel Vurpillot	(Switzerland) Martin Müller		755 km, eliminated
32	GER2	(Germany) Yvonne Dathe	(Germany) Thomas Ide		840 km, eliminated
33	FRA1	(France) Clément Latour	(France) Barnier Philippe	Did Not Start	DNS

== X-Alps 2017 ==
=== Route ===
The route was announced on March 29, 2017. With seven turnpoints and a straight-line distance of 1,138 km, it was the longest route so far.

In 2017, the Prologue returned as the Leatherman Prologue race on June 29. The one-day hiking race which saw no paragliding due to bad weather took place around the mountains of Fuschl am See. The athletes started in Fuschl and reached the Zwölferhorn before returning to Fuschl as fast as possible. The first three athletes to finish the Prologue race were rewarded with a head start on day two of the main race and an additional Ledlenser Nightpass to journey through the night, which is normally a mandatory rest period.

#	Turnpoint	
1	Austria	Gaisberg
2	Slovenia	Triglav
3	Germany	Aschau - Chiemsee (Kampenwand)
4	Austria	Lermoos
5	Italy	Monte Baldo
6	Switzerland	Matterhorn
7	France	Peille

=== Teams and results ===
The competing athletes were announced on November 2, 2016 via social media. Two more wildcard teams were added to the field on January 2, 2017. In 2017, 31 teams took part in Red Bull X-Alps; 12 rookies, as well as reigning champion Chrigel Maurer and legend Toma Coconea, who has taken part in every edition so far.

Rank	Team	Athlete	Wing	Supporter	Finish Time	Distance to Goal (as the crow flies)
1	SUI1	(Switzerland) Chrigel Maurer	Skywalk X-Alps3	(Switzerland) Tobias Dimmler	10 days and 23 hours	
2	FRA4	(France) Benoit Outters	Sup'Air Wild	(France) Damien Lacaze	11 days and 1 hour	
3	AUT1	(Austria) Paul Guschlbauer	Skywalk X-Alps3	(Austria) Werner Strittl		5 km from goal
4	NED	(Netherlands) Ferdinand van Schelven	Skywalk X-Alps3	(Netherlands) Nicole Vincent Piazza		49 km from goal
5	AUT4	(Austria) Simon Oberrauner	Skywalk X-Alps3	(Austria) Christoph Wolf		51 km from goal
6	AUT3	(Austria) Pascal Purin	Ozone Z-Alps	(Austria) Gabriele Müller		86 km from goal
7	HUN	(Hungary) Pal Takats	Ozone	(Austria) Ferdinand Vogel		89 km from goal
8	GER1	(Germany) Sebastian Huber	Advance Omega X-Alps	(Germany) Martin Walleitner		95 km from goal
9	NZL	(New Zealand) Nick Neynens	Ozone Z-Alps	(New Zealand) Ben Neynens		130 km from goal
10	CZE	(Czech Republic) Stanislav Mayer	GIN GTO2	(Czech Republic) Jiří Dlask		172 km from goal
11	ROU	(Romania) Toma Coconea	Advance Omega X-Alps2	(Romania) Adrian Miclea		271 km from goal
12	FRA3	(France) Nelson de Freyman	Advance Omega X-Alps2	(France) Damien Pierre		275 km from goal
13	ITA2	(Italy) Tobias Grossrubatscher	Ozone LM6	(Italy) Lukas Hitthaler		275 from goal
14	USA1	(United States) Gavin McClurg	Niviuk Klimber	(Australia) Bruce Marks		308 km from goal
15	CAN	(Canada) Richard Brezina	Skywalk Poison X-Alps	(France) Julien Maatouk		319 km from goal
16	POL	(Poland) Michal Gierlach	Sup'air Wild	(Poland) Dominika Kasieczko		378 km from goal
17	RUS	(Russia) Evgenii Griaznov		(Poland) Stanislaw Radzikowski		457 km from goal
18	USA2	(United States) Jesse Williams	Skywalk X-Alps	(Czech Republic) Pavel Cibulka		474 km from goal
19	BEL	(Belgium) Tom de Dorlodot	Supair Wild	(Belgium) Sebastien Granville		510 km from goal
20	GER2	(Germany) Manuel Nübel	Skywalk Poison X-Alps	(Germany) Christian Schineis		Withdrew 209 km from goal
21	FRA2	(France) Gaspard Petiot		(France) Laurent Peseta		Withdrew 383 km from goal
22	USA3	(United States) Mitch Riley		Thomas Alfred		Eliminated 530 km from goal
23	SUI2	(Switzerland) Krischa Berlinger		(Canada) Benjamin Jordan		Withdrew 551 km from goal
24	ESP	(Spain) Jose Ignacio Arevalo Guede		(Spain) Francisco Javier Delgado Cid		Eliminated 745 km from goal
25	AUS	(Australia) Che Golus		(Australia) Oliver Delprado		Withdrew 773 km from goal
26	ITA1	(Italy) Aaron Durogati		(Italy) Matteo Vettorel		Withdrew 776 km from goal
27	RSA	(South Africa) Duncan Kotze		(South Africa) Johan De Bruijn		Eliminated 832 km from goal
28	ARG	(Argentina) Claudio Heidel Schemberger		(Argentina) Jorge Zimmerman		Eliminated 967 km from goal
29	AUT2	(Austria) Stephan Gruber		(Austria) Florian Eder		Withdrew 984 km from goal
30	FRA1	(France) Antoine Girard		(France) Laurent Fischer		Withdrew 1048 km from goal
31	MEX	(Mexico) David Liano Gonzalez		(Mexico) Alejandro Gonzalez Medina		Eliminated 1059 km from goal

== X-Alps 2019 ==
=== Route ===
The 2019 route started in Salzburg, Austria and ended in Monaco.

#	Turnpoint	
1	Austria	Gaisberg
2	Austria	Wagrain-Kleinarl
3	Germany	Aschau-Chiemsee
4	Italy	Kronplatz
5	Austria	Lermoos-Tiroler Zugspitz Arena
6	Switzerland	Davos
7	Switzerland	Titlis
8	Switzerland	Eiger
9	France/Italy	Mont Blanc
10	France	Saint-Hilaire du Touvet
11	Italy	Monte Viso
12	France	Cheval Blanc
13	France	Peille

=== Teams and results ===
A total of 32 athletes started the 2019 race.

Rank	Team	Athlete	Wing	Profession	Supporter	Finish Time	Distance to Goal (as the crow flies)
1	SUI1	(Switzerland) Chrigel Maurer	ADVANCE Omega X-Alps 3 22,8	Paraglider Competition Pilot, Coach, Speaker	Andy Schäublin	9 days, 3 hours, 6 minutes	
2	FRA4	(France) Maxime Pinot	Zeolite S	Paragliding instructor / Test Pilot	Jérémie Lager	9 days, 21 hours, 52 minutes	
3	AUT1	(Austria) Paul Guschlbauer	Skywalk X-Alps4 S	Athlete	Werner Strittl	10 days, 8 hours, 45 minutes	
3	FRA1	(France) Benoit Outters	Supair Wild 21	Fireman	Stéphane Garin	10 days, 8 hours, 45 minutes	
5	GER1	(Germany) Manuel Nübel	Skywalk X-Alps4	Tandempilot / Selfemployed	Christian Schineis	10 days, 11 hours, 26 minutes	
6	AUT2	(Austria) Simon Oberrauner	Skywalk X-Alps4	Solo&Tandempilot	Simon Volker	10 days, 12 hours, 5 minutes	
7	FRA2	(France) Gaspard Petiot	Zeolite S	teacher university Lyon1	Laurent Pezet	10 days, 13 hours, 12 minutes	
8	SUI2	(Switzerland) Patrick von Känel	ADVANCE Omega X-Alps 3 22,8	Testpilot by ADVANCE Paragliders	Sepp Inniger	10 days, 13 hours, 46 minutes	
9	ITA1	(Italy) Aaron Durogati	Omega Xalps 3 21,8	paragliding pilot	Elisabeth Egger	10 days, 17 hours, 22 minutes	
10	BEL	(Belgium) Tom de Dorlodot	Supair Wild 23	Pro paragliding pilot / adventurer	Diego Lacroix	10 days, 22 hours, 33 minutes	
11	ROU	(Romania) Toma Coconea	Advance Omega X-Alps 3	Fly Instructor	Adrian Miclea		78.1 km
12	USA1	(United States) Gavin McClurg	Zeolite S	Paragliding pilot/ Athlete, CEO Offshore Odysseys	Ben Abruzzo		206 km
13	ITA2	(Italy) Tobias Grossrubatscher	Skywalk X-Alps4	timberman	Karl Heufler		212.7 km
14	GER2	(Germany) Markus Anders	Skywalk X-Alps4	R&D Harness Skywalk, Coaching, Hike & Fly Athlete	Kilian Hallweger		215.8 km
15	NZL1	(New Zealand) Nick Neynens	Ozone Zeolite MS	Meteorologist	Ben Neynens		263.3 km
16	MEX	(Mexico) Eduardo Garza	Skywalk X-Alps4 XS	Mechanical & Electrical Engineer	Bianca Heinrich		265.4 km
17	RUS	(Russia) Evgenii Griaznov	SupAir Wild 23	teacher	Andrei Mashak		270.3 km
18	SVK	(Slovakia) Juraj Koren	Gin Puma 20,5	Student/tandem/team pilot of Airdesign	Jakub Beňo		290.1 km
19	SUI3	(Switzerland) Adrian Keller	Skywalk X-Alps4 XS	Bicycle Mechanic	Dina Sägesser		350.5 km
20	USA3	(United States) Cody Mittanck	Zeolite MS	Ecologist/GIS Consultant	Huntley Brockie		399 km
21	DNK	(Denmark) Thomas Juel Christensen	Zeolite MS	Project Manager	Hans Kristjan Gudmundsson		423.8 km
22	TUR	(Turkey) Baris Celik	Skywalk X-Alps4	Tandem pilot	Metin Kavuncu		449.1 km
23	USA2	(United States) Willi Cannell	Niviuk Klimber P 19,24	wilderness river guide	Rob Curran		471.4 km
24	HRV	(Croatia) Marko Hrgetic	Triple Seven Qlite MS	Paragliding Instructor	Adrien Colombié		478.3 km
25	JPN	(Japan) Kaoru Ogisawa	PHI Maestro light 18.0	paragliding pilot	Fumio Miki		500.9 km
26	AUT3	(Austria) Helmut Schrempf	Supair Wild 23	Paragliding Teacher, SIV Trainer	Marcus Winkler		503.4 km
OUT	KOR	(South Korea) Chikyong Ha	Gingliders Puma 20,5	Paragliding instructor, test pilot	Younjae Ryu		530 km
DNF	FRA3	(France) Antoine Girard	Zeolite MS	Teacher (computer science)	Martin Beaujouan		554 km
OUT	NZL2	(New Zealand) Kinga Masztalerz	Supair Wild 21	Coaching other pilots and growing tropical waterlilies	Chris Wright		580 km
OUT	COL	(Colombia) Alex Villa	Supair Wild 21	Events Productions	Lucho Jimenez		743 km
OUT	POL	(Poland) Dominika Kasieczko	Zeolite S	paragliding guide pilot, architect	Kuba Poburka		870 km
OUT	LBN	(Lebanon) Rodolphe Akl	Alpina 3 MS	Major in ranger special forces; in charge of the mountain troops	Alexandre Scelsi		990 km

== X-Alps 2021 ==
The 10th edition of the race started on 20 June 2021, at 11:30 AM from the Mozartplatz in the center of the city of Salzburg.

=== Route ===
The 2021 route started in Salzburg, Austria and ended in Zell am See.

#	Turnpoint	Location
1	Austria	Gaisberg
2	Austria	Wagrain-Kleinarl
3	Austria	Kitzbühel
4	Germany	Achental (Chiemgau)
5	Austria	Lermoos-Tiroler Zugspitz Arena
6	Switzerland	Säntis
7	Switzerland	Fiesch
8	France	Dent d’Oche
9	France/Italy	Mont Blanc
10	Italy/Switzerland	Piz Palü
11	Italy	Kronplatz
12	Austria	Schmittenhöhe

=== Teams ===
A total of 29 athletes competed in the 2021 race.

Team	Athlete	Supporter	Comment
AUT1	(Austria) Paul Guschlbauer	(Austria) Werner Strittl	sixth start
AUT2	(Austria) Simon Oberrauner	(Austria) Simon Volker	third start
AUT3	(Austria) Thomas Friedrich	(Austria) Arno Flitsch	first start
BEL	(Belgium) Tom de Dorlodot	(Belgium) Thibault Voglet	eighth start
FRA1	(France) Maxime Pinot	(France) Jérémie Lager	second start
FRA2	(France) Benoît Outters	(France) Tom Remi	third start
FRA3	(France) Théo de Blic	(France) Jules Croibier	first start
FRA4	(France) Laurie Genovese	(France) Alexis Reverchon	first start
FRA5	(France) Damien Lacaze	(France) Stéphane Garin	first start
GBR	(United Kingdom) Steve Bramfitt	(Netherlands) Matthijs Groeneveld	first start
GER1	(Germany) Manuel Nübel	(Germany) Sascha Rentel	fourth start
GER2	(Germany) Markus Anders	(Austria) Daniel Oberauer	second start
GER3	(Germany) Michael Lacher	(Germany) Matthias Kraus	first start
ITA1	(Italy) Aaron Durogati	(Austria) Elisabeth Egger	fifth start
ITA2	(Italy) Tobias Grossrubatscher	(Italy) Simon Grossrubatscher	third start
ITA3	(Italy) Nicola Donini	(Italy) Fiorenzo Graziano	first start
JPN1	(Japan) Kaoru Ogisawa	(Italy) Davide Cardona	fifth start
JPN2	(Japan) Ken Oguma	(Japan) Tetsuo Kogai	first start
MEX	(Mexico) Eduardo Garza	(United States) Bianca Heinrich	second start
NED	(Netherlands) Ferdinand van Schelven	(Netherlands) Nicole van Schelven	fifth start
NZL1	(New Zealand) Nick Neynens	(New Zealand) Nicola McLaren	fourth start
POL	(Poland) Michal Gierlach	(Poland) Maciej Zietara	second start
ROM	(Romania) Toma Coconea	(Romania) Adrian Pochiu	tenth start
RUS	(Russia) Andrei Mashak	(Ukraine) Andrey Bukin	first start
SUI1	(Switzerland) Chrigel Maurer	(Switzerland) Thomas Theurillat	seventh start
SUI2	(Switzerland) Patrick von Känel	(Switzerland) Andy Jäggi	second start
SUI4	(Switzerland) Yael Margelisch	(Switzerland) Joël Bruchez	first start
USA1	(United States) Gavin McClurg	(United States) Reavis Sutphin-Gray	fourth start
USA2	(United States) Cody Mittanck	(United States) Robert Brockie	second start

=== Results ===
Rank	Team	Athlete	Finish Time	Distance to Goal (as the crow flies)
1	SUI1	(Switzerland) Chrigel Maurer	8 days, 6 hours, 30 minutes, 28 seconds	
2	SUI2	(Switzerland) Patrick von Känel	9 days, 2 hours, 7 minutes, 30 seconds	
3	AUT2	(Austria) Simon Oberrauner	9 days, 2 hours, 18 minutes, 25 seconds	
4	FRA1	(France) Maxime Pinot	9 days, 3 hours, 1 minute, 14 seconds	
5	FRA2	(France) Benoît Outters	10 days, 9 hours, 12 minutes, 12 seconds	
6	GER1	(Germany) Manuel Nübel		39.1 km
7	AUT1	(Austria) Paul Guschlbauer		43.5 km
8	ITA2	(Italy) Tobias Grossrubatscher		65.6 km
9	POL	(Poland) Michal Gierlach		88.1 km
10	NED	(Netherlands) Ferdinand van Schelven		93.4 km
11	FRA5	(France) Damien Lacaze		99.3 km
12	ITA1	(Italy) Aaron Durogati		108.1 km
13	ROM	(Romania) Toma Coconea		218.3 km
14	MEX	(Mexico) Eduardo Garza		252.7 km
15	BEL	(Belgium) Tom de Dorlodot		280.3 km
16	GBR	(United Kingdom) Steve Bramfitt		330.5 km
17	USA1	(United States) Gavin McClurg		393.9 km
18	SUI4	(Switzerland) Yael Margelisch		412 km
19	GER3	(Germany) Michael Lacher		429.3 km
20	JPN1	(Japan) Kaoru Ogisawa		512.9 km
DNF	GER2	(Germany) Markus Anders		467.8 km
OUT	FRA3	(France) Théo de Blic		544.7 km
OUT	FRA4	(France) Laurie Genovese		595.2 km
DNF	AUT3	(Austria) Thomas Friedrich		731.5 km
DNF	USA2	(United States) Cody Mittanck		733.8 km
OUT	ITA3	(Italy) Nicola Donini		739 km
DNF	JPN2	(Japan) Ken Oguma		926.1 km
OUT	NZL1	(New Zealand) Nick Neynens		1071.6 km
OUT	RUS	(Russia) Andrei Mashak		1132.9 km

== X-Alps 2023 ==
The 11th edition of the race started with a Prologue in Kirchberg on 8 June. The main race started from Kitzbühel 11 June 2023 and finished Friday 23 June.

=== Route ===
The 2023 route started in Kitzbühel, Austria and ended in Zell am See.

#	Turnpoint	Location
1	Austria	Hahnenkamm
2	Austria	Wagrain-Kleinarl
3	Germany	Achental (Chiemgau)
4	Austria	Lermoos-Tiroler Zugspitz Arena
5	Switzerland	Piz Buin
6	Switzerland	Fiesch
7	Switzerland	Frutigen
8	Switzerland	Niesen
9	France/Italy	Mont Blanc
10	France/Italy	Col du Petit Saint-Bernard
11	Switzerland	Dufourspitze
12	Italy	Cima Tosa
13	Italy	3 Zinnen
14	Italy	Sexten Dolomites
15	Austria	Schmittenhöhe

=== Teams ===
A total of 34 athletes competed in the 2023 race.

Team	Athlete	Supporter	Comment
JAP	(Japan) Yuji EMOTO	(France) Benoit HOSTEIN	first start
AUS	(Australia) Richard Binstead	(New Zealand) Nicola McLaren	first start
AUT1	(Austria) Paul Guschlbauer	(Austria) Werner Strittl	sixth start
AUT2	(Austria) Simon Oberrauner	(Austria) Simon Volker	fourth start
AUT3	(Austria) Thomas Friedrich	(Austria) Arno Flitsch	first start
AUT4	(Austria) Elisabeth Egger	(Austria) Nadine Beck	first start
BEL	(Belgium) Tom de Dorlodot	(Belgium) Thibault Voglet	eighth start
FRA1	(France) Maxime Pinot	(France) Jérémie Lager	second start
FRA4	(France) Laurie Genovese	(France) Alexis Reverchon	first start
FRA5	(France) Damien Lacaze	(France) Stéphane Garin	first start
GER2	(Germany) Markus Anders	(Austria) Daniel Oberauer	second start
ITA1	(Italy) Aaron Durogati	(Italy) Bruno Mottini	fifth start
ITA2	(Italy) Tobias Grossrubatscher	(Italy) Simon Grossrubatscher	third start
ITA3	(Italy) Nicola Donini	(Italy) Fiorenzo Graziano	first start
NZL	(New Zealand) Kinga Masztalerz	Chris Wright	second start
POL	(Poland) Michal Gierlach	(Poland) Maciej Zietara	second start
ROM	(Romania) Toma Coconea	(Romania) Adrian Pochiu	tenth start
SUI1	(Switzerland) Chrigel Maurer	(Switzerland) Thomas Theurillat	eighth start
SUI2	(Switzerland) Patrick von Känel	(Switzerland) Andy Jäggi	second start
SUI4	(Switzerland) Sepp Inniger	André Glauser	first start
SUI5	(Switzerland) Reto Reiser	Mimo Moratti	first start
USA1	(United States) Logan Walters	Reavis Sutphin-Gray	first start

=== Results ===
Rank	Team	Athlete	Finish Time / Status	Distance to Goal (as the crow flies)
1	SUI1	(Switzerland) Christian Maurer	6 days, 6 hours, 1 minute, 51 seconds	
2	FRA2	(France) Damien Lacaze	6 days, 18 hours, 5 minutes, 55 seconds	
3	FRA1	(France) Maxime Pinot	6 days, 18 hours, 47 minutes, 54 seconds	
4	HUN	(Hungary) Pal Takats	6 days, 20 hours, 21 minutes, 35 seconds	
5	SUI2	(Switzerland) Patrick von Känel	6 days, 20 hours, 51 minutes, 58 seconds	
6	AUT1	(Austria) Simon Oberrauner	6 days, 21 hours, 34 minutes, 19 seconds	
7	FRA4	(France) Tim Alongi	6 days, 21 hours, 52 minutes, 10 seconds	
8	ITA2	(Italy) Aaron Durogati	7 days, 0 hours, 49 minutes, 0 seconds	
9	GER1	(Germany) Markus Anders	7 days, 0 hours, 52 minutes, 30 seconds	
10	FRA5	(France) Tanguy Renaud-Goud	7 days, 0 hours, 52 minutes, 44 seconds	
11	AUT3	(Austria) Thomas Friedrich	7 days, 0 hours, 55 minutes, 18 seconds	
12	SUI4	(Switzerland) Sepp Inniger	7 days, 1 hours, 7 minutes, 49 seconds	
13	AUT2	(Austria) Paul Guschlbauer	7 days, 1 hour, 7 minutes, 11 seconds	
14	BEL	(Belgium) Tom de Dorlodot	7 days, 1 hour, 38 minutes, 5 seconds	
15	ITA1	(Italy) Tobias Grossrubatscher	7 days, 1 hour, 43 minutes, 4 seconds	
16	ITA3	(Italy) Nicola Donini	7 days, 2 hours, 29 minutes, 9 seconds	
17	SUI5	(Switzerland) Reto Reiser	7 days, 3 hours, 13 minutes, 19 seconds	
18	GER2	(Germany) Maximilian Loidl	7 days, 3 hours, 24 minutes, 53 seconds	
19	POL	(Poland) Michal Gierlach	8 days, 1 hour, 49 minutes, 25 seconds	
20	USA1	(United States) Logan Walters	10 days, 3 hours, 15 minutes, 28 seconds	
21	AUT4	(Austria) Elisabeth Egger	10 days, 5 hours, 18 minutes, 38 seconds	First female to make goal
22	CAN	(Canada) James Elliott	11 days, 7 hours, 30 minutes, 47 seconds	
23	JPN	(Japan) Emoto Yuji	11 days, 20 hours, 20 minutes, 34 seconds	
24	ESP	(Spain) Jordi Vilalta		68.3km from goal
	AUS	(Australia) Richard Binstead	Eliminated day 12	504km from goal
	NZL	(New Zealand) Kinga Masztalerz	Eliminated day 10	604km from goal
	SLO	(Slovenia) Lenart Oblak	Disqualified day 8	651.4km from goal
	ROU	(Romania) Toma Coconea	Retired day 6	693.3km from goal
	GER3	(Germany) Celine Lorenz	Retired day 7	694.5km from goal
	CHN	(China) Junming Song	Eliminated day 8	734.8km from goal
	FRA3	(France) Laurie Genovese	Eliminated day 6	858.8km from goal
	CZE	(Czech Republic) Ondrej Prochazka	Eliminated day 4	980km from goal

== X-Alps 2025 ==
The 12th edition of the race starts with a Prologue in Kirchberg, Austria on 12 June. The main race starts from Kitzbühel 15 June 2025 and finishes Friday 27 June in Zell am See.

=== Route ===
The 2025 route starts in Kitzbühel, Austria and finishes in Zell am See. It follows a figure-of-eight route of 1,283km via a total of 16 turn points. For the first time since 2019 the route goes deep into France. The route also includes three mandatory Via Ferrata climbs for athletes. For the first time in the race's history one turn point – the Swiss resort of St. Moritz – becomes a turn point both on the way out and return legs of the course.

=== Teams ===
A total of 34 athletes from 17 countries take part in the 2025 race. The lineup includes one female athlete, competing for the second time.

== Winners ==
Year	Winner	Second	Third
2003	Kaspar Henny (SUI)	David Dagault (FRA)	Stefan Bocks (GER)
2005	Alex Hofer (SUI)	Urs Lötscher (SUI)	Kaspar Henny (SUI)
2007	Alex Hofer (SUI)	Toma Coconea (ROM)	Martin Müller (SUI)
2009	Christian Maurer (SUI)	Alex Hofer (SUI)	Honza Rejmanek (USA)
2011	Christian Maurer (SUI)	Toma Coconea (ROM)	Paul Guschlbauer (AUT)
2013	Christian Maurer (SUI)	Clément Latour (FRA)	Antoine Girard (FRA)
2015	Christian Maurer (SUI)	Sebastian Huber (GER)	Paul Guschlbauer (AUT)
2017	Christian Maurer (SUI)	Benoit Outters (FRA)	Paul Guschlbauer (AUT)
2019	Christian Maurer (SUI)	Maxime Pinot (FRA)	Paul Guschlbauer (AUT); Benoit Outters (FRA)
2021	Christian Maurer (SUI)	Patrick von Känel (SUI)	Simon Oberrauner (AUT)
2023	Christian Maurer (SUI)	Damien Lacaze (FRA)	Maxime Pinot (FRA)
2025	Aaron Durogati (ITA)	Lars Meerstetter (SUI)	Simon Oberrauner (AUT)
