= Pendry =

Pendry is a surname. Notable people with the surname include:

- Joe Pendry (born 1947), American football coach
- John Pendry (born 1943), English theoretical physicist
- John Pendry (hang glider pilot) (born 1957)
- Tom Pendry, Baron Pendry (1934–2023), English politician
- Jan-Simon Pendry, the original creator of the Berkeley Automounter
