= Airwave Gliders =

Austrian aircraft manufacturer

- Company type: Privately held company
- Industry: Aerospace
- Founded: 1979
- Defunct: circa 2009
- Fate: out of business
- Headquarters: Fulpmes, Austria
- Key people: Bruce Goldsmith ,Markus Villinger
- Products: Hang gliders, paragliders
- Website: www.airwave-gliders.com

Airwave Gliders was an Austrian aircraft manufacturer based on the Isle of Wight and later in Fulpmes. The company specialized in the design and manufacture of hang gliders and paragliders.

The company was founded in 1979 and went out of business circa 2009. As of 2019, the Airwave website still exists, but it just refers visitors to Bruce Goldsmith Design for support for Airwave products.

The company produced a wide range of aircraft including Bruce Goldsmith paraglider designs, such as the Airwave Magic, Scenic, Sport, Ten and the Wave.

== History ==
Airwave was formed in 1979 in the United Kingdom as a hang glider manufacturer. Its early designs were flown by the leading British hang glider pilots to many World Hang Gliding Championships.

Bruce Goldsmith started the paragliding division of the company's business in 1989. In 1997, John Pendry took first place in the World Paragliding Championships with an Airwave paraglider. Goldsmith later left Airwave to work for other companies.

In November 1999, Markus Villinger bought the company and moved it to the Stubaital, Austria, located in the Central Eastern Alps region. He had previously run Wills Wing Europe, the distributor for Wills Wing hang gliders. Villinger persuaded Goldsmith to return to Airwave in May 2000 and his paraglider designs were produced by subcontractors. Goldsmith worked from his home in Gréolières, France, which has a climate that permits year-round paraglider flight. Villinger eventually sold the company and went into the field of real estate development instead.

Villinger later bought the company back and relocated it to Fulpmes, where he produced his own hang glider designs and Goldsmith's paraglider designs.

By 2008, company had ceased production of its own hang glider designs and became an importer of Wills Wing hang gliders, while continuing to have paragliders manufactured by contractors. It seems to have gone out of business about 2009 as part of the Great Recession.

As of 2016, Goldsmith was still providing technical support and spares for Airwave gliders, through his new company Bruce Goldsmith Design.

== Aircraft ==
Summary of aircraft built by Airwave Gliders:

Paragliders

- Airwave Alpine Extreme
- Airwave Burn
- Airwave Gecko
- Airwave Kiss
- Airwave Logic
- Airwave Magic
- Airwave Mustang
- Airwave Scenic
- Airwave Slingshot
- Airwave Sport
- Airwave Ten
- Airwave Wave
