= Gaisberg Transmitter =

Construction in Austria

Coordinates: 47°48′18″N 13°06′43″E

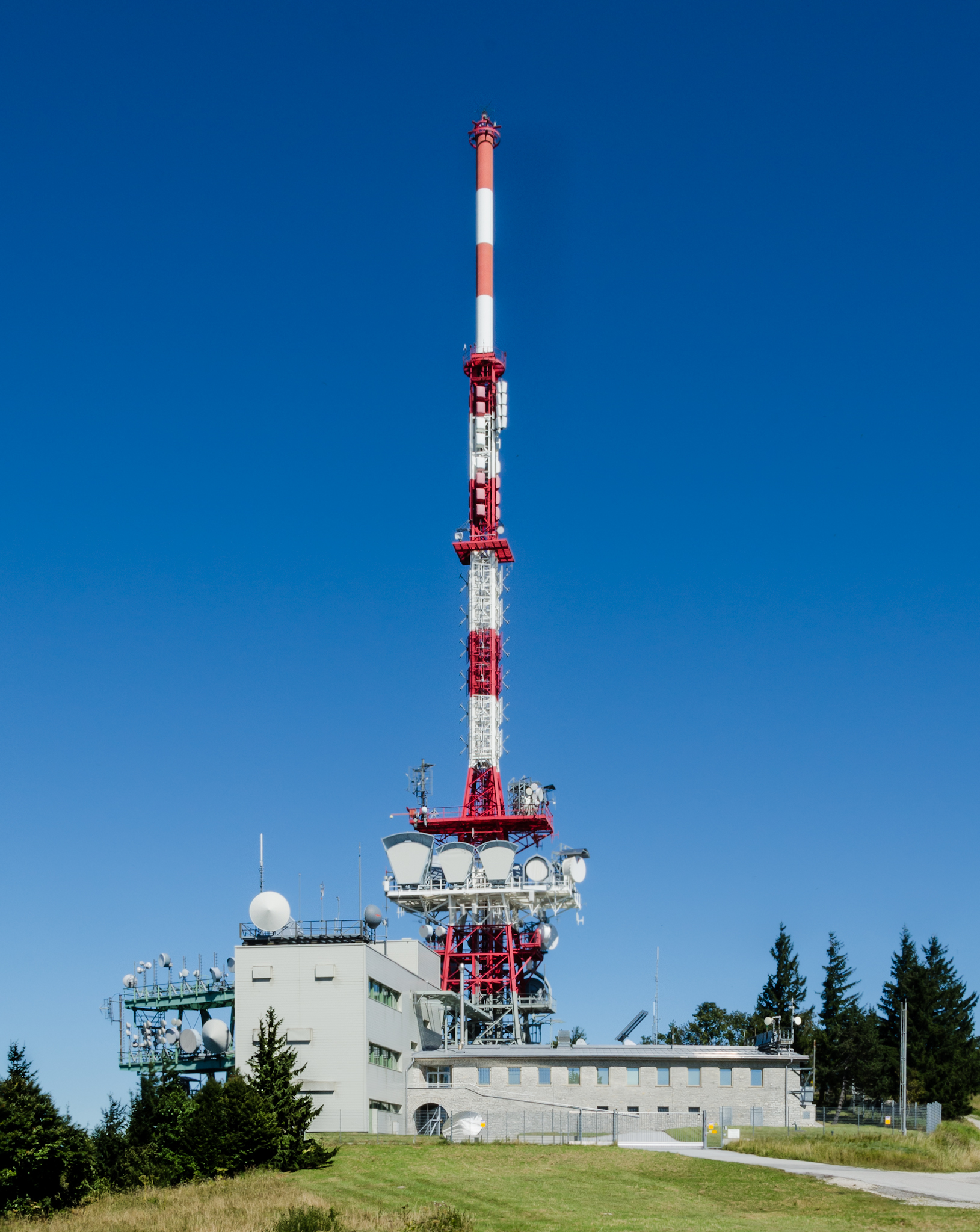

Gaisberg Transmitter is a facility for FM and TV-transmission on the Gaisberg mountain near Salzburg, Austria. It was the first large transmitter in Austria finished after the war and started its work on 22 August 1956 (however, a provisional transmitter already broadcast a VHF radio signal since 1953 with 1kW). It used a 73-metre-high (240 ft) lattice tower and broadcast Austria's first radio station on 99.0MHz and third radio station on 94.8 MHz, each with 50 kW, as well as a TV station on channel 8 with 60/12 kW (picture/sound). During the 1980s an UHF antenna was put on top of the tower, bringing its height to 100 meters.

The ALDIS (Austrian Lightning Detection & Information System) maintains the Austrian Lightning Research Station Gaisberg next to the transmitter.
