= Thomas de Dorlodot =

Belgian adventure paraglider

- Born: 20 June 1985 (age 40)
- Occupations: Professional adventurer; paraglider pilot; public speaker
- Website: www.thomasdedorlodot.com

Thomas de Dorlodot (born 20 June 1985) is a professional adventurer, paraglider pilot and public speaker. Born in Belgium, he is known for his exploratory journeys around the world, flying remote areas by paraglider and paramotor in places such as Pakistan, Madagascar and French Polynesia.

== Biography ==
In 2011 he broke the Asian and Himalayan paragliding distance record with a flight of 226 km in 10 hours and in 2022 he made a pioneering freeflight around the Karakoram mountains of Muztagh Tower, K2, Broad Peak and Gasherbrum of approximately 120 km. As a sailor he has crossed the Atlantic three times, once solo. He has also competed in the Red Bull X-Alps, the biannual adventure race, every edition since 2007, which sees competitors hike and fly a route around the Alps over the course of 12 days.

Other notable firsts and exploratory flights include:

- The first paraglider flight from Machu Picchu, Peru, 2008. De Dorlodot was arrested afterwards.
- The first paramotor flight above the ruins of Tikal, Guatemala, 2010.
- The first crossing of New Zealand's Southern Alps by hike and fly with Ferdinand Van Schelven in 2013.
- The first solo hike and fly crossing of the Pyrenees from Hondarribia to Cap de Creus in 13 days in 2013.
- The first hike and fly crossing of Colombia from Cali to Medellín.
- Pioneering flights across Madagascar in 2016; after one, de Dorlodot landed in a minefield.

De Dorlodot studied communication at IHECS in Brussels and has a masters in photography and movie directing. He runs SEARCH Projects, a production company specializing in sport and adventure documentaries. His films include Karakoram Highway (2013), directed by Olivier Boonjing, winning the public award and the best human adventure award at Coupe Icare Film Festival, and Fly Spiti, directed by Benoit Delfosse winning Best Aerial Adventure Film at the International Air Film Festival 2019. De Dorlodot also produced three seasons of his own TV series, Explore, which was broadcast on the Belgian TV network RTL.

In 2016 he published L’aventure de la création d’entreprise, about the parallels between being an adventurer and an entrepreneur.

De Dorlodot is based in the Azores, where he lives with his wife Sofia Pineiro and two children.
