= Advance Thun =

Swiss aircraft manufacturer

Advance Paragliders
- Company type: Société anonyme
- Industry: Aerospace
- Headquarters: Thun, Switzerland
- Products: Paragliders, harnesses, bags
- Website: www.advance.swiss

Advance Paragliders (Also known as Advance Thun) is a Swiss aircraft manufacturer based in Thun. The company specializes in the design and manufacture of paragliders, harnesses, paragliding carrying bags and paragliding clothing.

Advance is a société anonyme, a share-held company.

The company is one of the world's leading manufacturers of paragliders. They produce a full line of paragliders ranging from training to competition gliders. Many of their glider models have been developed over successive generations of refinements. Gliders include the beginner Advance Alpha, the intermediate Epsilon and Sigma as well as the competition Omega and the two-place Advance Bi Beta.

The 2015 Red Bull X-Alps competition was won by Chrigel Maurer (first) and Sebastian Huber (second), both flying Advance Omega XAlps gliders. They flew 1,000 km (620 mi) over seven days of bivouac flying.

== Aircraft ==
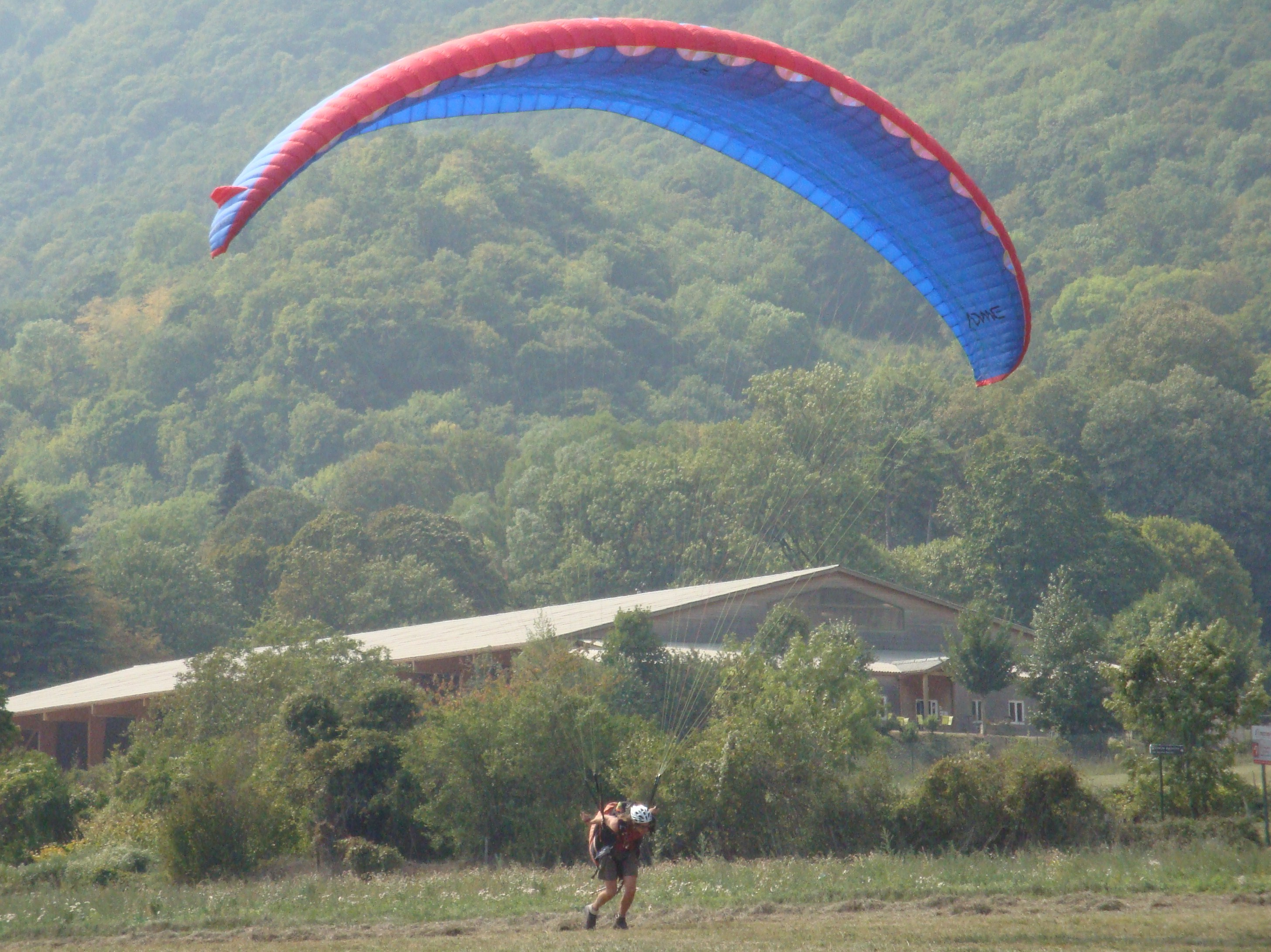
Advance Omega competition paraglider

Summary of aircraft built by Advance
Model name	First flight	Number built	Type
Advance Alpha			paraglider
Advance Bi Beta			two-place paraglider
Advance Epsilon			paraglider
Advance Iota			paraglider
Advance Omega			paraglider
Advance Pi			paraglider
Advance Sigma			paraglider
