= Airwave Magic =

Magic
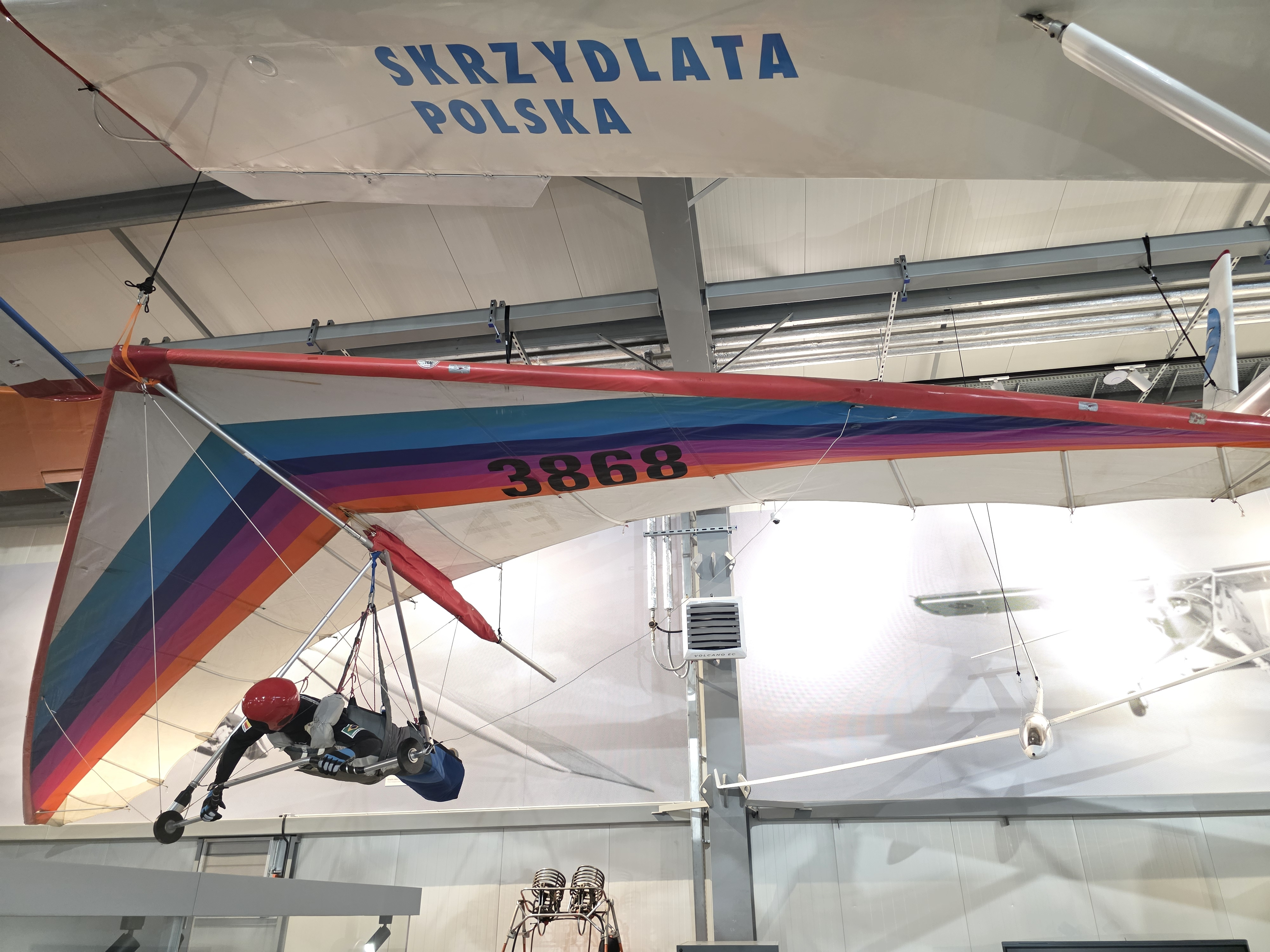
- Airwave Magic IV

General information
- Type: Hang Glider
- National origin: Austria
- Manufacturer: Airwave Gliders
- Designer: Bruce Goldsmith
- Status: Production completed

The Airwave Magic is an Austrian single-place, hang glider that was designed by Bruce Goldsmith and produced by Airwave Gliders of Fulpmes. It is now out of production.

== Design and development ==
The Magic was designed as a competition glider.

The design progressed through several generations of models, including the Magic, Magic 2 and 3, each improving on the last. The three models are each named for their relative size.

== Operational history ==
The designer, Bruce Goldsmith, won the 2007 Paragliding World Championships held in Manilla, New South Wales, Australia, flying an Airwave Magic FR3.

== Variants ==
Magic 3 S
Small-sized model for lighter pilots. Its wing has an area of 24.46 m^{2} (263.3 sq ft), 71 cells and the aspect ratio is 6.03:1. The pilot weight range is 65 to 85 kg (143 to 187 lb). The glider model is DHV 2-3 certified.
Magic 3 M
Mid-sized model for medium-weight pilots. Its wing has an area of 26 m^{2} (280 sq ft), 71 cells and the aspect ratio is 6.03:1. The pilot weight range is 80 to 105 kg (176 to 231 lb). The glider model is DHV 2-3 certified.
Magic 3 L
Large-sized model for heavier pilots. Its wing has an area of 28.12 m^{2} (302.7 sq ft), 71 cells and the aspect ratio is 6.03:1. The pilot weight range is 100 to 105 kg (220 to 231 lb). The glider model is DHV 2-3 certified.

== Specifications (Magic 2 M) ==
Data from Bertrand

General characteristics

- Crew: one
- Wing area: 26 m^{2} (280 sq ft)
- Aspect ratio: 6.03:1

Performance

- Maximum speed: 55 km/h (34 mph, 30 kn)
