= Chrigel Maurer =

Swiss sportsperson (born 1982)

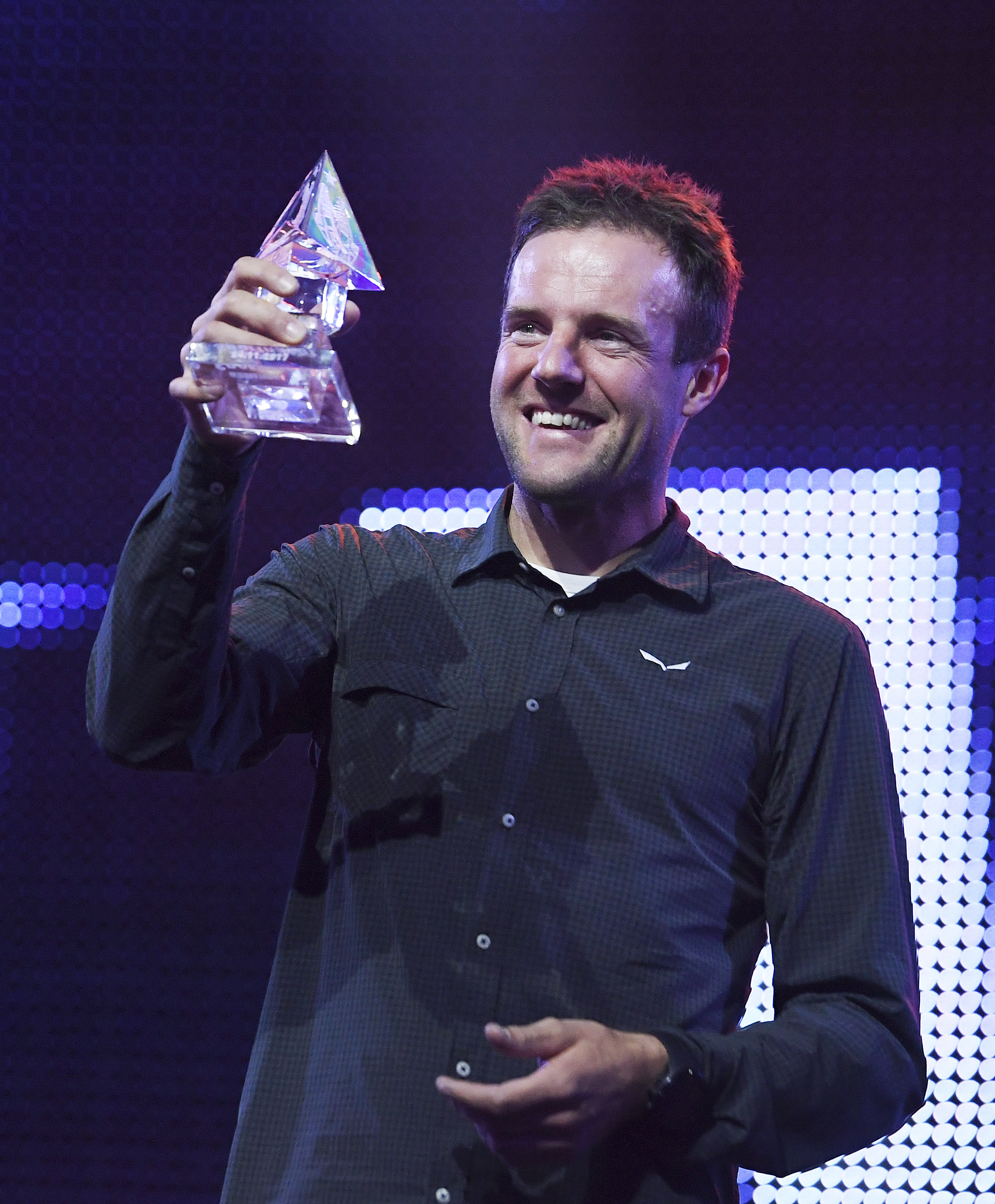
- Maurer in 2017

Personal information
- Nickname: Chrigel the Eagle
- Born: 1982 (age 43–44) Switzerland
- Occupations: Competition paraglider pilot; test pilot; teacher; coach; speaker
- Spouse: Karin Appenzeller (m. 2007)
- Children: 2
- Website: chrigelmaurer.ch

Sport
- Sport: Paragliding

Achievements and titles
- Highest world ranking: X-Alps 1st (2009–2023); X-Pyr 1st (2014–2022); Paragliding World Cup 1st (2005–2007)

Christian "Chrigel" Maurer (born 1982), also known as "Chrigel the Eagle" or the "Eagle of Adelboden", is a Swiss paragliding competition pilot and endurance athlete who has won all eight Red Bull X-Alps "hike-and-fly" paragliding championships between the 2009 and 2023 editions. He has also won the paragliding World Cup, World, European and Swiss championships multiple times, and the Pyreneean X-Pyr hike-and-fly championships four times (all editions between 2014 and 2022), as well as the Swiss Hang Gliding championships in 2007.

In 2009, Maurer set an aerobatic world record for the most "Infinity Tumbles", performing 210 consecutive tumbles in a row in a paraglider.. That record has continued to be surpassed and in 2018 was set at 612 consecutive.

Since 2012 he has worked as advisor and test pilot for European paraglider manufacturers Ozone and Advance. He is also active in teaching and coaching the sport of competition paragliding, with emphasis on young paraglider pilots, and provides motivational speaking to groups and organizations.

Maurer grew up in Adelboden, in the Bernese Highlands, where he attended elementary and secondary schools. At the age of four, in 1986, he flew with his father in a tandem paraglider for the first time. By the age of nine he was allowed to perform "flying exercises" near the ground and "small takeoffs". When he reached the legal flying age of 16, he passed his tests and received his flying certificate. While participating in flying competitions around the world, he worked as a bricklayer for two years, but by 2004 he decided to pursue a full-time career as a professional paragliding competitor and test pilot.

In 2006 Maurer met his future wife, fellow Swiss paragliding champion and World Cup winner Karin Maurer (then Appenzeller), on the Paragliding World Cup (PWC) circuit, where they both competed and won gold medals in their respective categories. The pair was dubbed "dream couple" by the local media, and married in 2007. They have two sons.

His younger brother Michael is also an accomplished paragliding competition pilot.
