= Bruce Goldsmith =

Bruce Goldsmith is a British paraglider pilot, paraglider designer, and the 2007 Paragliding World Champion. He won the title at Manilla in Australia, flying an Airwave Magic FR3.

He has been British Paragliding Champion three times, most recently in 2004. He has also been British Hang Gliding champion twice. He was also ranked #1 paraglider pilot in the World in 2007 by the FAI. He held the World Record declared flight to Goal of 275Km in 2004 in Texas, USA. He was also awarded the Saloman Trophy from the British Royal Aeroclub for design.

Goldsmith is by profession a civil engineer, who started designing hang gliders in 1979 and paragliders in 1989 and was the designer of paragliders for Airwave Gliders for 20 years and designed the Magic, Scenic, Sport, Ten and the Wave. He set up the paragliding division of Airwave - which was already a manufacturer of hang gliders - in 1989. He left to found Ozone Paragliders in 1998, and was Managing Director, designing Ozone's first 4 paragliders: Electron, Proton, Octane and Cosmic Rider. He returned to Airwave in 2000. He moved to the Swiss paraglider manufacturer Advance Thun in 2010 and then in 2012 set up a brand under his own name: Bruce Goldsmith Design or BGD.

He lives in the south of France with his wife Arna Reynisdottir and their three children.

== See also ==
- Paragliding
