= Koppl =

Koppl Koppü
- Municipality
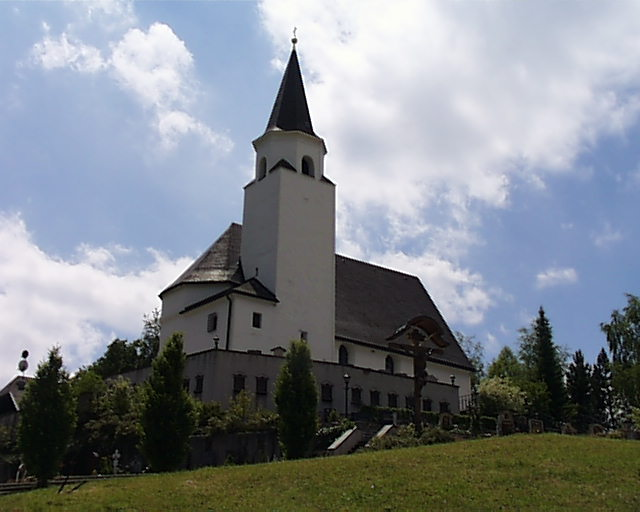
- Parish church

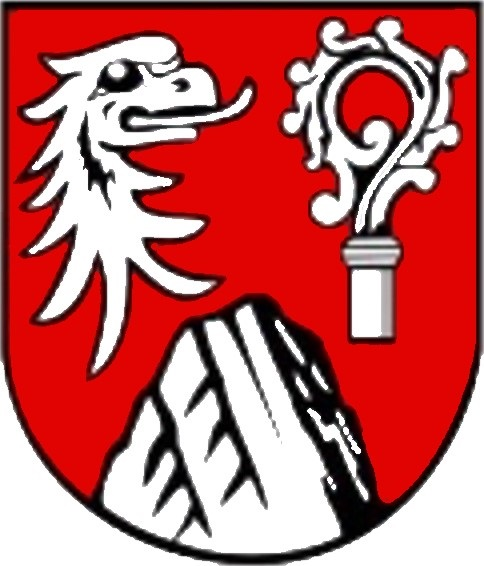
- Coat of arms

- Location within Austria
- Coordinates: 47°48′29″N 13°09′20″E
- Country: Austria
- State: Salzburg
- District: Salzburg-Umgebung

Government
  - Mayor: Rupert Reischl (ÖVP)

Area
  - Total: 20.88 km^{2} (8.06 sq mi)
- Elevation: 755 m (2,477 ft)

Population (2018-01-01)
  - Total: 3,472
  - Density: 166.3/km^{2} (430.7/sq mi)
- Time zone: UTC+1 (CET)
  - Summer (DST): UTC+2 (CEST)
- Postal code: 5321
- Area code: 06221
- Vehicle registration: SL
- Website: https://www.koppl.at/

Koppl (Central Bavarian: Koppü) is a municipality in the district of Salzburg-Umgebung in the state of Salzburg in Austria. In the west it borders on the Salzburg urban area.

== Geography ==
The commune is located in the northern foothills of the Salzkammergut Mountains east of the Gaisberg peak, a recreational area with views over the city of Salzburg. The municipal area comprises the cadastral communities of Koppl proper and Heuberg.

The Salzburgring motorsport race track is located northeast of Koppl.

== History ==
The church of Koppl, mentioned for the first time in the 13th century, was initially a subsidiary of the parish of Seekirchen. For centuries, the manor was owned by the bishops of Chiemsee. In 1823-24 Joseph Mohr (1792–1848), the lyricist of the famous Christmas carol "Silent Night", worked here as an assistant priest.

== See also ==
- Salzburgerland
