= Gaisberg =

Mountain near Salzburg, Austria

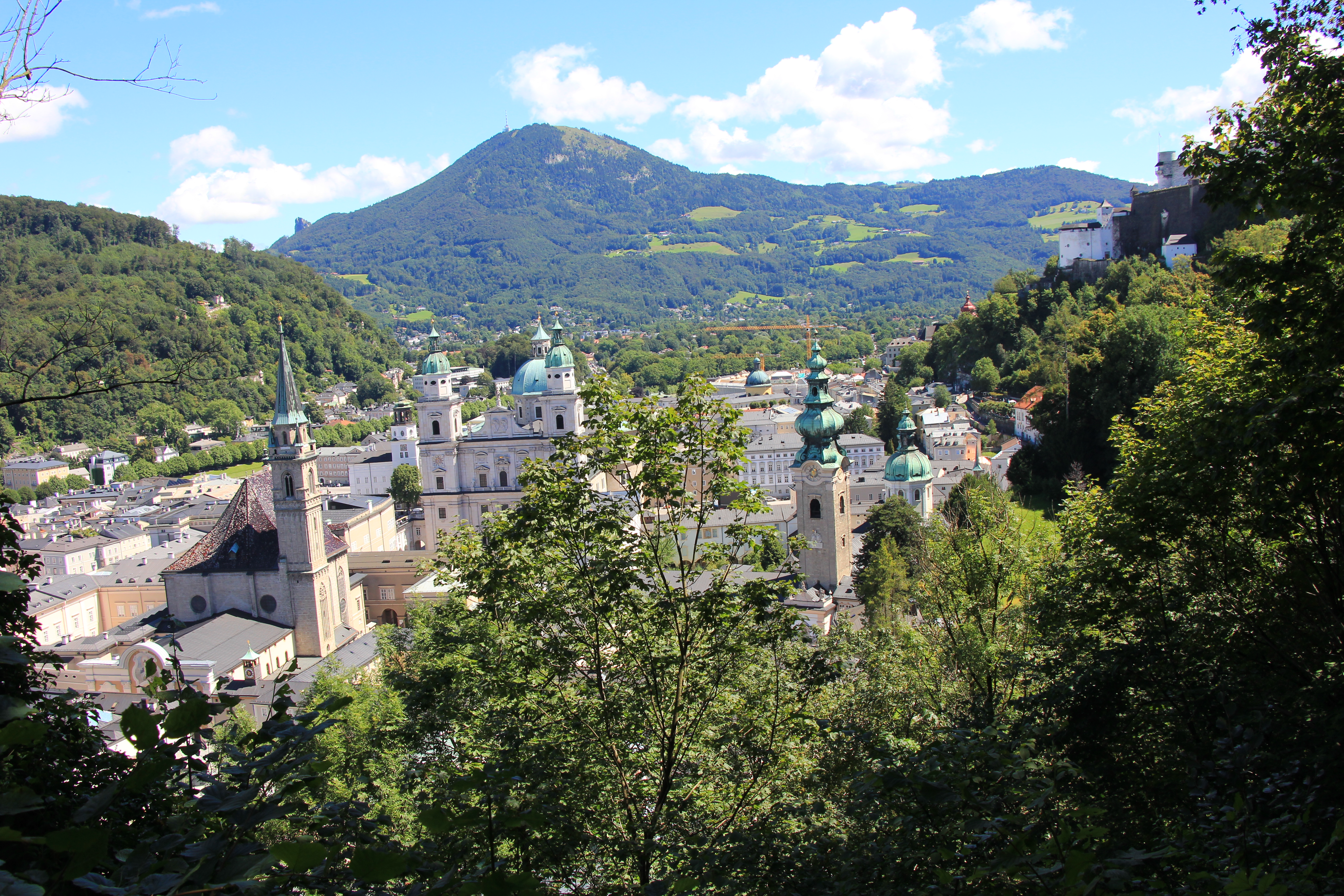
- View from Mönchsberg over Salzburg

Highest point
- Elevation: 1,287 m (4,222 ft)
- Coordinates: 47°48′20″N 13°06′45″E

Geography
- Location within Austria
- Location: Salzburg, Austria
- Parent range: Salzkammergut Mountains

Climbing
- Easiest route: road

The Gaisberg is, at 1,287 meters (4,222 ft) above sea level, a mountain to the east of Salzburg, Austria. It belongs to Salzkammergut Mountains, a range of the Northern Limestone Alps. The mountain is one of the Salzburg Hausberge, a recreational area offering views over the city and the Berchtesgaden Alps in the west. On the top of the mountain is the widely visible Gaisberg Transmitter.

== Geography ==
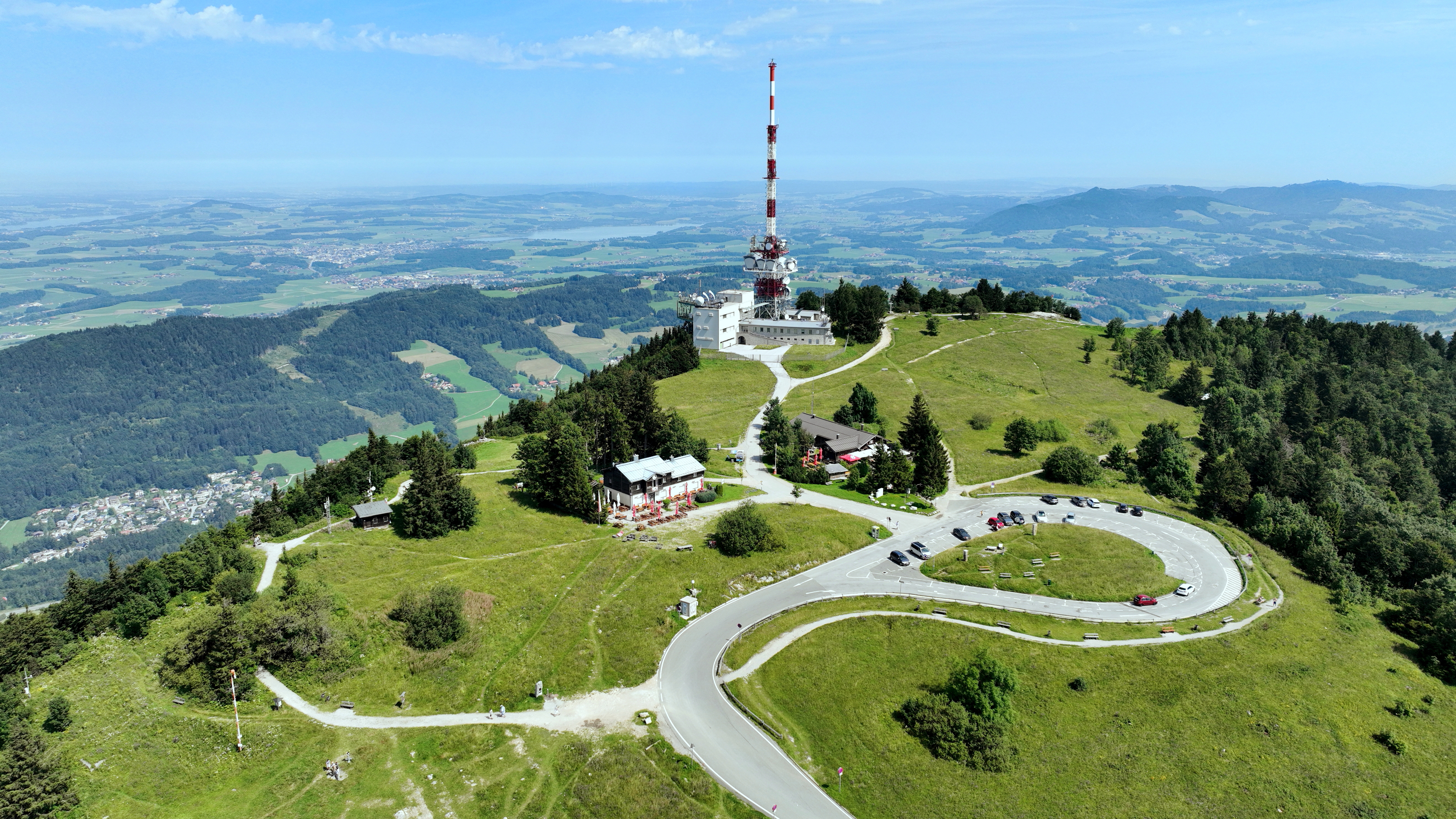
Summit area of the Gaisberg

The mountain is one of the foothills of the Osterhorn Group between the Lammertal valley and the Wolfgangsee; forming the eastern rim of the Salzburg Basin. The western slopes with the Kühberg spur extend to the Salzburg city limits, the adjacent parts belong to the neighbouring Koppl and Elsbethen municipalities. Since 1988 a small part of the woodland is designated as a protected area.

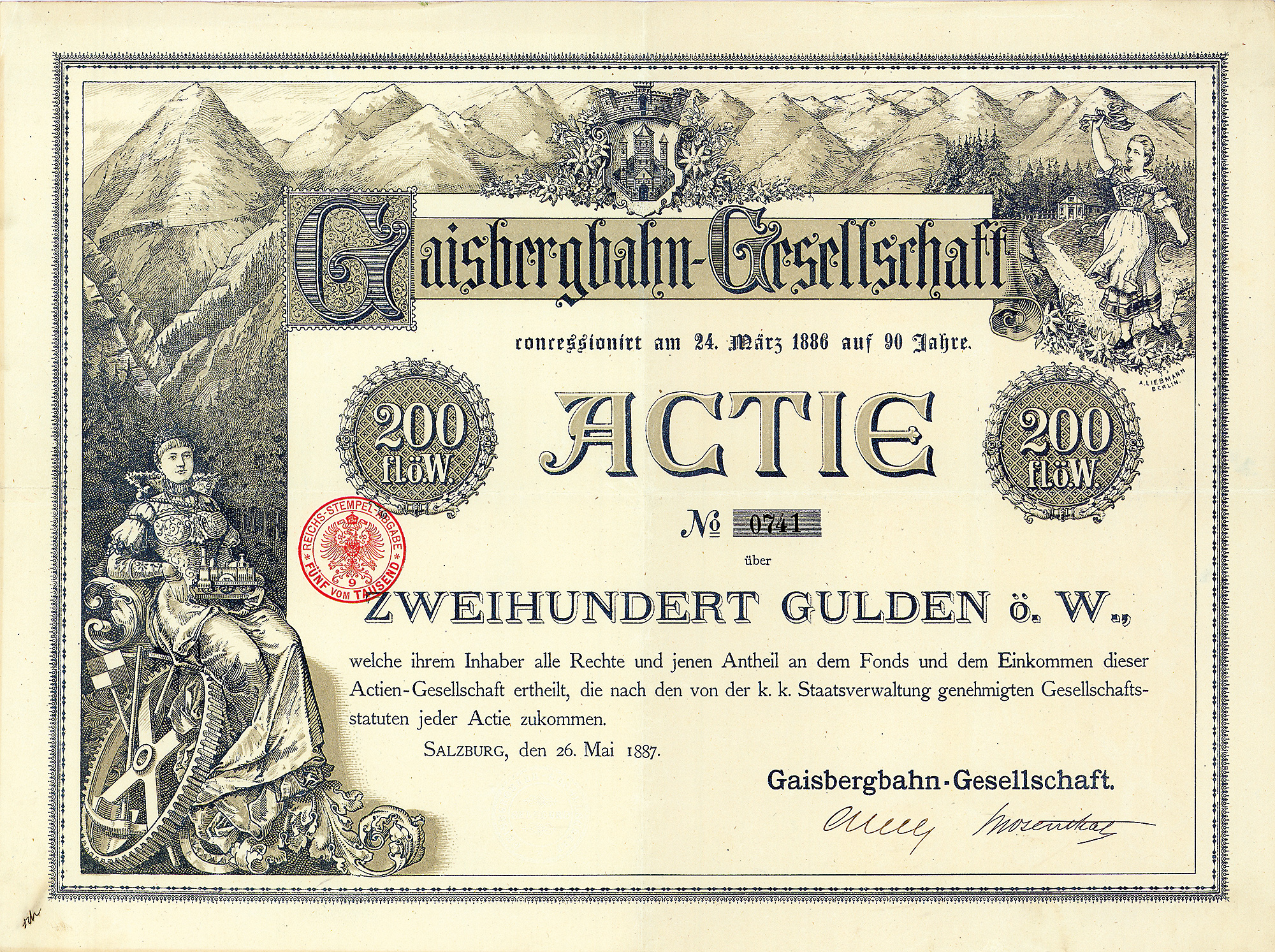
Share of the Gaisbergbahn-Gesellschaft, issued 26 May 1887

The Gaisberg has been a popular destination for daytrippers from Salzburg already in the 18th century. From 1887 until 1928 a rack railway, the Gaisbergbahn, provided easy access from the city to the top of the mountain until it was replaced in 1929 by a road. Today a public bus route starting from the Mirabellplatz square links a parking lot on the summit plateau, a starting point for winter sport, hiking, mountain biking, and paragliding to the city centre. The Gaisberg Transmitter, a 100 m (330 ft) high FM and TV transmitter facility located on its top, was erected in 1956.

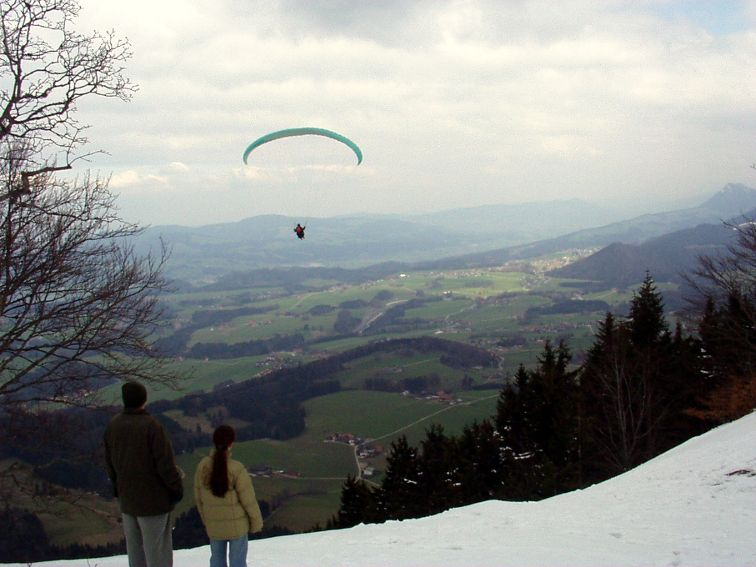
Paraglider flying eastwards from the top of the Gaisberg.

== Gaisberg race ==
The Gaisberg road became the venue of a car and motorcycle hillclimb race between 1929 and 1969, which was part of the European Hillclimb Championship.

Rudolf Caracciola, Manfred von Brauchitsch and Hans Stuck were among the 83 drivers of the first race on September 8, 1929 and contestants of later races included Luigi Fagioli, Carlo Felice Trossi, Wolfgang Graf Berghe von Trips, Jean Behra, Jochen Rindt, Rolf Stommelen and Niki Lauda.

Since 2003 the historical race has been revived and celebrated its 75th anniversary in 2004. .
