= Lermoos =

Municipality in Reutte, Tyrol, Austria

- Municipality
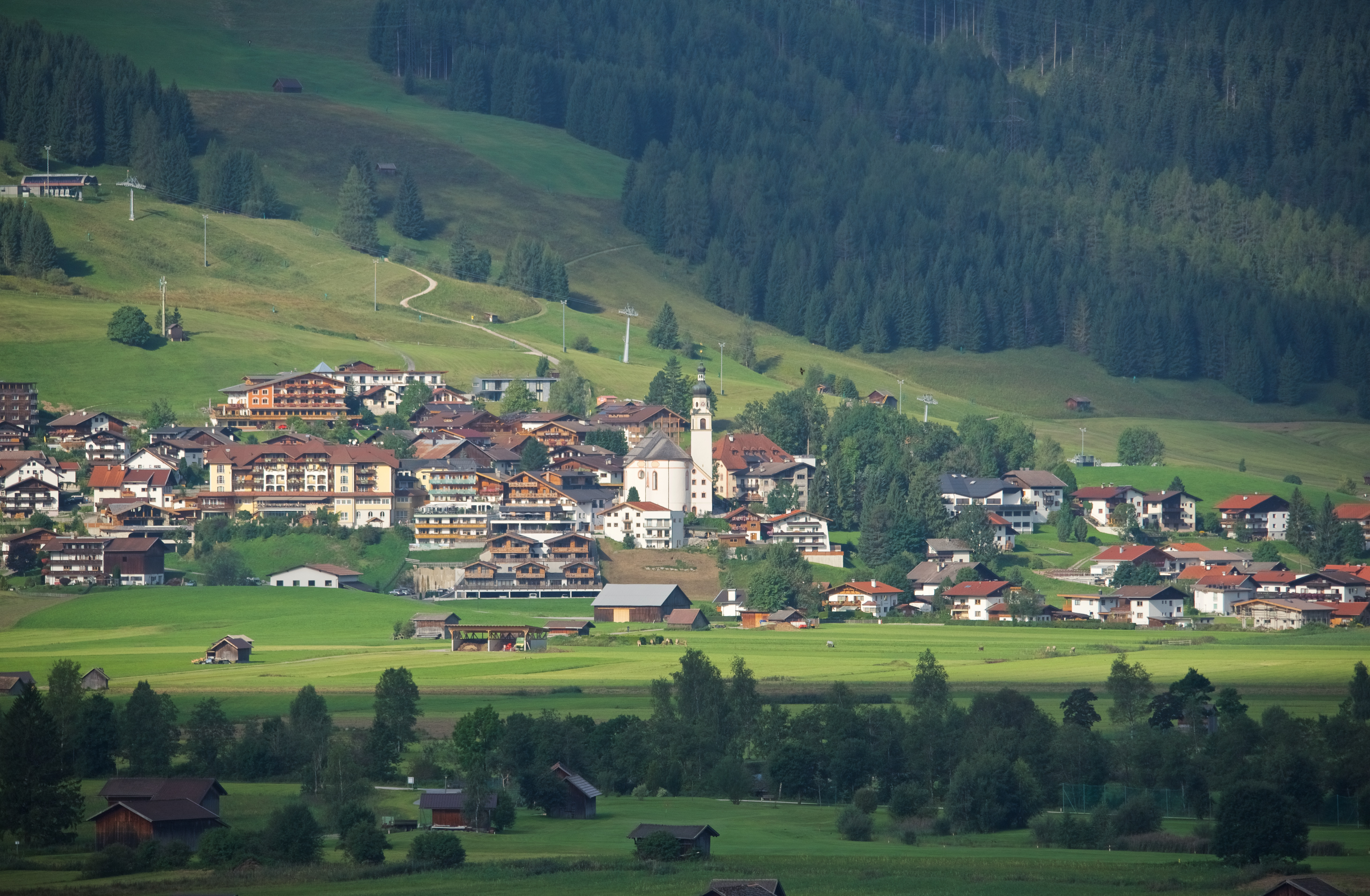

- Coat of arms

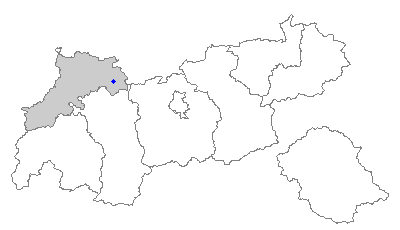
- Location of Lermoos within Tyrol

- Location within Austria
- Coordinates: 47°24′00″N 10°53′00″E
- Country: Austria
- State: Tyrol
- District: Reutte

Government
  - Mayor: Stefan Lagg

Area
  - Total: 56.45 km^{2} (21.80 sq mi)
- Elevation: 1,004 m (3,294 ft)

Population (2021)
  - Total: 1,138
  - Density: 20.16/km^{2} (52.21/sq mi)
- Time zone: UTC+1 (CET)
  - Summer (DST): UTC+2 (CEST)
- Postal code: 6631
- Area code: 05673
- Vehicle registration: RE
- Website: www.lermoos.tirol.gv.at

Lermoos is a municipality in the district of Reutte in the Austrian state of Tyrol.

It consists of two subdivisions: Unterdorf and Oberdorf.

Lermoos is most popular for its skiing and snowboarding in the winter and is very popular resort in the Zugspitze Arena. The town has many hotels. The village is set looking towards the Zugspitze (the highest mountain in Germany) and the Sonnenspitze. There is good public transport to Lermoos and buses for skiers running around the resorts. There is also a train station (DB Regio) to connect to larger towns e.g. Garmisch Partenkirchen and Reutte. Mentions of Lermoos date as far back as 1073—78, but may be older due to the presence of an ancient Roman road, the Via Claudia.
