= Kleinarl =

- Municipality
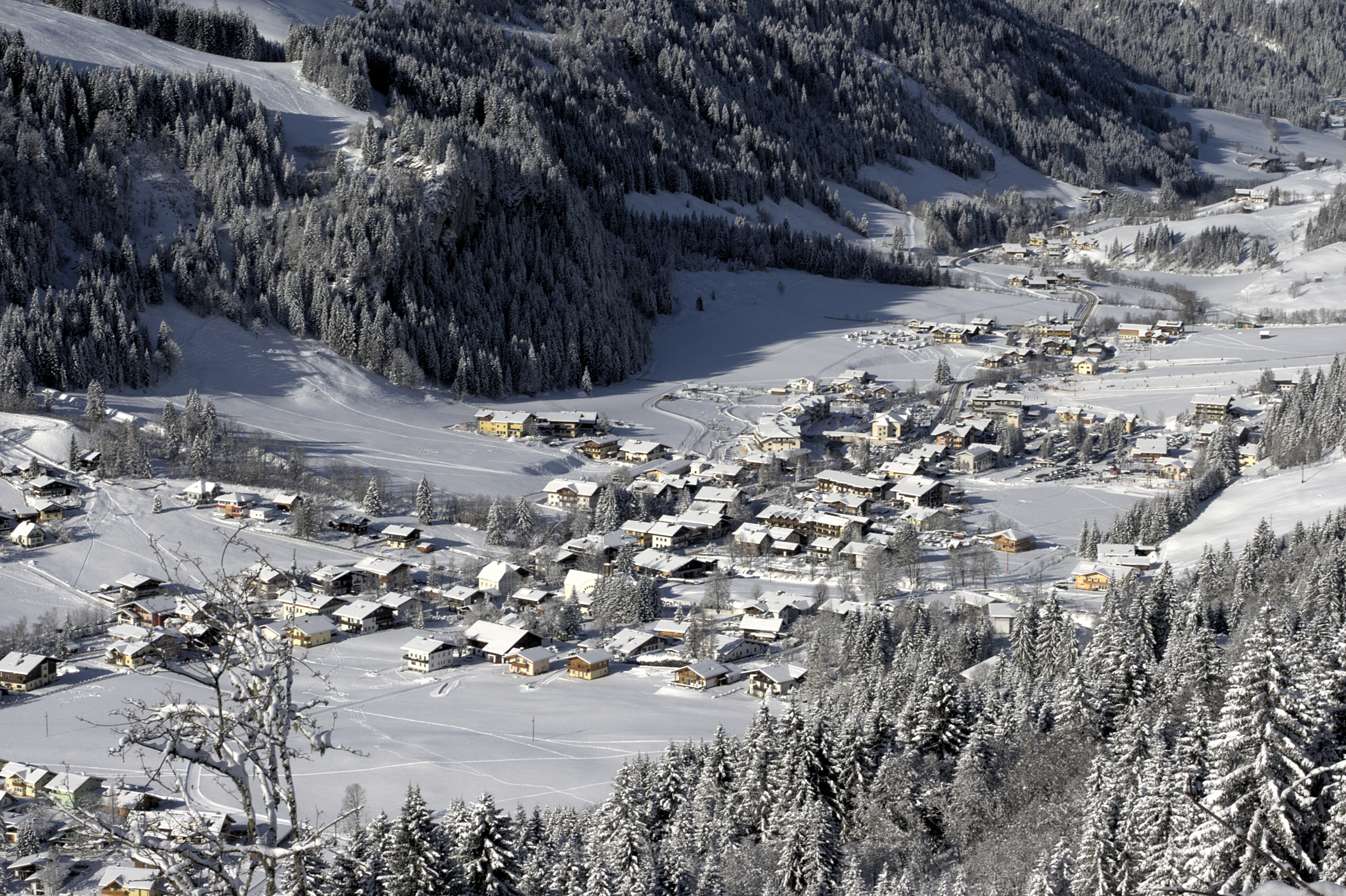
- Kleinarl in winter

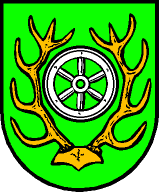
- Coat of arms

- Location within Austria
- Coordinates: 47°16′0″N 13°19′0″E
- Country: Austria
- State: Salzburg
- District: St. Johann im Pongau

Government
  - Mayor: Max Aichhorn (ÖVP)

Area
  - Total: 70.55 km^{2} (27.24 sq mi)
- Elevation: 1,014 m (3,327 ft)

Population (2018-01-01)
  - Total: 792
  - Density: 11.2/km^{2} (29.1/sq mi)
- Time zone: UTC+1 (CET)
  - Summer (DST): UTC+2 (CEST)
- Postal code: 5603
- Area code: 06418
- Vehicle registration: JO
- Website: www.kleinarl.at

Kleinarl is a municipality in the St. Johann im Pongau district in the Austrian state of Salzburg.

== Geography ==
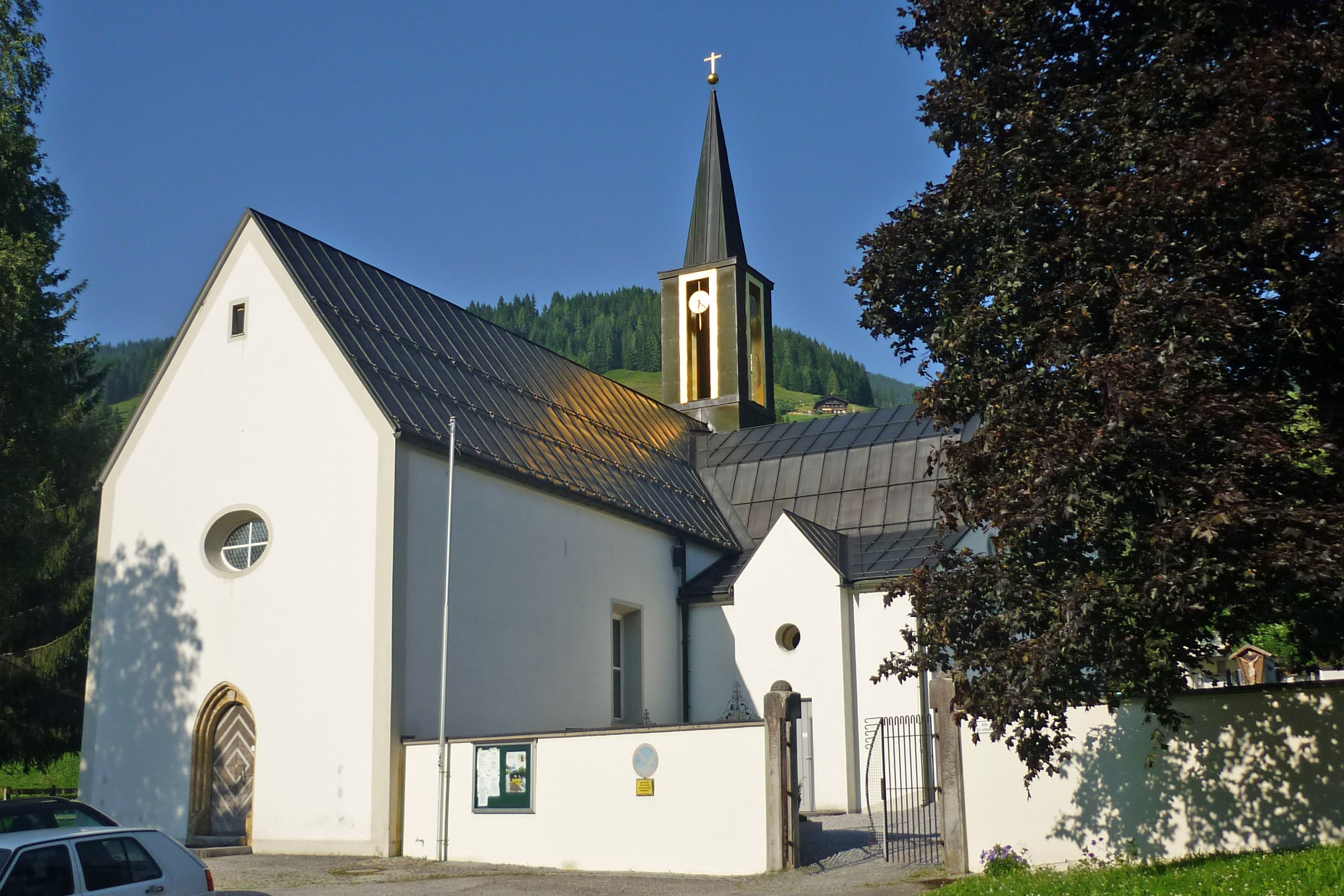
Parish church

The municipal area is located in the Pongau region within the Central Eastern Alps, on the northern rim of the High Tauern national park. The Radstadt Tauern mountain range with the source of the Enns river separates it from the Salzburg Lungau region. In the south, it borders on the market town of Wagrain.

The Flachauwinkl–Kleinarl ski area is part of the Ski Amadé network. The inhabitants mainly depend on winter tourism, but hiking and cycling in summer is also popular.

== History ==
The Gothic St. Lawrence parish church was consecrated in 1443. It was rebuilt from 1984 to 1986 according to plans by Heinz Tesar. The Prince-Archbishops of Salzburg had a hunting lodge erected at Kleinarl, which since the mid 18th century serves as a vicarage.

=== Population ===
Historical population
Year	Pop.	±%
1971	593	—
1981	651	+9.8%
1991	724	+11.2%
2001	743	+2.6%
2010	783	+5.4%

== Notable people ==
- Annemarie Moser-Pröll (born 1953), skier
- Cornelia Pröll (born 1961), skier.
