= John Pendry (hang glider pilot) =

British hang glider & paraglider pilot

John Malcolm Pendry (b. c. 1957) is a British hang glider and paraglider pilot. He was Hang Gliding World Champion in 1985 after winning the World Championship in Kössen, Austria. In 1997 he became the Paragliding World Champion after winning the World Championship in Castejon de Sos in the Spanish Pyrenees. He was the European Hang Gliding Champion in four consecutive competitions, in 1986, 1988, 1990 and 1992.

== Early life ==
Pendry grew up in Brighton, and started flying hang gliders whilst still a schoolboy aged 16 on the South Downs in Sussex, England. He graduated from University College Cardiff, Wales in 1980 with a civil engineering degree.

== Career ==
Pendry started competing with hang gliders in 1982, gaining second place and winning £2000 in a competition in Italy. From 1983 onwards he was sponsored by Planters Peanuts and set an official World Distance record of 186 miles in July 1983 in the Owens Valley, Nevada, USA. He also set a British distance record of 132 miles in 1984. From 1981 until 1995 he flew in many international solo and team hang gliding competitions around the world. In 1989, the British team, with Pendry leading, won the World Team Cup in Brazil; they retained it in 1991. He was considered one of the few hang gliding pilots to earn a reasonable income from the sport.

In 1987 he became the sales and marketing director of Airwave Gliders, the largest hang glider manufacturer in the world at the time based on the Isle of Wight. In 1991 he started competing in paragliding competitions in which he continued until 2000. He received two Royal Aero Club Gold Medals following his World titles in 1985 and 1987 presented respectively by Elizabeth II and Prince Andrew.

In 2000 he created the kitesurf school and shop, Adrenaline, in La Franqui close to Perpignan, France and ran this until 2015.

Pendry has two daughters, Alix born in 1991, and Charlotte, born in 1998.
