= Paragliding World Cup =

Cross country paraglider competition

Logo of the Paragliding World Cup

The Paragliding World Cup (or PWC for short) is a cross country flying competition for paraglider pilots, organized by the Paragliding World Cup Association (PWCA), based in Marlens, France. Each year, the Paragliding World Cup Tour visits 5-6 different locations worldwide. At each event several tasks are flown to establish the overall classification.

== History ==
This circuit was established in 1992 and is managed by the non-profit association Paragliding World Cup Association (PWCA) based in Marlens (France) whose members are the competitors themselves.

The goal of each competition task is to fly round a predetermined course with a start, some turn points (usually 4-6) and a finish line. Slightly simplified, the winner is the fastest pilot round the course, or the pilot who flew furthest if no one completes the course. Pilots carry a GPS receiver to record their flight track, which is afterwards used to verify that they correctly followed the course and determine timings.

Since 2009, there is one event at the end of every year called "PWC Superfinal". The best pilots selected from the events all over the year compete to select the overall winner of the year. Before 2009 the total winner was determined by adding the results of all worldcups of the year.

== Overall winners ==
1. 1992: Uli Wiesmeier (GER)
2. 1993: Richard Gallon (FRA)
3. 1994: Jimmy Pacher (ITA)
4. 1995: Hans Bollinger (CHE)
5. 1996: Christian Tamegger (AUT)
6. 1997: Jimmy Pacher (ITA)
7. 1998: Peter Lüthi (CHE)
8. 1999: Kari Eisenhut (CHE)
9. 2000: Andy Hediger (CHE)
10. 2001: Patrick Bérod (FRA)
11. 2002: Alex Hofer (CHE)
12. 2003: Achim Joos (GER)
13. 2004: Oliver Rössel (GER)
14. 2005: Christian Maurer (CHE)
15. 2006: Christian Maurer (CHE)
16. 2007: Christian Maurer (CHE)
17. 2008: Andy Aebi (CHE)
18. 2009: Charles Cazaux (FRA)
19. 2010: Yann Martail (FRA)
20. 2011: Peter Neuenschwander (CHE)
21. 2012: Aaron Durogati (ITA)
22. 2013: Francisco Javier Reina Lagos (ESP)
23. 2014: Maxime Pinot (FRA)
24. 2015: Stefan Wyss (CHE)
25. 2016: Aaron Durogati (ITA)
26. 2017: Michael Sigel (CHE)
27. 2018: Pierre Remy (FRA)
28. 2021: Luc Armant (FRA)
29. 2022: Honorin Hamard (FRA)
30. 2023: Honorin Hamard (FRA)
31. 2024: Maxime Pinot (FRA)
32. 2025: Andy Tallia (FRA)

== Host locations for 2027 ==
Host site	Dates	Winner	Second	Third
Pedro Bernardo (ESP)	Jun 19th - Jun 26th			
Targasonne (FRA)	Jul 3rd - Jul 10th			
Siatista (GRE)	Aug 28th - Sep 4th			
TBD				
TBD				
2027 Superfinal
TBD				

== Host locations for 2026 ==
Host site	Dates	Winner	Second	Third
Gemona (ITA)	Jul 25th - Aug 1st	Baptiste Lambert (FRA); Alexia Fischer (USA)	Martin Jovanoski (MKD); Elisa Deutschmann (DEU)	Roger Aeschbacher (CHE); Violeta Jimenez (USA)
Sopot (BUL)	Sep 5th - Sep 12th	Stanislav Klikar (CZE); Keiko Hiraki (JPN)	Honorin Hamard (FRA); Tomoko Yoshikawa (JPN)	Selever Bogdan Tudor (ROM) -
Baixo Guandu (BRA)	Oct 3rd - Oct 10th	Andy Aebi (CHE); Violeta Jimenez (USA)	Claudio Matos (BRA); Lynsey Haynes (CAN)	Erico Oliveira (BRA); Pamela Diez (MEX)
Panchgani (IND)	Feb 14th - Feb 21st, 2027			
Pegalajar (ESP)	Apr 17th - Apr 24th, 2027			
2026 Superfinal
Grindelwald - Interlaken (CHE)	May 4th - May 15th, 2027			

== Winners for 2025 ==
Host site	Dates	Winner	Second	Third
Algodonales (ESP)	May 10th - May 17th	Andy Tallia (FRA); Alexia Fischer (USA)	Baptiste Lambert (FRA); Constance Mettetal (FRA)	Petr Kostrhun (CZE); Violeta Jimenez (USA)
Linzhou (CHN)	June 7th - June 14th	Tilen Ceglar (SLO); Galen Kirkpatrick (USA)	Honorin Hamard (FRA); Jenny O'Neil (USA)	Mike Lester (USA); Jinhee Baek (KOR)
Feltre (ITA)	June 28th - July 5th	Baptiste Lambert (FRA); Sarah Zimmermann (CHE)	Juan Ospina (GBR); Johanna Hamne (SWE)	Tilen Ceglar (SLO); Joanna Kocot (POL)
Kruševo (MAK)	July 20th - July 27th	Jouni Makkonen (FIN); Daphnée Ieropoli (FRA)	Honorin Hamard (FRA); Alexia Fischer (USA)	Martin Jovanoski (MKD); Violeta Jimenez (USA)
Aksaray (TUR)	Aug 16th - Aug 23rd	Sergio Sampaio (BRA) - -	Kevin Philipp (CHE) - -	Gleb Sukhotskiy (KAZ) - -
Panchgani (IND)	Feb 14th - Feb 21st, 2026	Michael Sigel (CHE); Silvia Buzzi Ferraris (ITA)	Manuel Laly (FRA); Jun Yomo (JAP)	Mario Monteiro (BRA); Olga Plotnikova (KAZ)
Governador Valadares (BRA)	Apr 19th - Apr 26th, 2026	Baptiste Lambert (FRA); Violeta Jimenez (USA)	Roger Aeschbacher (CHE); Marcella Uchoa (BRA)	Arthur Moindrot (FRA); Pamela Diez (MEX)
2025 Superfinal
Pegalajar (ESP)	May 12th - May 23rd, 2026	Andy Tallia (FRA); Constance Mettetal (FRA)	Baptiste Lambert (FRA); Alexia Fischer (USA)	Pierre Remy (FRA); Daphnée Ieropoli (FRA)

== Winners for 2024 ==
Host site	Winner	Second	Third
Interlaken (CHE)	Julien Wirtz (FRA); Violeta Jimenez (USA)	Juan Ospina (GBR); Alexia Fischer (USA)	Chrigel Maurer (CHE); Jenny O’Neil (USA)
El Yelmo (ESP)	Honorin Hamard (FRA); Capucine Deliot (FRA)	Russel Ogden (GBR); Marcella Uchoa (BRA)	Dylan Mansley (GBR) - -
Çameli (TUR)	Martin Jovanoski (MKD); Violeta Jimenez (USA)	Violeta Jimenez (USA); Katalin Juhasz (HUN)	Nicholas Greece (USA); Silvia Buzzi Ferraris (ITA)
Gourdon (FRA)	Julien Wirtz (FRA); Elisabeth Egger (AUT)	Baptiste Lambert (FRA); Keiko Hiraki (JPN)	Luc Armant (FRA); XiaoYa Xie (CHN)
Monroe (USA)	Baptiste Lambert (FRA); Violeta Jimenez (USA)	Evan Bouchier (USA); Alexia Fischer (USA)	Colin Rathbun (BVI); Jun Yomo (JAP)
2024 Superfinal
Roldanillo (COL)	Maxime Pinot (FRA); Constance Mettetal (FRA)	Juan Ospina (GBR); Keiko Hiraki (JAP)	Thibault Voglet (BEL); Alexia Fischer (USA)

== Winners for 2023 ==
Host site	Winner	Second	Third
Castelo (BRA)	Honorin Hamard (FRA); Méryl Delferrière (FRA)	Baptiste Lambert (FRA); Nanda Walliser (SWI)	Alexander Schalber (AUT); Violeta Jimenez (USA)
Pegalajar (ESP)	Baptiste Lambert (FRA); Violeta Jimenez (USA)	Andy Tallia (FRA) Kari Ellis (AUS)	Pierre Remy (FRA) Atsuko Yamashita (JAP)
Sacele-Brasov (ROM)	Andrei Gaia (ROM); Jinhee Baek (KOR)	Nicolas Dinh (FRA); Tomoko Yoshikawa (JAP)	Ivan Centa (ITA) Capucine Deliot (FRA)
Aksaray (TUR)	Stan Radzikowski (GBR); Alexia Fischer (USA)	Ferdinand Vogel (DEU); Jenny O’Neil (USA)	Petr Kostrhun (CZE); Silvia Buzzi Ferraris (ITA)
Targasonne (FRA)	Maxime Pinot (FRA); Violeta Jimenez (USA)	Honorin Hamard (FRA); Alexia Fischer (USA)	Baptiste Lambert (FRA); Constance Mettetal (FRA)
Pico do Gaviao (BRA)	Estefano Salgado (MEX); Johanna Hamne (SWE)	Manuel Quintanilla (MEX); Maria Alejandra Mejia (COL)	Vladimir Bacanin (SER); Khobi-Jane Bowden (RSA)
2023 Superfinal
Baixo Guandu (BRA)	Honorin Hamard (FRA); Méryl Delferrière (FRA)	Baptiste Lambert (FRA); Alexia Fischer (USA)	Joachim Oberhauser (ITA); Constance Mettetal (FRA)

== Winners for 2022 ==
Host site	Winner	Second	Third
Aksaray (TUR)	Martin Jovanoski (MKD); Galen Kirkpatrick (USA)	Gleb Sukhotskiy (RUS); Violeta Jimenez (USA)	Stephane Drouin (FRA); Daria Krasnova (RUS)
La Rioja (ARG)	François Cormier (FRA); Violeta Jimenez (USA)	Giuliano Minutella (ITA); Evgeniya Belova (RUS)	Gleb Sukhotskiy (RUS); Junghun Park (KOR)
Roldanillo (COL)	Honorin Hamard (FRA); Méryl Delferrière (FRA)	Méryl Delferrière (FRA); Yael Margelisch (CHE)	Baptiste Lambert (FRA); Elisabeth Egger (AUT)
Baixo Guandu (BRA)	Dominik Breitinger (CHE); Méryl Delferrière (FRA)	Manuel Quintanilla (MEX); Galen Kirkpatrick (USA)	Michael Sigel (CHE); Marcella Uchoa (BRA)
Clopotiva (ROM)	Joachim Oberhauser (ITA); Constance Mettetal (FRA)	Justin Puthod (FRA); Keiko Hiraki (JAP)	Darko Stankovski (MKD); Marcella Uchoa (BRA)
Kruševo (MKD)	Babtiste Lambert (FRA); Constance Mettetal (FRA)	Charles Cazaux (FRA); Keiko Hiraki (JAP)	Daniel Tyrkas (DEU); Christie Cameron (GBR)
Gochang (DPK)	Martin Jovanoski (MKD); Violeta Jimenez (USA)	Jan Jares (CZE); Hyunhee Kim (KOR)	Seyong Jung (KOR); Galen Kirkpatrick (USA)
2022 Superfinal
Valle de Bravo (MEX)	Honorin Hamard (FRA); Constance Mettetal (FRA)	Philipp Haag (DEU); Keiko Hiraki (JAP)	Baptiste Lambert (FRA); Yael Margelisch (CHE)

== Winners for 2021 ==
Host site	Winner	Second	Third
Gemona (ITA)	Jonathan Marin (FRA); Seiko Fukuoka (FRA)	Ulrich Prinz (DEU); Nanda Walliser (CHE)	Simon Mettetal (FRA); Constance Mettetal (FRA)
Kopaonik (SER)	Simon Mettetal (FRA); Marcella UCHOA (BRA)	Julien Wirtz (FRA); Meryl Delferriere (FRA)	Honorin Hamard (FRA); Constance Mettetal (FRA)
2021 Superfinal
Disentis (CHE)	Luc Armant (FRA); Seiko Fukuoka (FRA)	Aaron Durogati (ITA); Méryl Delferrière (FRA)	Adrian Hachen (CHE); Nanda Walliser (CHE)

== Winners for 2020 ==
Host site	Winner	Second	Third
Disentis (CHE)	Stephan Morgenthaler (CHE); Seiko Fukuoka (FRA)	Luc Armant (FRA); Yael Margelisch (CHE)	Charles Cazaux (FRA); Laurie Genovese (FRA)
Note on 2020 season
Due to the COVID-19 pandemic, the rest of the events planned for 2020 were cancelled, including the Superfinal.

== Winners for 2019 ==
Host site	Winner	Second	Third
Coeur de Savoie (FRA)	Charles Cazaux (FRA); Méryl Delferrière (FRA)	Stephan Morgenthaler (CHE); Seiko Fukuoka (FRA)	Tilen Ceglar (SLO); Keiko Hiraki (JAP)
Linzhou (CHN)	Baptiste Lambert (FRA); Méryl Delferrière (FRA)	Michael Küffer (CHE); Daria Krasnova (RUS)	Evan Bouchier (USA); Constance Mettetal (FRA)
Manteigas (POR)	Honorin Hamard (FRA); Constance Mettetal (FRA)	Pierre Remy (FRA); Silvia Buzzi Ferraris (ITA)	Franck Perring (FRA); Atsuko Yamashita (JAP)
Pico do Gaviao (BRA)	Baptiste Lambert (FRA); Marcella Uchoa (BRA)	Yoshiaki Hirokawa (JAP); Yael Margelisch (CHE)	Maxime Pinot (FRA); Emma Casanova (GBR)
Loma Bola (ARG)	Jurij Vidic (SLO); Adél Honti (HUN)	Xavier Laporte (FRA); Marcella Uchoa (BRA)	Pál Takáts (HUN); Shauin Kao (ARG)
2019 Superfinal
Castelo (BRA)	Originally scheduled to start on March 24th, 2020, the 2019 superfinal was cancelled due to the COVID-19 pandemic.		

== Winners for 2018 ==
Host site	Winner	Second	Third
Bright (AUS)	Honorin Hamard (FRA); Méryl Delferrière (FRA)	Maxime Bellemin (FRA); Midori Nakanome (JAP)	Cody Mittanck (USA); Woo Young Jang (KOR)
Baixo Guandu (BRA)	Michael Küffer (CHE); Méryl Delferrière (FRA)	Stephane Poulain (FRA); Keiko Hiraki (JAP)	Torsten Siegel (DEU); Yael Margelisch (CHE)
Gemona del Friuli (ITA)	Jurij Vidic (SLO); Seiko Fukuoka (FRA)	Torsten Siegel (DEU); Yael Margelisch (CHE)	Jonathan Marin (FRA); Méryl Delferrière (FRA)
Sopot (BUL)	Gleb Sukhotskiy (RUS); Méryl Delferrière (FRA)	Jurij Vidic (SLO); Yuki Sato (JAP)	Rafael De Moraes Barros (BRA); Klaudia Bułgakow (POL)
Aksaray (TUR)	Russell Achterberg (RSA); Seiko Fukuoka (FRA)	Yassen Savov (BUL); Yael Margelisch (CHE)	Stephane Poulain (FRA); Daria Krasnova (RUS)
2018 Superfinal
Baixo Guandu (BRA)	Pierre Remy (FRA); Méryl Delferrière (FRA)	Julien Wirtz (FRA); Yael Margelisch (CHE)	Russel Ogden (GBR); Kari Ellis (AUS)

== Winners for 2017 ==
Host site	Winner	Second	Third
Coeur de Savoie (FRA)	Luc Armant (FRA); Méryl Delferrière (FRA)	Julien Wirtz (FRA); Seiko Fukuoka (FRA)	Ulrich Prinz (DEU); Laurie Genovese (FRA)
Niš (SER)	Stephane Drouin (FRA); Atsuko Yamashita (JAP)	Yassen Savov (BUL); Yuki Sato (JAP)	Arnaud Baumy (FRA); Méryl Delferrière (FRA)
Disentis (CHE)	Alfredo Studer (CHE); Seiko Fukuoka (FRA)	Dominik Breitinger (CHE); Emanuelle Zufferey (CHE)	Christoph Trutmann (CHE); Yael Margelisch (CHE)
Pico do Gaviao (BRA)	Rafael Saladini (BRA); Silvia Buzzi Ferraris (ITA)	Erico Oliveira (BRA); Merve Gülsah Arslan (TUR)	Frank Brown (BRA); Marcella Pomarico Uchoa (BRA)
Guayaquil - Bototillo (ECU)	Honorin Hamard (FRA); Yael Margelisch (CHE)	Stefan Wyss (CHE); Keiko Hiraki (JAP)	Zoran Labovic (NOR); Benedicte Saury-Jourdain (FRA)
2017 Superfinal
Roldanillo (COL)	Michael Sigel (CHE); Laurie Genovese (FRA)	Nicola Donini (ITA); Méryl Delferrière (FRA)	Joachim Oberhauser (ITA); Klaudia Bułgakow (POL)

== Winners for 2016 ==
Host site	Winner	Second	Third
Castelo (BRA)	Félix Rodriguez (ESP); Keiko Hiraki (JAP)	Lucas Bernardin (FRA); Nicole Fedele (ITA)	Frank Brown (BRA); Klaudia Bułgakow (POL)
Gemona del Friuli (ITA)	Andreas Malecki (DEU); Silvia Buzzi Ferraris (ITA)	Jurij Vidic (SLO); Seiko Fukuoka (FRA)	Hernán Pitocco (ARG); Yvonne Dathe (DEU)
Serra da Estrela (POR)	Donizete B. Lemos (BRA); Keiko Hiraki (JAP)	Claudio Virgilio (POR); Yael Margelisch (CHE)	José Luis Sudbrack Guimaraes (BRA); Shauin Kao (ARG)
Saint-André-les-Alpes (FRA)	Maxime Pinot (FRA); Kirsty Cameron (GBR)	Félix Rodriguez (ESP); Laurie Genovese (FRA)	Luc Armant (FRA); Yael Margelisch (CHE)
Saint-Leu (FRA)	Michael Küffer (CHE); Klaudia Bułgakow (POL)	Simon Pellissier (FRA); Benedicte Saury-Jourdain (FRA)	Andre Rainsford-Alberts (RSA); Méryl Delferrière (FRA)
2016 Superfinal
Governador Valadares (BRA)	Aaron Durogati (ITA); Seiko Fukuoka (FRA)	Adrian Hachen (CHE); Nicole Fedele (ITA)	Charles Cazaux (FRA); Laurie Genovese (FRA)

== Winners for 2015 ==
Host site	Winner	Second	Third
Baixo Guandu (BRA)	Marco Littame (ITA); Klaudia Bulgakow (POL)	Ally Palencia (VEN); Yayoi Ito (JPN)	Urs Schoenauer (CHE); Nao Takada (JPN)
Montalegre (POR)	Honorin Hamard (FRA); Keiko Hiraki (JPN)	Julien Wirtz (FRA); Klaudia Bulgakow (POL)	Yoshiki Kuremoto (JPN); Silvia Buzzi Ferraris (ITA)
Disentis (CHE)	Christian Maurer (CHE); Seiko Fukuoka (FRA)	Stefan Wyss (CHE); Emanuelle Zufferey (CHE)	Michael Küffer (CHE); Yael Margelisch (CHE)
Ager (ESP)	Pierre Remy (FRA); Seiko Fukuoka (FRA)	Xevi Bonet Dalmau (ESP); Keiko Hiraki (JPN)	Helmut Eichholzer (AUT); Atsuko Yamashita (JPN)
Bir (IND)	Michael Küffer (CHE); Yuki Sato (JPN)	Xevi Bonet Dalmau (ESP); Petra Slivova (CZE)	Julien Wirtz (FRA); Yael Margelisch (CHE)
2015 Superfinal
Valle de Bravo (MEX)	Stephan Wyss (CHE); Seiko Fukuoka (FRA)	Julien Wirtz (FRA); Laurie Genovese (FRA)	Luca Donini (ITA); Keiko Hiraki (JPN)

== Winners for 2014 ==
Host site	Winner	Second	Third
Valle de Bravo (MEX)	Michael Maurer (CHE); Seiko Fukuoka (FRA)	Pierre Remy (FRA); Tomoko Uno (JPN)	Stefan Wyss (CHE); Andrea Jaramillo (COL)
Mina Clavero (ARG)	Richard Pethigal (BRA); Tomoko Uno (JPN)	Jacques Fournier (FRA); Nicole Fedele (ITA)	Jared Anderson (USA); Laurie Genovese (FRA)
Coeur de Savoie (FRA)	Félix Rodriguez (ESP); Kirsty Cameron (GBR)	Alfredo Studer (CHE); Laurie Genovese (FRA)	Clement Latour (FRA); Tomoko Uno (JPN)
Celorico de Beira (POR)	Félix Rodriguez (ESP); Emi Hirokawa (JPN)	Julien Wirtz (FRA); Ayse Bayrak (TUR)	Andreas Malecki (GER); Yvonne Dathe (GER)
Krushevo (MKD)	Stephan Morgenthaler (CHE); Nicole Fedele (ITA)	Yassen Savow (BUL); Keiko Hiraki (JPN)	Stephan Gruber (AUT); Tomoko Uno (JPN)
2014 Superfinal
Denizli (TUR)	Maxime Pinot (FRA); Laurie Genovese (FRA)	Honorin Hamard (FRA); Keiko Hiraki (JPN)	Julien Wirtz (FRA); Yuki Sato (JPN)

== Winners for 2013 ==
Host site	Winner	Second	Third
Porterville (RSA)	Andre Rainsford-Alberts (RSA); Keiko Hiraki (JPN)	Félix Rodriguez (ESP); Nicole Fedele (ITA)	Washington Peruchi (BRA); Kirsty Cameron (GBR)
Baixo Guandu (BRA)	Michael Sigel (CHE); Seiko Fukuoka (FRA)	Adrian Hachen (CHE); Ayse Bayrak (TUR)	Julien Wirtz (FRA); Elisa Houdry (FRA)
Val Louron (FRA)	Richard Gallon (FRA); Laurie Genovese (FRA)	Ulrich Prinz (GER); Seiko Fukuoka Naville (FRA)	Xevi Bonet Dalmau (ESP); Klaudia Bulgakow (POL)
Raska-Kopaonik (SRB)	Maxime Bellemin (FRA); Klaudia Bulgakow (POL)	Francisco Javier Reina Lagos (ESP); Marina Olexina (RUS)	Charles Cazaux (FRA); Daria Krasnova (RUS)
Erzincan (TUR)	Manuel Nübel (GER); Daria Krasnova (RUS)	Julien Wirtz (FRA); Renata Kuhnova (CZE)	Alexander Schalber (AUT); Yvonne Dathe (GER)
2013 Superfinal
Governador Valadares (BRA)	Francisco Javier Reina Lagos (ESP); Keiko Hiraki (JPN)	Joachim Oberhauser (ITA); Seiko Fukuoka (FRA)	Stephane Drouin (FRA); Nicole Fedele (ITA)

== Winners for 2012 ==
Host site	Winner	Second	Third
Castelo (BRA)	Yann Martail (FRA); Emanuelle Zufferey (CHE)	Michael Sigel (CHE); Marina Olexina (RUS)	Carlos Cordido (VEN); Svetlana Piskareva (RUS)
Talloires (FRA)	Alfredo Studer (CHE); Seiko Fukuoka (FRA)	Joel Debons (CHE); Laurie Genovese (FRA)	Charles Cazaux (FRA); Keiko Hiraki (JPN)
Montalegre (POR)	Yann Martail (FRA); Keiko Hiraki (JPN)	Marco Littame (ITA); Tomomi Masuko (JPN)	Helmut Eichholzer (AUT); Ayse Bayrak (TUR)
Krushevo (MKD)	Olivier Michielsen (FRA); Klaudia Bulgakow (POL)	Armin Eder (AUT); Ayse Bayrak (TUR)	Charles Cazaux (FRA); Joanna Di Grigoli (VEN)
Sun Valley (US)	Mark Watts (GBR); Regula Strasser (CHE)	Andre Rainsford-Alberts (RSA); Yayoi Ito (JPN)	Kiyoshi Nariyama (JPN); Andrea Jaramillo Jaramillo (COL)
2012 Superfinal
Roldanillo (COL)	Aaron Durogati (ITA); Nicole Fedele (ITA)	Michael Maurer (CHE); Laurie Genovese (FRA)	Rusell Ogden (GBR); Keiko Hiraki (JPN)

== Winners for 2011 ==
Host site	Winner	Second	Third
Roldanillo (COL)	Michael Sigel (CHE); Renata Kuhnova (CZE)	Russell Ogden (GBR); Elisa Houdry (FRA)	Peter Neuenschwander (CHE); Keiko Hiraki (JPN)
Mun Gyeong (KOR)	Jack Brown (USA); Daria Krasnova (RUS)	Jimmy Pacher (ITA); Elisa Houdry (FRA)	Lucas Bernardin (FRA); Marina Olexina (RUS)
Lienz (AUT)|	Alex Hofer (CHE); Regula Strasser (CHE)	Josef Brandner (AUT); Elisa Houdry (FRA)	Jacques Fournier (FRA); Seiko Fukuoka (FRA)
Bayramoren (TUR)	Stephane Drouin (FRA); Seiko Fukuoka (FRA)	Raul Penso Hernandez (COL); Petra Slivova (CZE)	Marc Wensauer (GER); Renata Kuhnova (CZE)
Ager (ESP)	Jeremie Lager (FRA); Seiko Fukuoka (FRA)	Stephan Morgenthaler (CHE); Kirsty Cameron (GBR)	Xevi Bonet Dalmau (ESP); Petra Slivova (CZE)
2011 Superfinal
Valle de Bravo (MEX)	Peter Neuenschwander (CHE); Petra Slivova (CZE)	Jean-Marc Caron (FRA); Seiko Fukuoka (FRA)	Dusan Oroz (SLO); Regula Strasser (CHE)

== Winners for 2010 ==
Host site	Winner	Second	Third
Poços de Caldas (BRA)	Urban Valic (SLO); Elisa Houdry (FRA)	Russell Achterberg (RSA); Orlane Sturbois (FRA)	Aljaz Valic (SLO); Kamira Pereira (BRA)
Happo (JPN)	Lucas Bernardin (FRA); Tomomi Masuko (JPN)	Kaoru Ogisawa (JPN); Noriko MIzunuma (JPN)	Yasushi Kobayashi (JPN); Junghun Park (KOR)
Linzhou (CHN)	Andrey Eliseev (RUS); Orlane Sturbois (FRA)	Alex Hofer (CHE); Christine Metais (FRA)	Yasushi Kobayashi (JPN); Xiangping Hou (CHN)
Drama (GRE)	Thomas Brandlehner (AUT); Seiko Fukuoka (FRA)	Jamie Messenger (GBR); Keiko Hiraki (JPN)	Luc Armant (FRA); Renata Kuhnova (CZE)
San Potito (ITA)	Luc Armant (FRA); Renata Kuhnova (CZE)	Aljaz Valic (SLO); Seiko Fukuoka (FRA)	Andreas Malecki (GER); Regula Strasser (CHE)
Chelan (USA)	Josh Cohn (USA); Joanna Di Grigoli (VEN)	Nicholas Greece (USA); Melanie Pfister (USA)	Yasushi Kobayashi (JPN); Nicole Mclearn (CAN)
Serra de Estrela (POR)	Lucas Bernardin (FRA); Seiko Fukuoka (FRA)	Claudio Virgillo (POR); Katarzyna Gruziewska-Losik (POL)	Julien Wirtz (FRA); Marina Olexina (RUS)
2010 Superfinal
Denizli (TUR)	Yann Martail (FRA); Petra Slivova (CZE)	Jurij Vidic (SLO); Seiko Fukuoka (FRA)	Jean-Marc Caron (FRA); Elisa Houdry (FRA)

== Winners for 2009 ==
Host site	Winner	Second	Third
Governador Valadares (BRA)	Raul Penso Henandez (VEN); Elisa Houdry (FRA)	Andreas Malecki (GER); Marina Olexina (RUS)	Stefan Wyss (CHE); Svetlana Piskareva (RUS)
Mun Gyeong (KOR)	Seyong Jung (KOR); Orlane Sturbois (FRA)	Denis Cortella (FRA); Noriko MIzunuma (JPN)	David Ohlidal (CZE); Xiangping Hou (CHN)
Denizli (TUR)	Russell Ogden (GBR); Elisa Houdry (FRA)	Jean-Marc Caron (FRA); Marina Olexina (RUS)	Yassen Savov (BUL); Renata Kuhnova (CZE)
Talloires (FRA)	Stefan Wyss (CHE); Elisa Houdry (FRA)	Aljaz Valic (SLO); Keiko Hiraki (JPN)	Peter Frauenschuh (CHE); Seiko Fukuoka Naville (JPN)
Buzet (CRO)	Yassen Savov (BUL); Renata Kuhnova (CZE)	Armin Eder (AUT); Marion Slunka (AUT)	Stefan Wyss (CHE); Elisa Houdry (FRA)
2009 Superfinal
Poggio Bustone (ITA)	Charles Cazaux (FRA); Keiko Hiraki (JPN)	Russell Ogden (GBR); Elisa Houdry (FRA)	Luca Donini (ITA); Petra Slivova (CZE)

== Winners for 2008 ==
Host site		Winner	Second	Third
Poggio Bustone (ITA)	:	Urban Valic (SLO); Renata Kuhnova (CZE)	Primoz Podobnik (SLO); Keiko Hiraki (JPN)	Stefan Schmoker (CHE); Anja Kroll (CHE)
Grindelwald (CHE)	:	Chrigel Maurer (CHE); Anja Kroll (CHE)	Peter Frauenschuh (AUT); Dorothea Stichlmair (GER)	Michael von Wachter (VEN); Keiko Hiraki (JPN)
Castejon de Sos (ESP)	:	Karlo Bonacic (CRO); Ewa Wisnierska (GER)	Jean Marc Caron (FRA); Anja Kroll (CHE)	Tomas Brauner (CZE); Elisa Houdry (FRA)
Sopot (BUL)	:	Helmut Eichholzer (AUT); Klaudia Bulgakow (POL)	Tomas Brauner (CZE); Anja Kroll (CHE)	Jean Marc Caron (FRA); Ewa Wisnierska (GER)
Castelo (BRA)	:	Stefan Schmoker (CHE); Ewa Wisnierska (GER)	Tomas Brauner (CZE); Elisa Houdry (FRA)	Urban Valic (SLO); Anja Kroll (CHE)
Total:		Andy Aebi (CHE); Anja Kroll (CHE)	Jean Marc Caron (FRA); Ewa Wisnierska (GER)	Stefan Schmoker (CHE); Keiko Hiraki (JPN)

== Winners for 2007 ==
Host site		Winner	Second	Third
Ibaraki (JPN)	:	Primoz Podobnik (SLO); Keiko Hiraki (JPN)	Urban Valic (SLO); Anja Kroll (CHE)	David Ohlidal (CZE); Yasuko Murakami (JPN)
Àger (ESP)	:	Chrigel Maurer (CHE); Eliane Ueltschi (CHE)	Jean Marc Caron (FRA); Elisa Houdry (FRA)	Stefan Schmoker (CHE); Hana Matyaskova (CZE)
Cornizzolo (ITA)	:	Chrigel Maurer (CHE); Anja Kroll (CHE)	Andy Aebi (CHE); Ewa Wisnierska (GER)	Christian Tamegger (AUT); Keiko Hiraki (JPN)
Kayseri (TUR)	:	Urban Valic (SLO); Anja Kroll (CHE)	Aljaz Valic (SLO); Ewa Wisnierska (GER)	Stefan Wyss (CHE); Klaudia Bulgakow (POL)
Tucuman (ARG)	:	Urban Valic (SLO); Klaudia Bulgakow (POL)	Stefan Wyss (CHE); Ewa Wisnierska (GER)	Aljaz Valic (SLO); Keiko Hiraki (JPN)
Total:		Chrigel Maurer (CHE); Anja Kroll (CHE)	Urban Valic (SLO); Ewa Wisnierska (GER)	Andy Aebi (CHE); Keiko Hiraki (JPN)

== Winners for 2006 ==
Host site		Winner	Second	Third
Castelo (BRA)	:	Chrigel Maurer (CHE); Ewa Wisnierska Cieslewicz (GER)	Tomas Brauner (CZE); Karin Appenzeller (CHE)	Martin Orlik (CZE); Noriko Mizunuma (JPN)
Seeboden (AUT)	:	Gregory Blondeau (FRA); Ewa Wisnierska Cieslewicz (GER)	Kaoru Ogisawa (JPN); Karin Appenzeller (CHE)	Martin Orlik (CZE); Eliane Ueltschi (CHE)
Fiesch (CHE)	:	Christian Tamegger (AUT); Marina Olexina (RUS)	Marina Olexina (RUS); Klaudia Bulgakow (POL)	Martin Pacejka (CZE); Eliane Ueltschi (CHE)
Kobarid (SLO)	:	Chrigel Maurer (CHE); Renata Kuhnova (CZE)	Denis Cortella (FRA); Karin Appenzeller (CHE)	Tomas Brauner (CZE); Marina Olexina (RUS)
St. Leu (La Réunion)	:	Chrigel Maurer (CHE); Petra Krausova (CZE)	Bruno Arnold (CHE); Anja Kroll (CHE)	Gregory Blondeau (FRA); Karin Appenzeller (CHE)
Total:		Chrigel Maurer (CHE); Karin Appenzeller (CHE)	Gregory Blondeau (FRA); Petra Krausova (CZE)	Tomas Brauner (CZE); Anja Kroll (CHE)

== Winners for 2005 ==
Host site		Winner	Second	Third
Sopot (BUL)	:	Chrigel Maurer (CHE); Petra Krausova (CZE)	Gregory Blondeau (FRA); Keiko Hiraki (JPN)	Armin Eder (AUT); Eliane Ueltschi (CHE)
Bourg St. Maurice (FRA)	:	Patrick Berod (FRA); Ewa Wisnierska Cieslewicz (GER)	Bruce Goldsmith (GBR); Petra Krausova (CZE)	Frank Brown (BRA); Keiko Hiraki (JPN)
Niš (SRB)	:	Chrigel Maurer (CHE); Ewa Wisnierska Cieslewicz (GER)	Charles Cazaux (FRA); Karin Appenzeller (CHE)	Luciano Tcacenco Bender (BRA); Petra Krausova (CZE)
Monte Cornizzolo (ITA)	:	Chrigel Maurer (CHE); Ewa Wisnierska Cieslewicz (GER)	Martin Orlik (CZE); Petra Krausova (CZE)	Max Jeanpierre (FRA); Marina Olexina (RUS)
Serra da Estrela (POR)	:	Torsten Siegel (GER); Ewa Wisnierska Cieslewicz (GER)	Marco Littame (ITA); Keiko Hiraki (JPN)	Chrigel Maurer (CHE); Anja Kroll (CHE)
Total:		Chrigel Maurer (CHE); Ewa Wisnierska Cieslewicz (GER)	Max Jeanpierre (FRA); Petra Krausova (CZE)	David Ohlidal (CZE); Karin Appenzeller (CHE)

== Winners for 2004 ==
Host site		Winner	Second	Third
Monte Grappa (ITA)	:	Chrigel Maurer (CHE); Petra Krausova (CZE)	Steve Cox (CHE); Caroll Licini (CHE)	Bruce Goldsmith (GBR); Karin Appenzeller (CHE)
Abtenau (AUT)	:	Christian Tamegger (AUT); Louise Crandal (DEN)	Paolo Zammarchi (ITA); Karin Appenzeller (CHE)	Achim Joos (GER); Caroll Licini (CHE)
Talloires (FRA)	:	Christian Tamegger (AUT); Petra Krausova (CZE)	Frank Brown (BRA); Elisabeth Rauchenberger (CHE)	Andreas Birenstihl (CHE); Elisa Houdry (FRA)
Kayseri (TUR)	:	Achim Joos (GER); Petra Krausova (CZE)	Tomas Brauner (CZE); Elisabeth Rauchenberger (CHE)	Chrigel Maurer (CHE); Caroline Brille (FRA)
Tapalpa (MEX)	:	Stefan Wyss (CHE); Elisabeth Rauchenberger (CHE)	Paolo Zammarchi (ITA); Caroll Licini (CHE)	Torsten Siegel (GER); Caroline Brille (FRA)
Total:	:	Oliver Rössel (GER); Petra Krausova (CZE)	Paolo Zammarchi (ITA); Elisabeth Rauchenberger (CHE)	Frank Brown (BRA); Caroline Brille (FRA)

== Winners before 2004 ==
Year	Overall	Female
2003	Achim Joos (DEU)	Petra Krausova (CZE)
2002	Alex Hofer (CHE)	Petra Krausova (CZE)
2001	Patrick Bérod (FRA)	Louise Crandal (DEN)
2000	André Hediger (CHE)	Louise Crandal (DEN)
1999	Kari Eisenhut (CHE)	Sandie Cochepain (FRA)
1998	Peter Lüthi (CHE)	Claire Bernie (FRA)
1997	Jimmy Pacher (ITA)	Claire Bernie (FRA)
1996	Christian Tamegger (AUT)	Nanou Berger (FRA)
1995	Hans Bollinger (CHE)	Camilla Pemer (AUT)
1994	Jimmy Pacher (ITA)	Nanou Berger (FRA)
1993	Richard Gallon (FRA)	Camilla Pemer (AUT)
1992	Uli Wiesmeier (DEU)	Nanou Berger (FRA)

== See also ==
- Paragliding Accuracy World Cup (PGAWC)
