= Cumulonimbus and aviation =

Dangers of cloud formations to aircraft

Numerous aviation accidents have occurred in the vicinity of thunderstorms due to the density of clouds. It is often said that the turbulence can be extreme enough inside a cumulonimbus to tear an aircraft into pieces, and even strong enough to hold a skydiver. However, this kind of accident is relatively rare. Moreover, the turbulence under a thunderstorm can be non-existent and is usually no more than moderate. Most thunderstorm-related crashes occur due to a stall close to the ground when the pilot gets caught by surprise by a thunderstorm-induced wind shift. Moreover, aircraft damage caused by thunderstorms is rarely in the form of structural failure due to turbulence but is typically less severe and the consequence of secondary effects of thunderstorms (e.g., denting by hail or paint removal by high-speed flight in torrential rain).

Cumulonimbus clouds are known to be extremely dangerous to air traffic, and it is recommended to avoid them as much as possible. Cumulonimbus can be extremely insidious, and an inattentive pilot can end up in a very dangerous situation while flying in apparently very calm air.

While there is a gradation with respect to thunderstorm severity, there is little quantitative difference between a significant shower generated by a cumulus congestus and a small thunderstorm with a few thunderclaps associated with a small cumulonimbus. For this reason, a glider pilot could exploit the rising air under a thunderstorm without recognising the situation – thinking instead that the rising air was due to a more benign variety of cumulus. However, forecasting thunderstorm severity is an inexact science; in numerous occasions, pilots got trapped by underestimating the severity of a thunderstorm that suddenly strengthened.

== General hazards to aircraft ==
Even large airliners avoid crossing the path of a cumulonimbus. Two dangerous effects of cumulonimbus have been put forward to explain the crash of flight AF447 that sank into the sea on 31 May 2009 about 600 kilometres (370 mi) northeast of Brazil. It encountered a mesoscale convective system in the Intertropical Convergence Zone (known by sailors as the "doldrums"), where cumulonimbus rise to more than 15 kilometres (49,000 ft) in altitude. However, the aircraft did not disintegrate in flight. A different hypothesis was put forward and later confirmed: accumulation of ice on the aircraft's pitot tubes.

The inconsistency between the airspeeds measured by the different sensors is one of the causes of the accident according to the final report.

The US FAA recommends that aircraft (including gliders) stay at least 20 nautical miles away from a severe thunderstorm, while a glider pilot could be tempted to use the updraughts below and inside the cloud. There are two sorts of danger for this type of aircraft. One is related to the shear effects between updraughts and downdraughts inside the cloud – effects that can smash the glider. This shear creates a Kelvin-Helmholtz instability that can generate extremely violent sub-vortices. The second danger is more insidious: the strong updraughts below a supercell cumulonimbus can cover a large area and contain little or no turbulence as explained below. In this case, the glider can be sucked into the cloud, where the pilot can quickly lose visual reference to the ground, causing conditions to quickly become Instrument meteorological conditions (IMC), meaning that pilots are forced to fly by instruments alone, without visual reference of the ground or sky. In these conditions, the aircraft (if not equipped for IMC flight and flown by a pilot experienced in IMC flight) is likely to enter a graveyard spiral and eventually break up by exceeding the wing load limit. In this situation, the cause of the disintegration of the aircraft is not atmospheric turbulence but is the inability of the pilot to control the aircraft following the loss of visual reference to the ground. In the case of an instrument flight, cumulonimbus can catch a pilot by surprise when embedded in a more benign cloud mass. For example, nimbostratus can originate from the spreading of a cumulonimbus (nimbostratus cumulonimbogenitus), making the presence of active convective cells likely. Small private airplanes are generally not equipped with on-board weather radars; and during an IFR approach, they can be sent accidentally by air traffic control to non-obvious active cells.

== Updraft characteristics ==
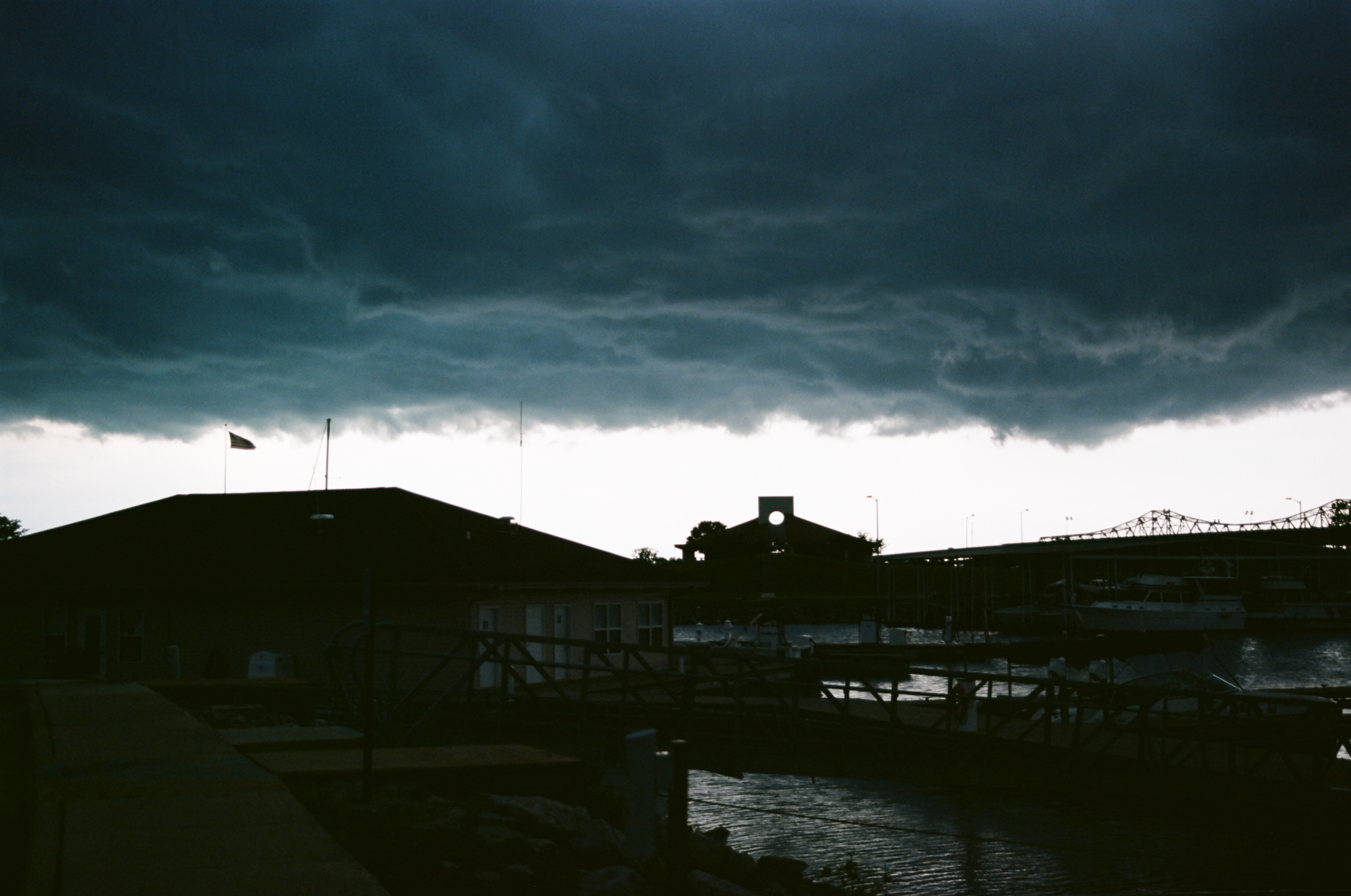
Figure 1 : Forward area of a severe cumulonimbus moving to the west. This area is precipitation-free and the site of widespread updrafts.

The updrafts under a cumulonimbus can be extremely laminar, extensive, and uniform, this is particularly true during the buildup of the thunderstorm. They can last more than one hour and correspond to a steady state of the cumulonimbus.

The updraft under the cloud is mostly due to buoyancy, but there is also a large pressure difference between the base and the top of the cumulonimbus (larger than would be found in this height range outside the cloud) and local low-level mechanical lifting such as the lifting generated by a downburst. The two last phenomena can overcome a stable air zone close to the surface by lifting cooler air parcels to a level where they are eventually warmer than the surrounding air. This can happen if these mechanical phenomena lift the parcel above the lifted condensation level (LCL), above which height the parcel's temperature T_{p}(z) decreases less with height (due to the release of latent heat and at approximately 6.5 K/km) than the surrounding air temperature T_{s}(z) decreases with height in the case of a conditionally unstable lapse rate aloft. In other words, the parcel can be lifted to a height where $\left|{dT_p(z) \over d z}\right| < \left|{dT_s(z) \over d z}\right|$, where the former is the cooling rate of the parcel and the latter is the ambient lapse rate. In these conditions, the rising parcel may eventually become warmer than the surrounding air; in other words, there may exist a level above which $T_p(z) > T_s(z)$. This scenario's conditionally unstable lapse rate aloft is relatively common when thunderstorms exist. In effect, at low level, such air parcels are sucked into the cloud as if by a vacuum cleaner. Soaring pilots refer to this near-base sucking as "cloud suck", a phenomenon known to generally be more intense the taller the cumulus cloud – and to thus be at maximum intensity with a cumulonimbus. Since the dynamic updraft is wide, the updraft velocity varies little laterally and thus the turbulence is minimised. So, it is said:

The observations reported by Marwitz (1973), Grandia and Marwitz (1975), and Ellrod and Marwitz (1976) indicate that the updraft air entering the base of cumulonimbi is smooth and relatively free of turbulence and remains so through a significant depth of the WER.

In fact, Ellrod and Marwitz's paper is more general. These authors state that in general, the buoyancy beneath the cumulonimbus cloud base is often negative. This explains why updrafts underneath the base of a cumulonimbus are often laminar. This phenomenon is well known by glider pilots. (see below). The phenomenon is enhanced under the weak echo region of a supercell thunderstorm that is extremely dangerous. At approximately 4 kilometres (13,000 ft) these smooth updrafts become suddenly very turbulent.

In general, updrafts reach their maximum intensity at 6 kilometres (20,000 ft) above the ground. At this altitude, a phase change occurs where water droplets become ice crystals and therefore release energy in the form of latent heat and thus the updraft strength increases. Supercell thunderstorms or derechos can have gigantic updrafts at this altitude, updrafts with speeds that can exceed 40 metres per second (78 kn). Such an updraft speed corresponds to the wind speed of a small hurricane. The speed can even exceed 50 metres per second (97 kn). The maximum number in the Beaufort scale is 12 ("hurricane force" wind) and is assigned to wind speeds of 64 knots or greater. If the Beaufort scale were extended, these updrafts would have a Beaufort number of 14 in the vertical direction. The turbulence is then extreme at this altitude.

Moreover, the diameters of the updraft columns vary between 2 km (air mass thunderstorm) and 10 km (supercell thunderstorm). The height of the cumulonimbus base is extremely variable. It varies from a few tens of meters above the ground to 4000 m above the ground. In the latter case, the updrafts can originate either from the ground (if the air is very dry – typical of deserts) or from aloft (when altocumulus castellanus degenerates into cumulonimbus). When the updraft originates from aloft, this is considered elevated convection.

== Dangers pertaining to downbursts ==
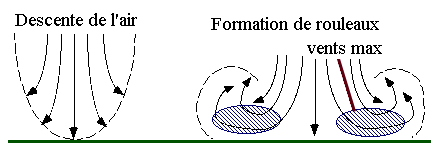
Figure 2: Spreading of a downburst close to the ground.

Downbursts are dangerous for many reasons. First, downdraughts under cumulonimbus can be severe and extensive. A sailplane flying at 50 knots in a downdraught of 15 knots has an approximate glide ratio of 3, meaning that it covers only about three metres of ground for every metre it descends. Assuming that the glider is at cloud base height at 2,000 metres (6,600 ft), if it remains in the downdraught the entire time, it will only be able to glide 6 kilometres (3.7 mi) before being forced to land – likely under difficult and dangerous conditions. Even if the glider lands safely, it could be destroyed later by a wind gust. So when a rain curtain shows a downburst, it is of paramount importance to not land in this area.

Downdraughts of 50 knots are possible and can generate wind gusts of 60 knots or more. Safely landing a light aircraft in these conditions can be virtually impossible. Moreover, close to the ground, a glider or airplane pilot can be caught by surprise by a sudden reversal of the wind direction and transition from an upwind to a downwind situation. If the airspeed becomes too low, the aircraft will stall and may crash into the ground due to the altitude lost recovering from the stall. As a consequence of famous instances of crashes of this nature in the United States, a network of wind profilers and Terminal Doppler Weather Radars was developed in the vicinity of airports to monitor this wind shear. Based on FAA rules, every pilot must inquire about the wind speed and direction before landing.

Compared to airliners, sailplanes fly at low airspeeds. The usual approach speed of a sailplane is around 50 knots, but let's assume that the pilot is extra "careful" and flies his approach at 65 knots. William Cotton claims that the wind shear can be as high as 50 knots. In such a case, if the shear direction is such that the airspeed is reduced by the shear amount, this pilot's airspeed will drop to 15 knots, which is well below his glider's stall speed (typically 35–40 knots). If this airspeed drop occurs during the transition from the base leg to the final approach, the aircraft may enter into a spin from which there isn't enough altitude to recover. The exact quotation is the following:

Upon encountering a downburst with say a 50 kt tailwind component, airspeed can drop from say 65 kts to more like 15 kts. If the sailplane is making a turn from baseleg to final, the pilot finds himself (herself) in one of the deadliest situations a pilot can encounter, a "stall-spin" situation with no chance to recover since the aircraft is close to the ground on final approach.

So when the pilot encounters benign cumulonimbus, it may be a better choice to stay aloft and use the updraughts under the cumulus in front of the thunderstorm along the flanking line (or even under the cumulonimbus itself in its laminar region) and wait for the thunderstorm to dissipate instead of attempting a landing in the presence of possible downbursts.

== Flight inside cumulonimbus ==
=== Soaring ===
In some countries, sailplanes are permitted to fly inside clouds. For example, during the 1972 World Soaring Championship at Vršac, Yugoslavia, Helmut Reichmann attempted to use the violent updraughts associated with cumulonimbus. Initially, he found an updraught of +8 m/s. After half a circle, he was in a downdraught of −15 m/s. He had to land very shortly afterward. The thunderstorm was in its mature stage. In another example, Terry Delore got trapped in a severe thunderstorm. He entered a seemingly innocuous cumulus at 2,000 feet (610 m). This cumulus evolved into a large cumulonimbus. At first, the flight inside the cloud was turbulence-free. Then his glider suddenly became uncontrollable. He was either inverted, in a nosedive, or in a chandelle. The airbrakes became stuck open due to hailstones blocking the orifices. When he landed, the airfield was still covered by hailstones. The wind gusts were between 30 and 40 knots. Everyone on the ground feared for the pilot's life. In the same book, the author narrates that an Italian instructor at Rieti had his students climb 10,000 metres (33,000 ft) inside cumulonimbus so that they get accustomed to them.

As mentioned above, a climb inside a cumulonimbus can be initially very smooth (due to the negative buoyancy of the air parcel) and suddenly become horribly turbulent. As an example, a glider pilot found initially very laminar updraughts and got sucked into the cloud where he encountered accelerations of 18 g and became unconscious.

Due to the phase change of water droplets (to ice), the cumulonimbus top is almost always turbulent. The glider can become covered with ice, and the controls can freeze and remain stuck. Many accidents of this kind have occurred. If the pilot bails out and opens their parachute, they may be sucked upward (or at least held aloft) as happened to William Rankin after ejecting from an F-8 fighter jet and falling into a cumulonimbus (within which his parachute opened).

A skydiver or paraglider pilot under a cumulonimbus is exposed to a potentially deadly risk of being rapidly sucked up to the top the cloud and being suffocated, struck by lightning, or frozen. If they survive, they may suffer irreversible brain damage due to lack of oxygen or require amputation as a consequence of frostbite. German paraglider pilot Ewa Wiśnierska barely survived a climb of more than 9,000 metres (30,000 ft) inside a cumulonimbus.

=== Commercial aviation ===
Heavy transportation airplanes may occasionally have to cross a thunderstorm line associated with a cold front or a squall. They may not be able to overfly the cumulonimbus, because at 36,000 feet, the aircraft may be in or near what is known as the coffin corner (stall speed is close to speed of sound), thus making it structurally dangerous to climb higher. However, some cells can rise to 70,000 feet. Another option would be to navigate around the cells. This is strongly discouraged, however, because in the opening, new cells can grow very rapidly and engulf the aircraft. Whenever an aircraft moves to the west and crosses a thunderstorm line, the pilot will first encounter a line of powerful and laminar updraughts (that are not thermal but dynamic). The pilot should refrain from pushing the stick to try to maintain a constant altitude (similar to mountain waves), because pushing the stick can cause the airspeed to increase to the point of hitting the yellow arc (on the airspeed indicator). An airspeed this high is not permissible in turbulent conditions and may lead to break-up of the aircraft. When the pilot exits the updraught zone, he will encounter very strong turbulence due to the shear between rising and sinking air. If the airspeed is too high at this point, the airplane will break apart. The crash of Flight AF 447 is indirectly related to this situation: the pilot opted for the shortest path while crossing the thunderstorm line associated with the Intertropical Convergence Zone, and the pitot tubes iced over. What followed is known.

On-board radars can be deceiving. Hail shafts generate weak radar echoes, which means radar would guide the pilot there—but, they're significantly more dangerous than cloudbursts. Close to the ground, heavy rain (or snow at altitude) tends to dampen turbulence (it is said that when rain comes, most of the danger is gone). So another counter-intuitive recommendation is to fly toward the zone of heavy precipitation or toward the darkest area of the thunderstorm line. This recommendation contradicts the usual use of on-board radars to avoid areas of strong precipitation, which is usually the best course of action. There is no "miracle" solution, and the best option is to avoid these thunderstorm systems by having enough fuel on board, thus reducing the temptation to take a more dangerous route in the interest of fuel savings.

Also, St. Elmo's fires while flying inside cumulonimbus can burn out the on-board electronic equipment and even pierce a wing by melting the metal skin.

== Dangers pertaining to supercell thunderstorms ==
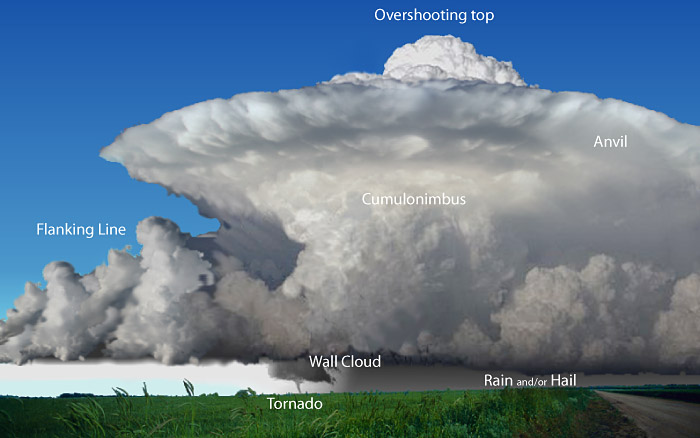
Figure 3 : Picture of a supercell with its characteristics

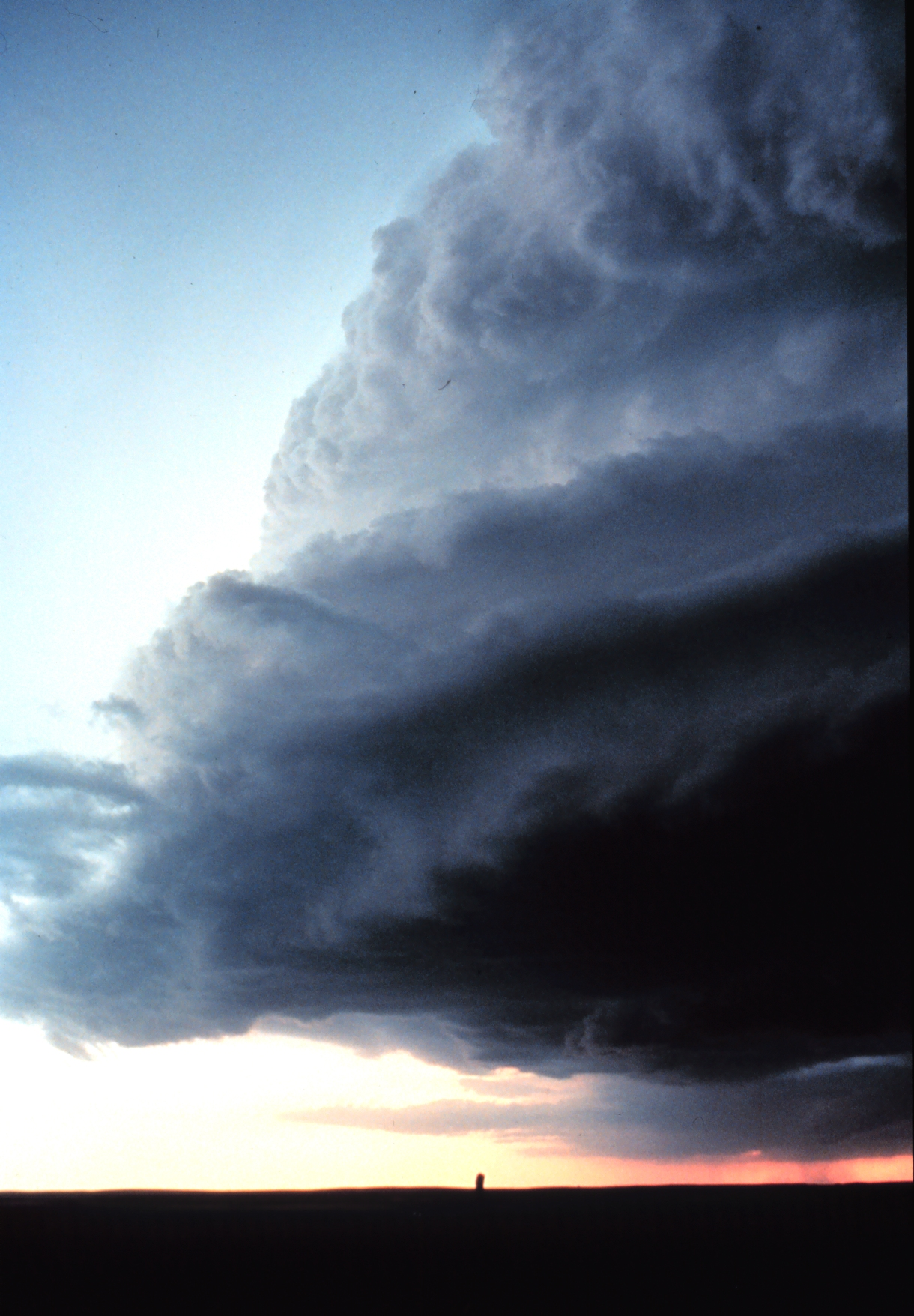
Figure 4 : Picture of the forward area of a supercell that seems usable by a glider. It is made of small cumulonimbus and an arcus. This area is treacherous because the updraughts will be laminar.

The updraughts inside a cumulonimbus associated with a supercell thunderstorm can reach 45 metres per second (87 kn). This corresponds to the wind speed of a weak hurricane. Moreover, the turbulence inside a cloud can become extreme and break apart an aircraft. Thus, it is extremely dangerous to fly inside such a system.

The thunderstorm system can be divided into two zones in the figure to the left: the precipitation-free zone, located on the left where the airmass has a widespread up motion, and the precipitation zone, on the right where the airmass is sinking. At the point where the two zones meet, there is a wall cloud that could initiate tornadoes. Moreover, even the cumulus congestus associated with a supercell thunderstorm can be very dangerous. Tornadoes can be produced up to 36 kilometres (22 mi) from the main cell.

In the updraught area, the air has a negative buoyancy and is sucked up by a low pressure zone at altitude. Turbulence is annihilated. In particular, in the forward area of the supercell, one can find a flanking line made of cumulus congestus or small cumulonimbus. The cloud base of the flanking line is higher than the base of the main cumulonimbus.

Since the updraught under these clouds (in the flanking line) is mainly dynamic, the airmass being smooth and the cloud base higher, a glider pilot could be tempted to fly in this zone. However, conditions can rapidly become dangerous, since the wall cloud can generate a tornado that will pulverise any aircraft. Moreover, since the rising air is widespread, the glider pilot (especially if flying a low-speed, low-performance glider like a paraglider) may be unable to escape and may be sucked into the cloud up to its top. Thus, the FAA recommends that aircraft should never be closer than 20 miles from severe thunderstorms.

== Other dangers pertaining to cumulonimbus ==
=== Lightning ===
Although it rarely happens, a glider can be struck by lightning. Metal sailplanes are Faraday cages and thus should not be destroyed by a lightning strike. However, gliders made of wood or fibreglass can be destroyed. Moreover, modern sailplanes are filled with electronic devices that can be damaged by lightning. Also, any winch launch is discouraged when a thunderstorm is less than 20 kilometres (12 mi) away, because the air is electrified, and the cable will act as a lightning rod.

=== Hail ===
Hail can shred a sailplane canopy and seriously damage the wings and fuselage. Hail is barely visible and can be encountered in the updraught zone under the cloud. On 5 August 1977, an airplane pilot was taken by surprise in the vicinity of Colorado Springs by a supercell thunderstorm that produced 20 tornadoes. The pilot was flying in eerily calm air (the updraught zone can be laminar) when he saw the sky transitioning from pale grey to inky black. The pilot heard a loud sound that reoccurred more and more frequently. Then a hailstone pierced the windshield, rendering the pilot semi-unconscious. Eventually, the pilot landed his shredded airplane in a field.

=== Tornadoes ===
An EF5 tornado can generate ground winds of unbelievable speed; common sense dictates that an aircraft should never be close to such a meteorological phenomenon. Indeed the wind speed can reach 130 metres per second (250 kn), and one can easily guess that the aircraft can be torn into pieces in such conditions. However, airline transportation aircraft have overflown tornadoes by more than 8,000 feet (2,400 m) without damage. The fact that an airliner does not get destroyed can be explained as follows: tornadoes are violent phenomena only close to the ground and become weaker at height. A glider dared to cross a weak tornado during a soaring contest in Texas in 1967. The cumulonimbus base was at 12,000 feet (3,700 m). The glider crossed an extremely turbulent zone and ended up in a turbulence-free zone inverted. The controls were not responding, and the pilot contemplated abandoning the aircraft. After some time and a big fright, the controls started to respond again, and the pilot was able to continue his flight. Pilots in the vicinity did not notice anything.

On 6 October 1981 a Fokker aircraft hit a tornado which occurred in a supercell near the town of Moerdijk in the Netherlands, all 17 occupants of the aircraft were killed.

An empirical criterion for tornado formation has been developed by Dan Sowa from Northwest Orient Airlines as follows: the cumulonimbus overshooting top must enter into the stratosphere by at least 10000 feet. This criterion is, however, incorrect and the Sonnac tornado is a counter-example. It reached level EF2 while being generated by a small cumulonimbus that did not attain 9,000 metres (30,000 ft).

== Myths and truth about cumulonimbus ==
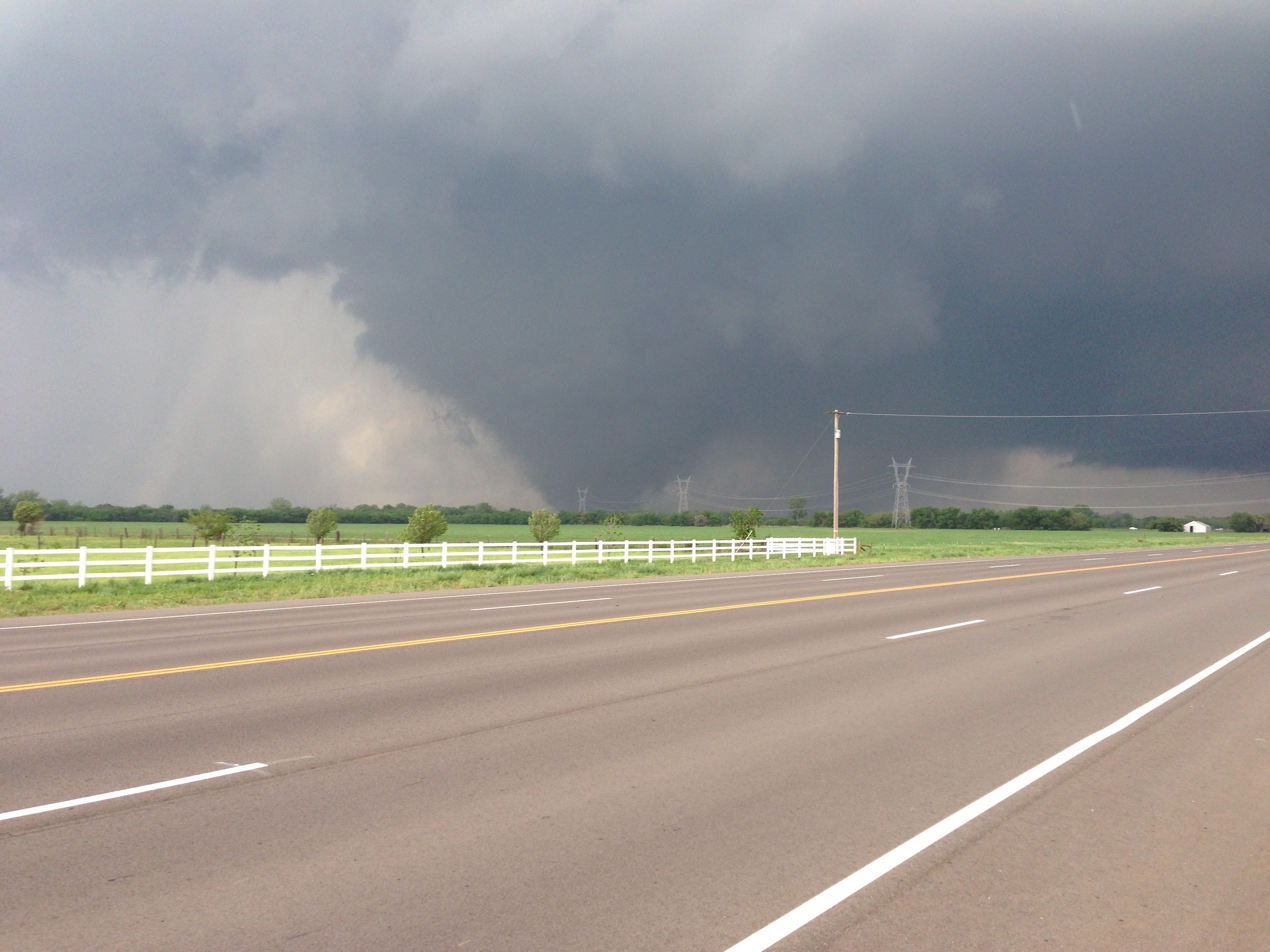
Figure 5 : Picture of a tornado in South Oklahoma City, Oklahoma shortly before it entered Moore shot from a precipitation-free sunlit area. An absent-minded glider pilot would probably have found smooth and moderate updraughts in this sunlit zone.

=== Conventional wisdom ===
As a result of a faulty generalisation, it is very often incorrectly said that cumulonimbus and the updraughts under them are always turbulent. This fallacy originates from the fact that cumulonimbus are actually extremely turbulent at high altitude, and therefore, one might falsely deduce that cumulonimbus are turbulent at all altitudes. Reliable studies and glider pilots' experience have demonstrated that updraughts under cumulonimbus were generally smooth. As seen above, updraughts under a cumulonimbus are often dynamic and thus will be very smooth. The phenomenon is enhanced under the weak echo region of a supercell thunderstorm that is extremely dangerous. However, this phenomenon is little known in the aviation world. Thus, a widespread view in the aeronautical community is that cumulonimbus are always associated with very strong turbulence (at all altitudes) and severe thunderstorms. For example, Gil Roy, in a book endorsed by the fr:Fédération française de vol à voile, claims that:

Les cumulo-nimbus [sic] sont le siège de très violents orages. La partie avant, baptisée " front d'orage " est le théâtre de très fortes turbulences mais aussi de puissantes ascendances. (Translation: The cumulo-nimbus [sic] are always the seat of very violent thunderstorms. The forward area called thunderstorm front is the site of very strong turbulence but also of powerful updraughts.)

Also, the author talks about cumulo-nimbus [sic] of gigantic size that can reach a height of several thousand metres. While the word "several" isn't very precise, a thickness of 8000 metres is fairly typical for a cumulonimbus, with some as thick as 20000 metres or more. Moreover, the majority of cumulonimbus are associated with weak pulse thunderstorms or even simple showers without electric phenomena.

The reference to the thunderstorm front corresponds to the outflow boundary associated with downbursts that are indeed very dangerous and are the site of vortices associated with the Kelvin-Helmholtz instability at the junction between updraughts and downdraughts. However, in front of the thunderstorm, updraughts are generally laminar due to the negative buoyancy of air parcels (see above).

Also, the LUXORION web site states:

Les cumulonimbus provoquent toujours une turbulence sévère [...] Elle peut être rencontrée dans les basses couches et devancer le cumulonimbus de 10 à 25 km. (Translation: The cumulonimbus always generate a severe turbulence [...]. It can be encountered in the lower layers and get ahead of the cumulonimbus by 10 to 25 km.)

Such a claim is too broad and again contradicts the fact that updraughts in front of a thunderstorm are often laminar. However, it is true that the upper layers are almost always turbulent. However, in most cases, the aforesaid turbulence is not extreme. Along the same lines, Didier Morieux states:

Le cumulonimbus [...] est aussi le siège d'ascendances et de descendances pouvant atteindre des vitesses de 15 à 20 m/s donnant lieu à une turbulence considérable, susceptible de mettre en péril la structure des avions les plus solides.(Translation: The cumulonimbus is also the site of updraughts and downdraughts of speeds of 15 to 20 m/s generating considerable turbulence, likely to imperil the structure of most robust airplanes.)

Dennis Pagen is even more explicit. He states:

All the updrafts and downdrafts in a thunderstorm create considerable turbulence due to shear. All we have to do is think of the velocities involved and you can imagine the severity of the turbulence. Thunderstorm turbulence can (and has) tear apart airplanes.

The International cloud atlas soothes these claims: it simply states that "la turbulence is often very strong " below the cloud.

=== Serious hazard to glider pilots ===
A glider pilot convinced that cumulonimbus are always violent risks getting a nasty surprise. If he flies under the flanking line of a supercell thunderstorm and finds that the air is very smooth and updraughts are moderate, he may falsely infer that he is safe and not under a cumulonimbus; since he believes cumulonimbus are always turbulent. He may thus not realise when he is under a secondary cumulonimbus that can suck him inside the cloud, and he may encounter a wall cloud that could generate a tornado that could disintegrate his fragile skiff as shown in Figure 5. Dominique Musto cautions paraglider pilots (that might otherwise be swayed by the above myth) against the false sensation of safety in a region of extended updraughts that are rather weak as follows:

Pourtant malgré un ciel sombre et l'absence de soleil, les ascendances sont douces et généralisées dans tout le secteur. Quelque chose cloche ! Si nous ne réagissons pas très vite pour descendre, une main invisible risque de nous happer et de nous jeter en enfer ! (Translation: However, notwithstanding a dark sky and lack of sunlight, the updraughts are smooth and extended in the entire area. Something is wrong. If we do not react quickly and descend, an invisible hand is likely to grab us and throw us into hell!)

This quotation summarises in three sentences the often-insidious dangers associated with cumulonimbus, dangers that are exacerbated for paraglider pilots, as German paraglider pilot Ewa Wiśnierska experienced. She survived climbing above 9,000 metres (30,000 ft) inside a cumulonimbus. A nearby fellow pilot caught in the same weather event wasn't so fortunate.

As well, in 2014, the 66 years old general Paolo Antoniazzi died after its paraglider got sucked into a cumulonimbus up to the altitude of 9,300 metres (30,500 ft).

== Forerunners of a thunderstorm ==
The above quotation puts informally the harbingers of a thunderstorm. So a cumulonimbus acts as an enormous thermal machine that sucks up the air in the front (left side of Figure 3) and violently throws it out in the back through downbursts (right side of Figure 3). Consequently, a broad area of updraughts will be located in front of the thunderstorm. Typically, in a humid airmass, the updraughts will be on the order of 1 m/s; and in a dry air mass, they will be on the order of 2 to 3 m/s. Therefore, when a glider pilot is in an area where "updraughts are everywhere" and he is close to large clouds (that can be cumulus congestus), he is likely in the vicinity of a building thunderstorm.

== Associated gravity waves ==
The downbursts associated with cumulonimbus can generate gravity waves far way from thunderstorms. These gravity waves can be felt up to 50 kilometres (31 mi) away and in some conditions several hundreds of kilometres away. A severe thunderstorm generating these gravity waves located at more than 40 kilometres (25 mi) away (according to Federal Aviation Administration recommendations) should not affect the safety of aircraft this far from the thunderstorm. These gravity waves can be modelled in the same manner as mountain waves and can be usable by a glider pilot.

== Utilising cumulonimbus in cross-country flight or other ==
=== Exploitation of "small" cumulonimbus ===
Small cumulonimbus can relatively safely be exploited by experienced glider pilots. They generate moderate updraughts that are generally laminar. Thus, pulse-like summer thunderstorms can be used during cross-country flights, since the glider will move away from the cumulonimbus after having (in theory) climbed up to 500 feet below the cloud base (the maximum permissible height in the United States) and the passage of the glider in the proximity of the thunderstorm will be short. For example, during an official contest of the Soaring Society of America, pilots openly played with the cumulonimbus (and even with the updraughts contiguous to downbursts) and boasted about it. However, a rule of thumb says that the distance between two thermals is equal to three times the height of the cloud. Consequently, a cumulonimbus that is 13 km thick will eliminate any convective activity over a radius of approximately 40 km. Most gliders cannot perform such long glides, and therefore, an encounter with a pulse-like thunderstorm in a glider will often be followed soon by the end of the flight.

=== Shear exploitation in the vicinity of a downburst ===
Figure 3.22 from this reference shows the presence of a rotor outside a downburst. A more-than-foolhardy pilot could easily locate this updraught and exploit it. However, this photograph will dissuade any sensible pilot from using such monstrosities. Downbursts are the most significant hazard pertaining to thunderstorms. Moreover, if for any reason the pilot must land (hail storm or other), he will have to cross the downburst immediately above him and there will be a greatly increased chance of crashing – due to the unpredictable decrease of the airspeed. Moreover, if the glider transitions from the updraught to the downdraught, severe turbulence will occur due to the Kelvin-Helmholtz instability in the shear area. However, pilots have nonetheless exploited such updraughts.

=== Exploitation of flanking lines ===
Reckless pilots have exploited squalls by flying in front of thunderstorm systems as if flying along a ridge. The pilot really must land at an airport and put the glider in a hangar; the squall line will catch him again soon and imperil the glider if it is not protected. Dennis Pagen performed a similar flight in front of a supercell cumulonimbus during the Preliminaries of the hang glider 1990 World championship in Brazil where he was able to fly 35 km at high speed without a turn. Pagen acknowledges that his achievement was very risky, since hang gliders (and even more so paragliders) are significantly slower than sailplanes and can much more easily be sucked inside the cloud.

== Conclusion ==
The only cumulonimbus clouds that could be usable by a glider pilot, subject to all necessary reservations, might be isolated small cumulonimbus or at a pinch the flanking lines associated with strong thunderstorms. However, examples above show that a seemingly innocuous cloud can rapidly become very dangerous. Squalls and supercell thunderstorms are definitely deadly hazards to uninformed pilots. Based on visual flight rules, flights in pre-storm areas must be visual; the pilots must be able to watch the evolution of a thundercloud and take the necessary actions of avoidance or to quickly land when appropriate.

The above examples demonstrate that the different phenomena associated with cumulonimbus can jeopardise any type of aircraft and its occupants when the pilot flies in the vicinity and especially inside a thundercloud. An airplane pilot should never come near a cumulonimbus.

== See also ==
- Cloud suck

== Bibliography ==
- William Cotton; Richard Anthes (1989). Storm and Cloud Dynamics. International geophysics series. Vol. 44. Academic Press. ISBN 978-0-12-192530-7.
- William R Cotton; George H Bryan; Susan C Van den Heever (2011). Storm and Cloud Dynamics. International geophysics series. Vol. 99 (Second ed.). Academic Press. ISBN 978-0-12-088542-8.
- Helmut Reichmann (1975). Cross Country Soaring: A Handbook for Performance and Competition Soaring (7th ed.). Soaring Society of America. ISBN 978-1-883813-01-7.
- Terry Delore (2005). Master of the wave. The Caxton Press. ISBN 978-0-473-10744-4.
- Tom Bradbury (1996). Meteorology and Flight (second ed.). A&C Black (Publishers) Ltd. ISBN 978-0-7136-4446-3.
- Dennis Pagen (1992). Understanding the sky. Dennis Pagen Sport Aviation Publications. ISBN 978-0-936310-10-7.
- Dennis Pagen (1993). Performance flying. Dennis Pagen Sport Aviation Publications. ISBN 978-0-936310-11-4.
- Dominique Musto (2014). Parapente Vol de distance (in French). Éditions du Chemin des Crêtes. ISBN 978-2-9539191-4-1.
- Robert N. Buck; Robert O. Buck (2013). Weather Flying Fifth Edition. Mc Graw Hill Education. ISBN 978-0-07-179972-0.
- Howard B. Bluestein (2013). Severe Convective Thunderstorms and Tornadoes Observations and Dynamics. Springer-Verlag. doi:10.1007/978-3-642-05381-8. ISBN 978-3-642-05380-1. S2CID 127130083.
