= William Rankin =

Survivor of fall through a thunderstorm cloud

William Henry Rankin
- Born: October 16, 1920; Pittsburgh, Pennsylvania, US
- Died: July 6, 2009 (aged 88); Oakdale, Pennsylvania, US
- Military career
- Allegiance: United States
- Branch: United States Marine Corps Aviation
- Service years: 1940–1964
- Rank: Lieutenant colonel

Lieutenant Colonel William Henry Rankin (October 16, 1920 – July 6, 2009) was the first person to survive a fall from the top of a cumulonimbus thunderstorm cloud. He was a pilot in the United States Marine Corps and a World War II and Korean War veteran. In 1959, he was flying an F-8 Crusader jet fighter over a cumulonimbus cloud when the engine failed, and he ejected and parachuted into the cloud. Rankin wrote a book about his experience, The Man Who Rode the Thunder.

== Ejection ==
On July 26, 1959, Rankin was flying from Naval Air Station South Weymouth, Massachusetts, to Marine Corps Air Station Beaufort in South Carolina. He climbed over a thunderhead that peaked at 45,000 feet (13,700 m); then—at 47,000 feet (14,300 m) and at mach 0.82—he heard a loud bump and rumble from the engine. The engine stopped, and a fire warning light flashed. He pulled the lever to deploy auxiliary power, and it broke off in his hand. Though not wearing a pressure suit, at 6:00 p.m. he ejected into the −50 °C (−58 °F) air. He suffered immediate frostbite, and decompression caused his eyes, ears, nose, and mouth to bleed. His abdomen swelled severely. He did, however, manage to make use of his emergency oxygen supply.

Five minutes after he abandoned the plane, his parachute had not opened. While in the upper regions of the thunderstorm, with near-zero visibility, the parachute opened prematurely instead of at 10,000 feet (3,000 m) because the storm had affected the barometric parachute switch and caused it to open. After ten minutes, Rankin was still aloft, carried by updrafts and getting hit by hailstones. Violent spinning and pounding caused him to vomit. Lightning appeared, which he described as blue sheets several feet thick, and thunder that he could feel. "I saw lightning all around me, over, above, everywhere, and I saw it in every shape imaginable. But when very close it appeared mainly as a huge, bluish sheet, several feet thick, sometimes sticking close to me in pairs, like the blades of a scissor..." The rain forced him to hold his breath to keep from drowning. One lightning bolt lit up the parachute, making Rankin believe he had died.

Conditions calmed, and he descended into a forest. His watch read 6:40 p.m. It had been 40 minutes since he had ejected. He searched for help and eventually was admitted into a hospital at Ahoskie, North Carolina. He suffered from frostbite, welts, bruises, and severe decompression.

== In popular culture ==
Rankin wrote The Man Who Rode the Thunder about his experience; Floyd C. Gale called the book a "thrilling true adventure". His story was covered in the March 2, 2017, episode of The Dollop Podcast. His story was covered in the television show Mysteries at the Museum, season 14, episode 9.

== See also ==
- Cloud suck
- Ewa Wiśnierska, a paraglider who also went through a thunderstorm cloud.
