= Val-de-Chaise =

- Commune
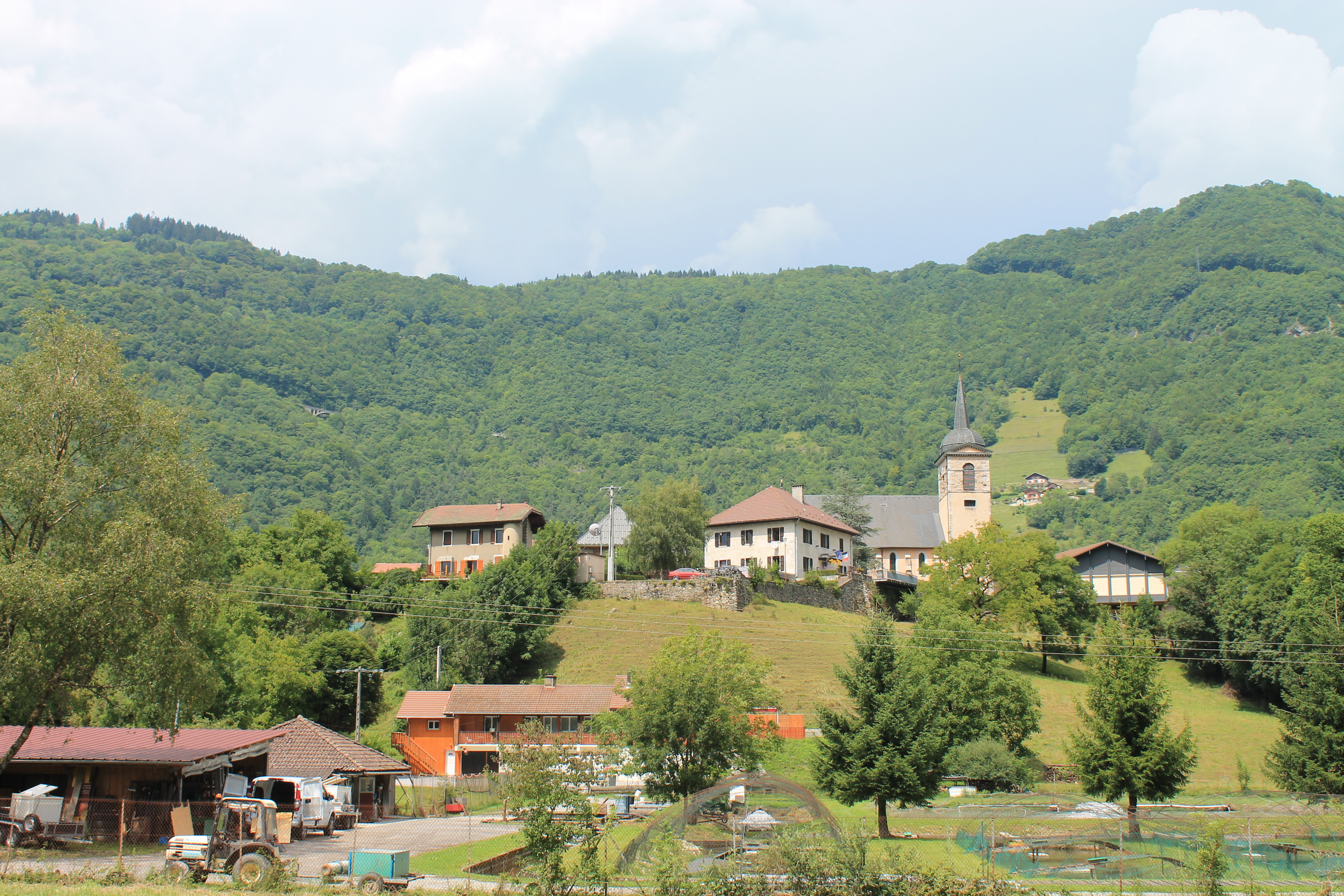
- The village of Marlens
- Location of Val-de-Chaise
- Location within France Location within Auvergne-Rhône-Alpes
- Coordinates: 45°46′07″N 6°21′00″E
- Country: France
- Region: Auvergne-Rhône-Alpes
- Department: Haute-Savoie
- Arrondissement: Annecy
- Canton: Faverges
- Intercommunality: C.C. des Sources du Lac d'Annecy

Government
  - Mayor (2020–2026): Sébastien Scherma
- Area^{1}: 18.7 km^{2} (7.2 sq mi)
- Population (2023): 1,384
  - Density: 74.0/km^{2} (192/sq mi)
- Time zone: UTC+01:00 (CET)
  - Summer (DST): UTC+02:00 (CEST)
- INSEE/Postal code: 74167 /74210
- Website: http://www.valdechaise.fr/
- ^{1} French Land Register data, which excludes lakes, ponds, glaciers > 1 km^{2} (0.386 sq mi or 247 acres) and river estuaries.

Val-de-Chaise (French pronunciation: [val də ʃɛz]) is a commune in the Haute-Savoie department in the Auvergne-Rhône-Alpes region in south-eastern France. It was created on 1 January 2016 when the communes Marlens and Cons-Sainte-Colombe were merged.

== See also ==
- Communes of the Haute-Savoie department
