= Cloud suck =

Atmospheric phenomena

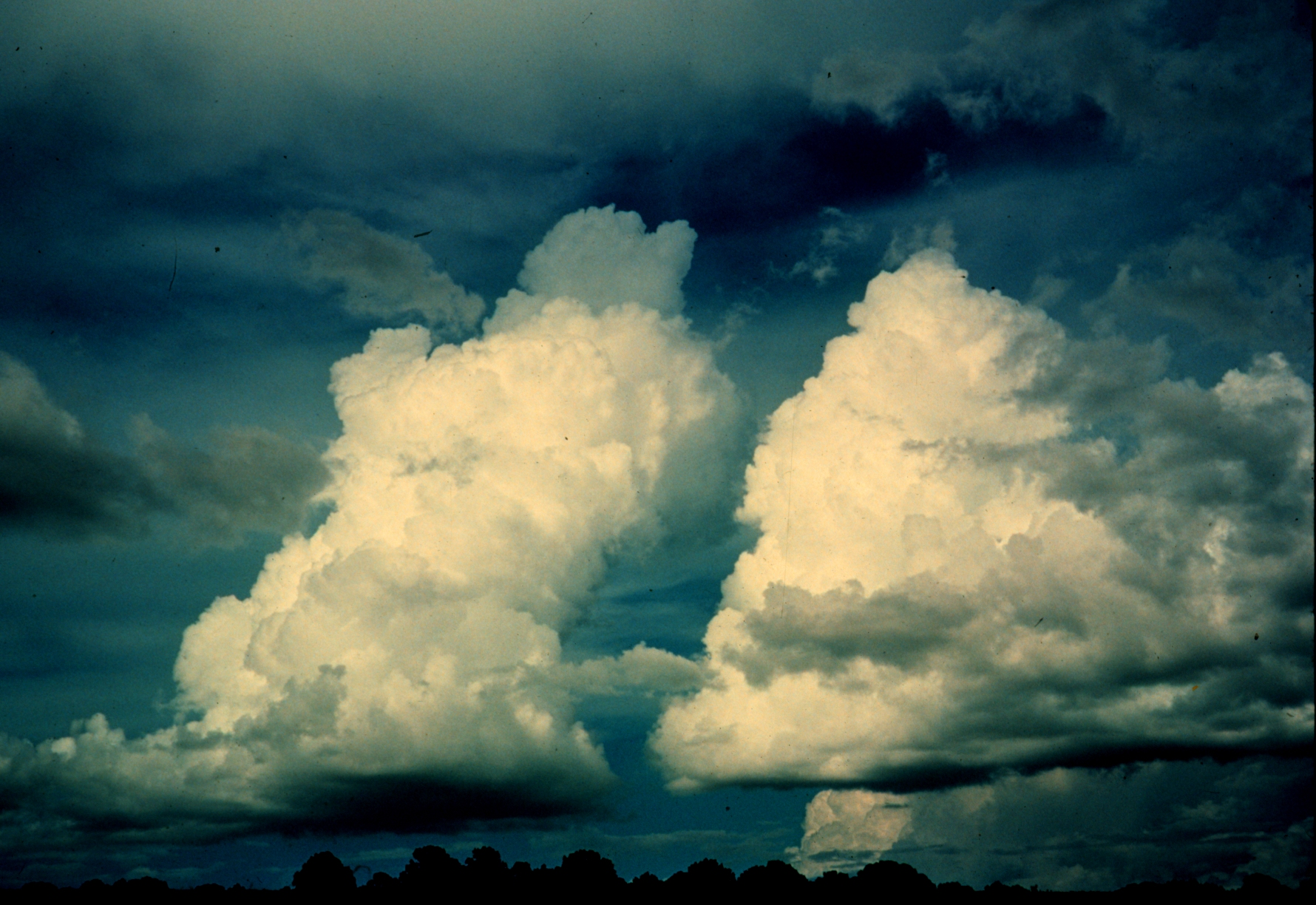
Towering cumulus clouds are often associated with cloud suck.

Cloud suck is a phenomenon commonly known in paragliding, hang gliding, and sailplane flying where pilots experience significant lift due to a thermal under the base of cumulus clouds, especially towering cumulus and cumulonimbus. The vertical extent of a cumulus cloud is a good indicator of the strength of lift beneath it, and the potential for cloud suck. Cloud suck most commonly occurs in low pressure weather and in humid conditions.

Cloud suck is typically associated with an increase in thermal updraft velocity near cloud base. As a parcel of air lifted in a thermal rises, it also cools, and water vapour will eventually condense to form a cloud if the parcel rises above the lifted condensation level. As the water vapour condenses, it releases its latent heat of vaporization, thereby increasing the buoyancy of the parcel. The updraft is amplified by this latent heat release. Although the process that causes this amplification happens above cloud base height, the effect is often noticeable as much as 300 m (1,000 feet) below cloud base. In fact, it is this effect below cloud base, not the effect within the cloud, that is generally referred to by pilots as cloud suck. The telltale signs for a pilot climbing in the thermal under a "sucking" cloud are (1) lift strengthening, (2) lift getting smoother, and (3) widening of the thermal.

Paraglider pilots have reported being unable to descend in strong cloud suck, even after bringing their canopies into deep spiral, which would normally result in a rapid vertical descent. Cloud suck is especially dangerous for paraglider pilots, whose maximum speed is less than 30 knots, because storm clouds (cumulonimbus) can expand and develop rapidly over a large area with accompanying large areas of strong lift.

Compared with hang-gliders and paragliders, sailplanes have much higher top speeds (often over 250 km/h), and can more easily escape powerful cumulonimbus clouds by flying away quickly or by using very effective air brakes. A sailplane also has the added benefit of the pilot being able to put the sailplane into a spin to descend rapidly without over speeding.

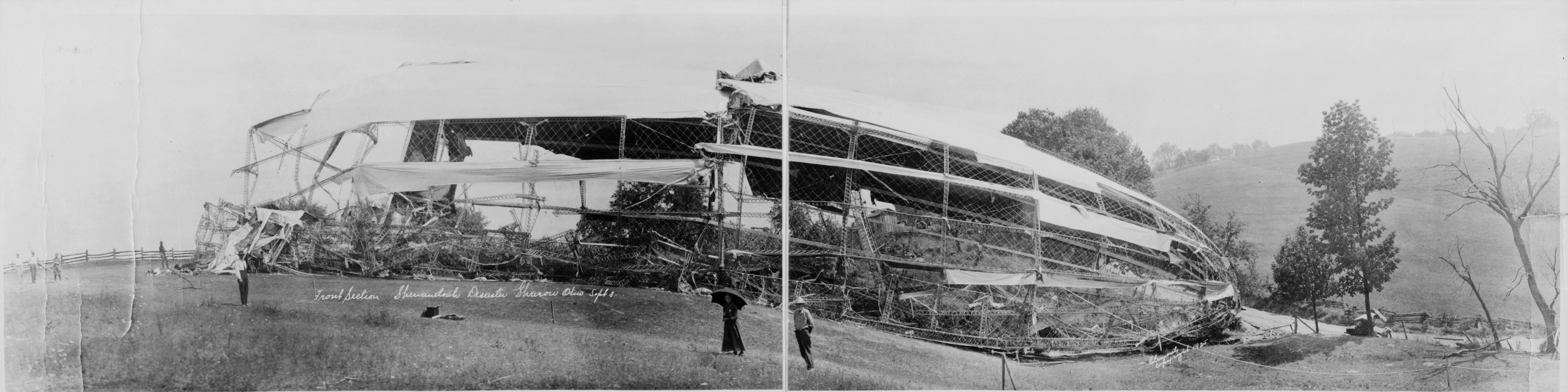
The wreck of the Shenandoah

Cloud suck is also a concern for powered aircraft but is usually not a lethal hazard, except in extreme weather situations. The USS Shenandoah, the first rigid airship built in the United States, and the first in the world to be inflated with helium, was lost in a cloud suck accident associated with a squall line. At about 6:00 AM on 3 September 1925, near Ava in northern Noble County, Ohio, the Shenandoah was suddenly caught in a violent updraft while at an altitude of 2,100 feet (640 m), rising at the rate of a meter per second. At about 6,200 feet (1,900 m) the ascent was checked, but the ship began to descend. When halfway to the ground it was hit by another updraft and began to rise rapidly at an even faster rate. Ultimately the keel snapped, and the ship broke up while still more than a mile above the ground. Shenandoah's commanding officer and 13 other officers and men were killed. Twenty-nine members of the crew survived the break-up, although some received serious injuries.

== Reported incidents ==
On 14 February 2007 while practising for a paragliding contest in Australia, Polish-born German team pilot Ewa Wiśnierska-Cieślewicz was sucked into a cumulonimbus cloud, climbing at up to 20 m per second (4,000 feet per minute) to an altitude of 9,946 m (32,600 feet). She lost consciousness due to hypoxia, but regained consciousness after 30 minutes to an hour, and landed still covered in ice after a three-and-a-half-hour flight. In the same storm, Forty-two-year-old Chinese paraglider pilot He Zhongpin died after being sucked into the same storm system and struck by lightning at 5900 m (19,000 feet). His body was found the next day 15 km (9.3 mi) from his last known position prior to entering the cloud.

In 2014 Italian paraglider Paolo Antoniazzi, a 66-year-old retired Army general, died after being sucked into a thunderstorm.

In 2025 Chinese paraglider Peng Yujiang was lifted 5000m into the air to an elevation of 8000m whilst testing the fit and comfort of his parachute on the ground.

== See also ==
- Cumulonimbus and aviation
