= Cons-Sainte-Colombe =

Cons-Sainte-Colombe Konse (Savoyard)
- Part of Val-de-Chaise
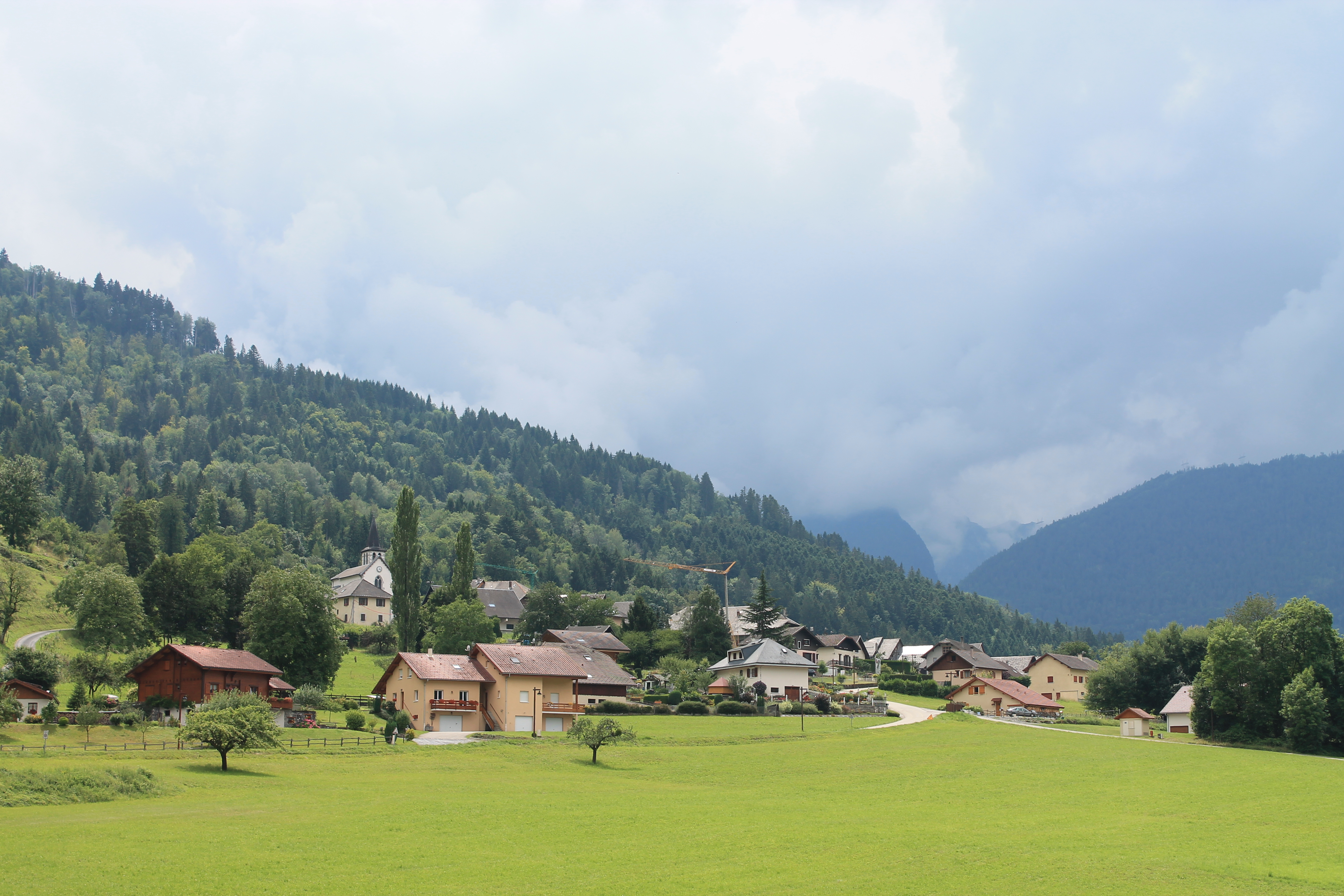
- A general view of Cons-Sainte-Colombe
- Location of Cons-Sainte-Colombe
- Location within France Location within Auvergne-Rhône-Alpes
- Coordinates: 45°44′59″N 6°19′36″E
- Country: France
- Region: Auvergne-Rhône-Alpes
- Department: Haute-Savoie
- Arrondissement: Annecy
- Canton: Faverges
- Commune: Val-de-Chaise
- Area^{1}: 3.47 km^{2} (1.34 sq mi)
- Highest elevation: 2,063 m (6,768 ft)
- Lowest elevation: 479 m (1,572 ft)
- Population (2022): 396
  - Density: 114/km^{2} (296/sq mi)
- Demonym: Colombins / Colombines
- Time zone: UTC+01:00 (CET)
  - Summer (DST): UTC+02:00 (CEST)
- Postal code: 74210
- ^{1} French Land Register data, which excludes lakes, ponds, glaciers > 1 km^{2} (0.386 sq mi or 247 acres) and river estuaries.

Cons-Sainte-Colombe (French pronunciation: [kɔ̃ sɛ̃t kɔlɔ̃b]; Savoyard: Konse) was a commune in the Haute-Savoie department in the Rhône-Alpes region in south-eastern France. On 1 January 2016 it was merged with Marlens to create the new commune Val-de-Chaise. Its population was 396 in 2022.

== See also ==
- Communes of the Haute-Savoie department
