= Pegalajar =

- city
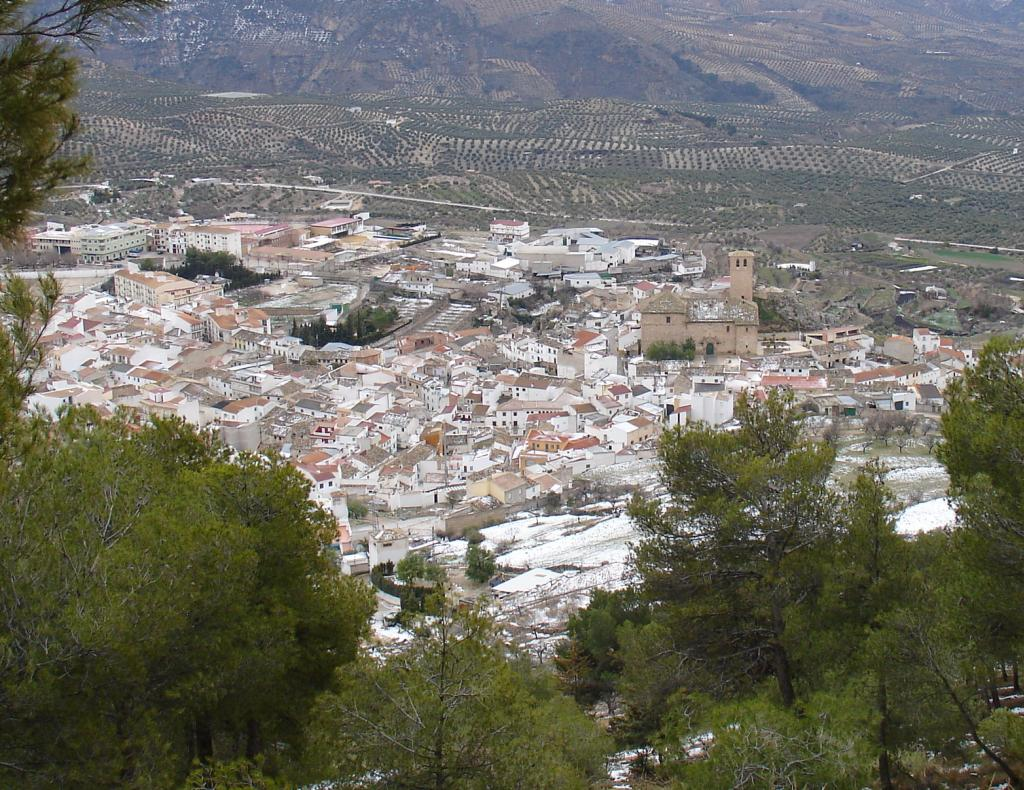

- Flag Coat of arms

- Location in Spain Pegalajar (Andalusia) Pegalajar (Spain)
- Country: Spain
- Autonomous Community: Andalusia
- Province: Jaén
- Municipality: Pegalajar

Area
  - Total: 79 km^{2} (31 sq mi)
- Elevation: 818 m (2,684 ft)

Population (2025-01-01)
  - Total: 2,830
  - Density: 36/km^{2} (93/sq mi)
- Time zone: UTC+1 (CET)
  - Summer (DST): UTC+2 (CEST)

Pegalajar is a city located in the province of Jaén, Spain. According to the 2005 census (INE), the city has a population of 3136 inhabitants.

== See also ==
- List of municipalities in Jaén
