= Pico do Gavião =

Mountain in Brazil

The Pico Do Gavião (Hawk's peak in English) is a mountainous elevation in Brazil located in Andradas, south of Minas Gerais and a tourist attraction in the state.

It is considered one of the best places in the world for free flight practice. The view from the top of its 1663 m of altitude includes several cities. Has hosted stages of national and international championships.
