= Baixo Guandu =

- Municipality
- The Municipality of Baixo Guandu do Espírito Santo
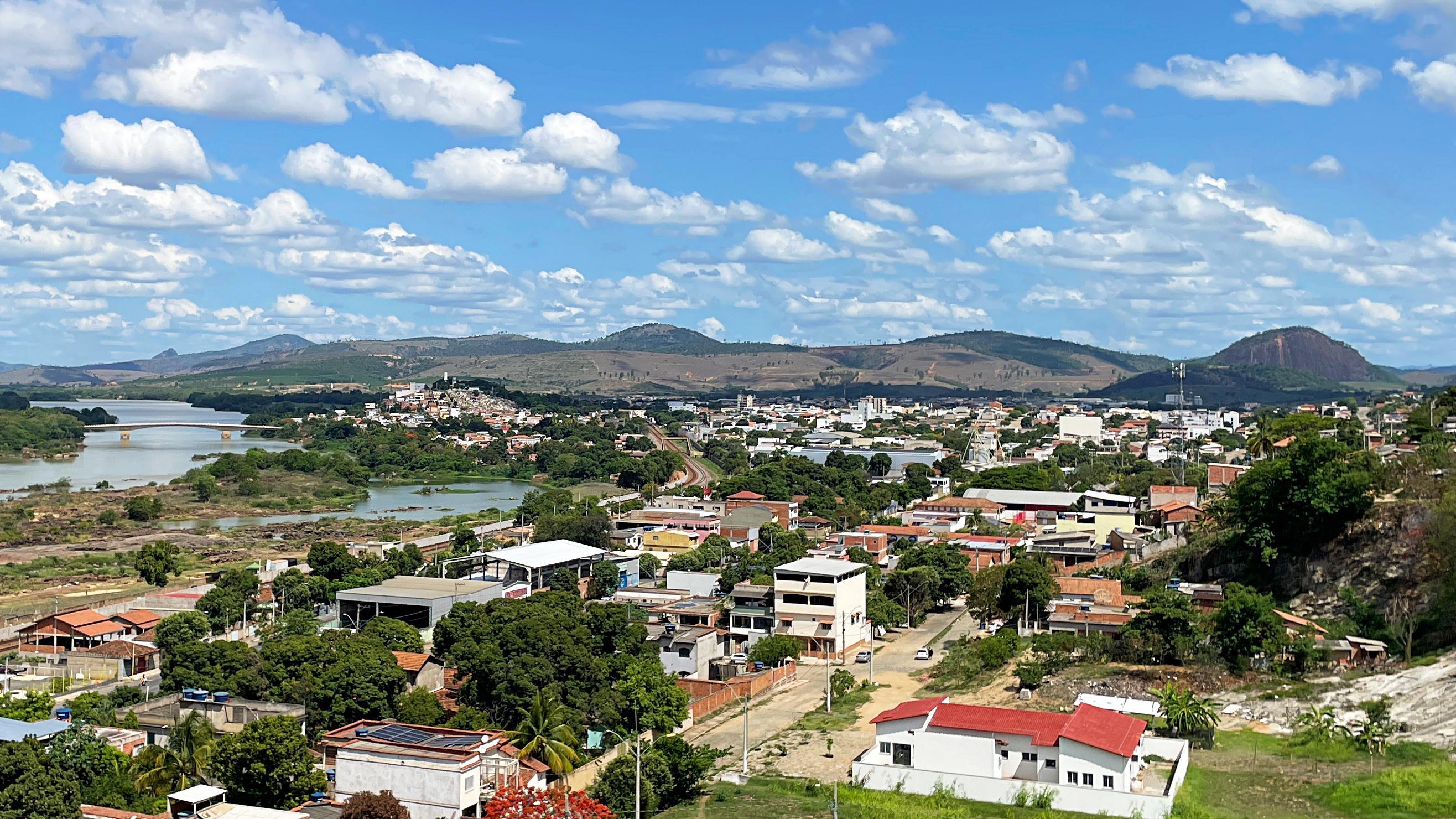
- Partial view of Baixo Guandu seen from the overlook of the Rosário II neighborhood

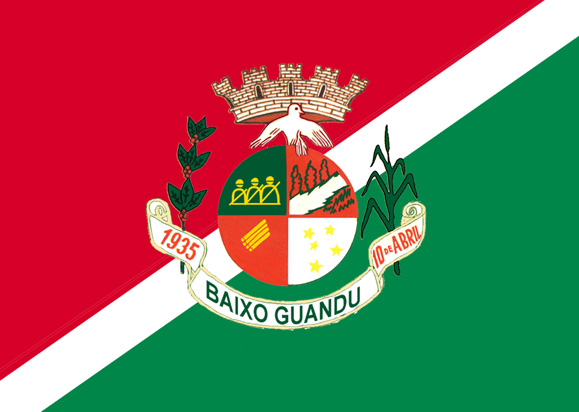
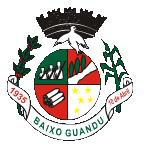
- Flag Coat of arms

- Location in the State of Espírito Santo

- Coordinates: 19°31′08″S 41°00′57″W
- Country: Brazil
- Region: Southeast
- State: Espírito Santo
- Founded: June 8, 1935

Government
  - Mayor: Lastênio Luiz Cardoso (2021-2028)

Area
  - Total: 917.88 km^{2} (354.40 sq mi)

Population (2020)
  - Total: 31,132
  - Density: 31.11/km^{2} (80.6/sq mi)
- Demonym: Guanduense
- Time zone: UTC−3 (BRT)
- Postal Code: 29730-000
- HDI (2000): 0.71 – medium
- Celebration day: April 10
- Website: www.pmbg.es.gov.br

Baixo Guandu is a municipality located in the Brazilian state of Espírito Santo, that was founded on April 10, 1935 and established as a city on June 8 of the same year. The city's celebration day is April 10. Its population was 31,132 (2020) and its area is 918 km^{2} (354 sq mi). The area is most well-known for its exports of coffee, especially from the high mountains of the Alto Mutum Preto district. The main watercourse through the municipality is the Rio Doce river ("Doce" means sweet in Portuguese), whose basin (of 83,500 square kilometers) is composed of 222 municipalities.

== History ==
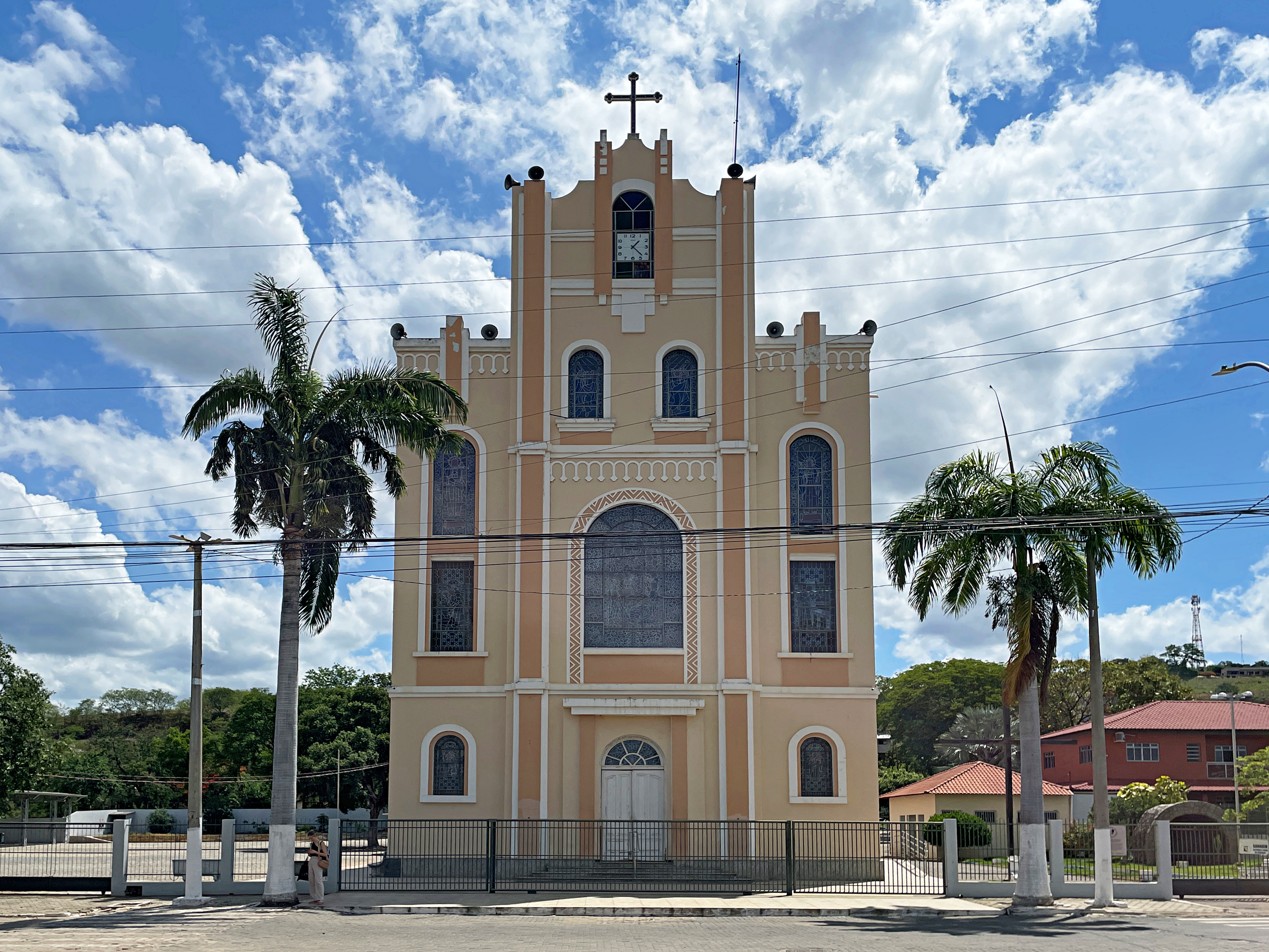
Facade of the Saint Peter Matriz Church

Situated in the valley of the Rio Doce, Baixo Guandu occupies a prominent place in the political and socio-economic development of Espírito Santo.

The county was created on April 10, 1935, it was initially colonized by migrants from Cantagalo, Rio de Janeiro and European immigrants, especially from Italy and Germany.

The history of Baixo Guandu is directly linked to the pioneering spirit that marked the beginning of the 20th century in the Rio Doce valley. The rails of the first train arrived in 1907, and the economic activities were intensified. The abundant wood was removed and taken by train to the capital.

According to the testimony of bandeirantes and travelers who have visited the lower Rio Doce since the second half of the 20th century by the middle of the last century, the Indians Botocudos, native sons and daughters, were masters of the region between Rio Doce and the River São Mateus.

The first penetration into the territory of Baixo Guandu, the former jurisdiction of the municipality of Colatina, occurred in 1875, when the major José Vieira de Carvalho Milagres, a veteran of the Paraguayan War reached the confluence of the Rio Doce river Guandu, and there down the core leading to the city.

The colonization of the region, initiated by major Milagres, had its groundwork in the work of European immigrants of various origins, located in the colonial core of Afonso Pena, now Ibituba.

The foreign colonists settled in the valley of the guandu and the other Ribeirão do Lage. On both sides, there are still today the hallmarks of the European heritage in the region.

The Italians came to Baixo Guandu in 1866 at the initiative of Mr. Francisco Vieira de Carvalho Milagres. A Província do Espírito Santo of June 2, 1866, reported that Mr. Milagres had written to his friend Guilherme Frederico, announcing the departure of Genoa, with forty contractors. Days later, forty Italians came from Rio de Janeiro, for their lands in the Rio Doce (June 5, 1866).

The farmer and settler Francisco Vieira de Carvalho Milagres returned to Europe in 1894 to bring more workers to his land. The immigrants arrived in Matteo Bruzzo, as news of the State of Espírito Santo on December 8 of the same year. On December 10, they travelled to Rio Doce, and from there, they headed to their destination, where, even today, their descendants can be found.

As if it had been the desire to repair the abolition of the District of Baixo Guandu, President Henrique da Silva Coutinho created the colony of 1905, including this area, which was not the legitimate Baixo Guandu, to the limits with the municipality of Afonso Cláudio and Minas Gerais. Divided and donated a portion of the batch, they were sold to Italian, French, German, and Spanish settlers, who crowded them.

The farmer Francisco da Cunha Ramaldes, born in 1861, son of José da Cunha Ramaldes and Balbina Maria de Jesus, from Lajinha do Chalé, State of Minas Gerais, establishes a coffee plantation in the mountain region of Alto Mutum Preto in 1910, which proves to be very lucrative.

Baixo Guandu was the first Brazilian city to receive water treated with fluoride in 1953, as part of an effort to reduce the incidence of caries, especially among children.

In 1974, the city's largest hydroelectric plant was inaugurated in the state, providing power to Espírito Santo and Minas Gerais. The reservoir, utilising the waters of the Rio Doce, reaches a volume of 39,500,000 cubic meters. The reinforced concrete dam measures 45 meters in height and 539 meters in width.

== Geography ==
=== Climate ===
Temperature:

- Annual average: 30 °C
- Annual maximum average: 40 °C
- Annual minimum average: 20 °C

Average annual rainfall index: 1,500mm

== Transportation ==
Baixo Guandu is served by the Vitória a Minas railroad, a 905 km railroad used to transport iron from the Iron Quadrangle in Minas Gerais to the Port of Tubarão in the state of Espírito Santo. This railroad also carried 1.1 million passengers in 2006.

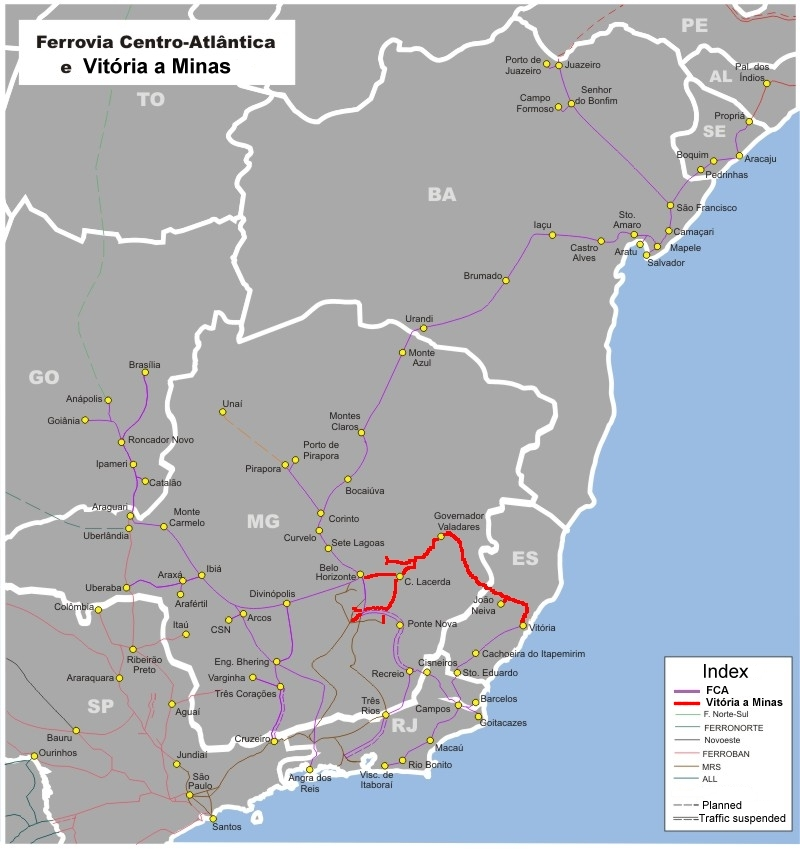
Ferrovia Centro-Atlântica and Vitória a Minas railroads

Distances from major centers:

- Vitória – 186 km
- Belo Horizonte – 499 km
- Rio de Janeiro - 576 km
- São Paulo - 976 km
- Brasília - 1,181 km

== Districts ==
- Baixo Guandu (sede)
- Alto Mutum Preto
- Ibituba
- km 14 do Mutum
- Vila Nova do Bananal
