= Ewa Wiśnierska =

German paraglider

Ewa Wiśnierska (née Cieślewicz; born 23 December 1971) is a Polish paraglider, a member of the German national paragliding team, who won the Paragliding World Cup on several occasions. In 2007, she survived extreme cold, lightning and lack of oxygen during an ascent to almost 10,000 metres (33,000 ft) inside a cumulonimbus cloud.

== Accident ==
On 14 February 2007, in spite of a forecast of violent thunderstorms, Wiśnierska decided to try to fly in order to train for the 2007 World Paragliding Championships near Manilla, New South Wales, Australia. She was sucked into the ascending current of a cumulonimbus cloud, a cloud responsible for large and heavy rains, usually with hail inside and extremely low temperatures. Unable to get out, she was lifted to an altitude of 10,054 metres (32,986 ft), according to her global positioning system (GPS) data. The GPS variometer also tracked vertical speeds of up to 21 m/s (77 kilometres per hour (48 mph)). She landed more than three hours later about 60 kilometres (37 mi) north of her starting position.

In the same weather event, 42-year-old Chinese paraglider He Zhongpin was killed by a lightning strike.

== Personal life ==
Wiśnierska was born in Nysa. She lives in Aschau im Chiemgau, Bavaria, where she teaches paragliding.

== Film ==
In 2010, ABC1 and France 5 made the documentary film Miracle in the Storm about her story. The film was nominated as Most Outstanding Factual Program for the Logie Awards of 2011 and won the category Best Cinematography in a Documentary at the 2010 Australian Film Institute Awards.

See also, Crash Landing on You, a very popular South Korean television series, which may be partially inspired on the event, where Ewa is mentioned by name numerous times.

== See also ==
- Cumulonimbus and aviation
- William Rankin, who survived a similar fall decades earlier
