= Marlens =

Marlens Marlin (Savoyard)
- Part of Val-de-Chaise
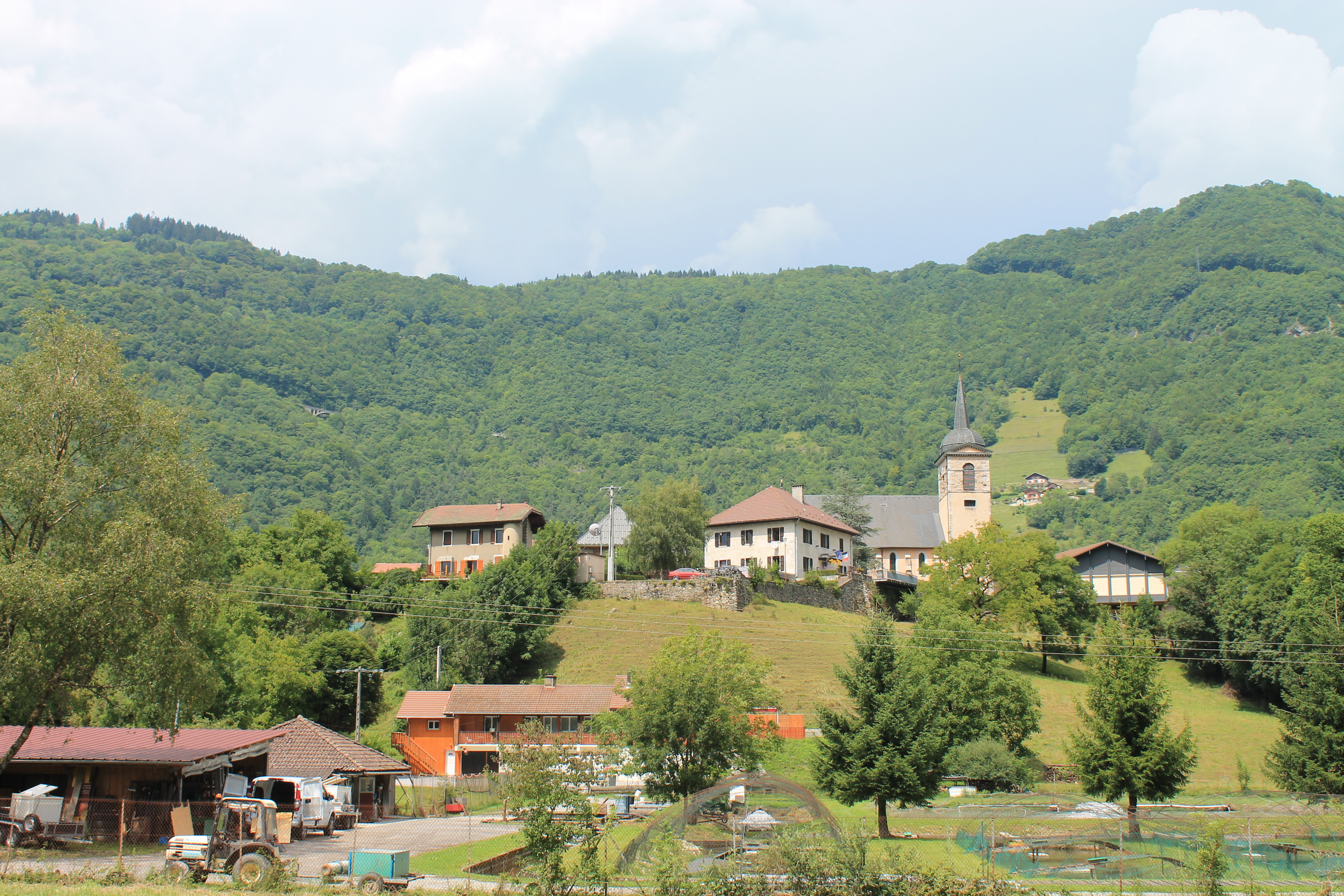
- A general view of Marlens

- Coat of arms
- Location of Marlens
- Location within France Location within Auvergne-Rhône-Alpes
- Coordinates: 45°46′07″N 6°21′00″E
- Country: France
- Region: Auvergne-Rhône-Alpes
- Department: Haute-Savoie
- Arrondissement: Annecy
- Canton: Faverges
- Commune: Val-de-Chaise
- Area^{1}: 15.23 km^{2} (5.88 sq mi)
- Highest elevation: 1,841 m (6,040 ft)
- Lowest elevation: 437 m (1,434 ft)
- Population (2022): 1,005
  - Density: 65.99/km^{2} (170.9/sq mi)
- Demonym: Merlinois / Merlinoises
- Time zone: UTC+01:00 (CET)
  - Summer (DST): UTC+02:00 (CEST)
- Postal code: 74210
- ^{1} French Land Register data, which excludes lakes, ponds, glaciers > 1 km^{2} (0.386 sq mi or 247 acres) and river estuaries.

Marlens (French pronunciation: [maʁlɑ̃]; Savoyard: Marlin) was a commune in the Haute-Savoie department in the Rhône-Alpes region in south-eastern France. On 1 January 2016 it was merged with Cons-Sainte-Colombe to create the new commune Val-de-Chaise. There's a popular paragliding site on the hillside to the north of the village. The paragliders land at the village itself.

== See also ==
- Communes of the Haute-Savoie department
