= Anthony Garrett (disambiguation) =

Tony Garrett (1918–2017) was a British business executive, chairman of Imperial Tobacco.

Anthony Garrett or Tony Garrett may also refer to:

- Tony Garrett (born 1929), partner of Angus Wilson
- Sir Anthony Garrett, General Secretary and Chief Executive of the Association of British Dispensing Opticians
- Tony Garrett (reporter), wheelchair table tennis player, BBC reporter and Disability Executive for BBC Sport (once flew in tandem with Mike Bushell and Judy Leden at Airways Airsports)
- Anthony Garrett (criminal), whose conviction for murder has been questioned due to the use of torture by investigator Richard Zuley of the Chicago Police Department
- Tony Garrett, member of Australian indie pop band The Boat People

== See also ==
- Antony Garrett Lisi, American theoretical physicist and adventure sportsman
