= Thunderfest =

English motorcycling event

- Trade name: The Thundersprint Limited
- Founded: October 8, 1997
- Founder: Frank Melling
- Key people: Frank Melling, Carol Melling

Organised by Carol and Frank Melling, the Thunderfest is a companion event to the now-defunct Thundersprint. A halfway house between full-on racing and parading, the Thunderfest is a time trial aimed primarily at riders.

== The Thundersprint ==
The Thundersprint was a two-day event celebrating motorcycling held annually during the second weekend in May. The event comprised track sessions and sprint races with cavalcades, trade stands and funfair attractions.

The first Thundersprint was held at Hoghton Tower, near Blackburn, and then it moved to Wigan, Southport, Manchester and eventually Northwich, Cheshire as it grew in size. The Thundersprint stayed ten years in Northwich where it was promoted and organised by motorcycle journalist Frank Melling. Unusually for a motorsport event, the Thundersprint at Northwich was aimed as much at families as at 'hard-core' motorbike fans.

According to a report commissioned by Cheshire West and Chester Council, the Thundersprint attracted 145,000 visitors and brought £7.3 million into the local economy. These figures made the Thundersprint one of the largest motorcycling events in the world in terms of attendance and of significant economic importance to the area. In 2012 highlight for spectators was a display by an RAF Spitfire.

At the heart of the event were the sprint races and there were classes mainly for classic motorcycles but with some more-modern bikes. The races have attracted an entry list of notable stars, including Jim Redman, Giacomo Agostini, Sammy Miller, and more recent riders including James Toseland, Cal Crutchlow, Ryuichi Kiyonari, Chris Walker. Also, Top Gear's James May and Olympic athlete James Cracknell have ridden in the Thundersprint sprint races and cavalcade.

The Northwich time trials took place in a small town centre car park, so the scope of the racing was somewhat limited. Even so, the spectator attendance was large, as there was no entry cost and the event held appeal as a family day out. By 2013, the organisers found it too difficult to continue hosting a town-centre event, and the event moved to Anglesey's Trac Môn Circuit, North Wales. The 2013 Mona Thundersprint was not a great success because of torrential rain and the remote location from the Midlands.

In 2014, the Thundersprint moved to Derbyshire's Darley Moor circuit, which was at the time intended to become the event’s permanent home. Despite exceptionally heavy rain throughout the weekend, the event was a success; but the Mona and Darley Moor venues changed the event from an attractive and accessible free family event (as in Northwich) to a somewhat standard pay-to-enter motorcycle race meeting.

In 2015, the Mellings announced that " this iconic event will not take place in 2015", adding that "in the final analysis, we are a two person business and we can’t continue to risk what we have built up over the last seventeen years on the bet that we will have good weather in 2015". In 2016 Frank Melling confirmed that they "are not running any more Thundersprints".

== The Thunderfest ==
A companion event is the Thunderfest, first held in 2010. The events generally took place at Darley Moor but in 2015 it took place at the Anglesey Circuit. The event is a regularity trial where riders declare a target speed and then ride for 20 minutes plus two laps in an attempt to achieve it. The closeness to the target, not the actual speed, is the deciding factor. For example, a rider could declare a target of 61.15 mph and achieve 61.2 mph. He would beat a rider who declared 70 mph and then managed an average of 72 mph. This leads to the situation where riders of smaller, slower bikes can beat bigger and faster machines. The time trial demands a high degree of skill, without the intensity of flat-out racing. The event has attracted a number of classic bikes and has proved popular with spectators.

== Notable riders at the Thundersprint ==
- Cal Crutchlow
- Danny Webb
- Giacomo Agostini
- James Toseland
- James May
- Jonathan Rea
- Jim Redman
- Leon Haslam
- Ryuichi Kiyonari
- Sammy Miller
