= Joel Defries =

British-born presenter (born 1985)

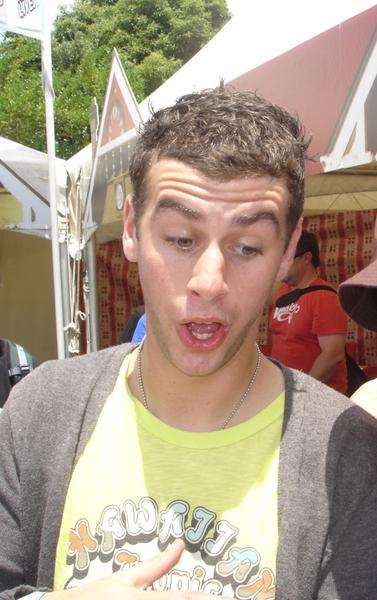
- Defries in 2007
- Born: 14 March 1985 (age 41); Hammersmith, London, England
- Occupations: Television and radio presenter
- Known for: Blue Peter presenter

Joel Nirmalan Defries (born 14 March 1985) is a British-born presenter, who worked on the BBC One children's programme Blue Peter from 2008 to 2010. He previously worked on the New Zealand television station, C4.

== Early life and education ==
Defries was born in Hammersmith, London. He was educated at Fortismere School, where he befriended Jess Glynne, and went to sixth form at Camden School for Girls.

== Career ==
Defries' New Zealand media career began at the alternative radio station Channel Z, before going on to host the music jukebox show Select Live. Defries presented a new New Zealand-based live music show called Live at Yours. He became a household name among young New Zealanders and saw a rapid rise in popularity. He also made a successful move into radio where he presented a Sunday morning show for the Edge called Joel's Take Out. He was a former presenter of Vodafone Select Live. Defries decided to return to the UK to take up other opportunities in radio and TV.

On 5 September 2008, it was announced that he would replace Gethin Jones as a presenter on the children's TV show Blue Peter, and joined the other members of the team, Andy Akinwolere and Helen Skelton, on 23 September 2008.

He went to Turkey with the Blue Peter team filming the 2009 Summer Expedition. The 2009/10 series of Blue Peter returned on 22 September 2009. Joel announced on 29 November 2010 that he would be leaving the show on 14 December 2010.

In 2010, Joel learnt to fly a hang glider for Blue Peter with Airways Airsports instructor Judy Leden MBE with the aim of flying with Lucy a peregrine falcon

During 2009, Defries presented the 26 episodes of the CBBC programme Keep Your Enemies Close, a children's game show that tests friends by wrenching them apart and forcing them to work with their rivals instead.

== Personal life ==
Defries is six feet tall exactly. He is Jewish, but says he is not religious and has only actually visited a synagogue twice. This was explored by the BBC during a Blue Peter episode titled "Joel's Journey" broadcast on 27 January 2009. It featured him exploring his Jewish heritage, and then looking at modern day Jewish life in the UK by spending time with a religious family. The climax of the programme was his visit to Auschwitz – where he met Freda Winemann – a Holocaust Survivor who was returning to Auschwitz for the first time.

Defries is a supporter of Fulham F.C.
