= Frank Melling =

British motoring journalist

- Occupations: Motorcyclist & Journalist
- Writing career
- Genres: Non-fiction history and technology
- Subjects: Automotive and motorcycling

Frank Melling is an English motoring journalist and author, based in northwest England. He is an accomplished motorcyclist and motorcycle racer who has competed in motocross, enduro and road racing events. He rode an exhibition lap at the Isle of Man TT in 2008 aboard a modern Ducati Classic.

Melling was the motorcycling contributor to the Daily Telegraph's Saturday Motoring section for a number of years, but was succeeded by Kevin Ash, who later died in a motorcycling accident. Melling is also the author of some 17 books on, among other things, motocross and enduro. His recent book, “A Penguin in a Sparrow’s Nest”, is a collection of motorbike-related autobiographical stories.

== The Thundersprint ==
Melling has organised a number of racing events and he is currently noted as the man behind the Thundersprint, an annual two-day event to celebrate motorcycling. The Thundersprint started in Lancashire but moved to Northwich, Cheshire, where it stayed for ten years. There was some time-trial racing which took place in a car park, and a Cavalcade through the town in which over 150 race and road bikes paraded on closed roads. It attracted big names such as Giacomo Agostini, Sammy Miller and Jim Redman. Spectator attendance was huge as there was no admission charge. By 2013, the organiser found it too difficult to continue hosting a town-centre event and the Thundersprint moved to Anglesey's "Mona" circuit but it was not a great success there because of adverse weather and the distance from the Midlands. The 2014 Thundersprint was held at Derbyshire's Darley Moor circuit where, despite exceptionally heavy rain, the weekend event was a success.

In 2016 Melling confirmed that he would not be running any more Thundersprints.

== The Thunderfest ==
A companion event is the Thunderfest, first held in 2010. The events generally took place at Darley Moor but in 2015 it took place at the Mona Circuit. The event is a regularity trial where riders declare a target speed and then ride for 20 minutes plus two laps in an attempt to achieve it.
