= Keep Your Enemies Close =

British children's game show

- Genre: Children's game show
- Presented by: Joel Defries
- Country of origin: United Kingdom

Production
- Running time: 24 minutes
- Production companies: Keep Your Productions; CBBC

Original release
- Network: CBBC
- Release: 9 October 2009 – 16 July 2010

Keep Your Enemies Close is a British children's game show that tests best friends by wrenching them apart and forcing them to keep their enemies close and work with their rivals instead. To get ahead, the friends must compete alongside their enemies and tackle challenges in the name of friendship. The two remaining teams will compete in the final. The loser gets covered in clag.

== Format ==
=== Starting game ===
The show begins with an introduction from Defries, who then lets four contestant teams of two best friends (dressed in blue, pink, purple, and silver shirts) out of "The Mixer" (a large carousel-like contraption at the center of the platform on the set). Each pair of contestants explains why they are best friends before playing the first game of the show, Tube Strike. The conceit of Tube Strike is for the two best friends to navigate a large clear balloon to the opposite end of the playing area, use the balloon to knock down a target illuminated in the team's colour, before returning to the center of the playing area to hit a red balloon (causing it to burst). The team who succeeds earns the "Hand of Friendship", an item that allows the team an advantage in the final round if they make it there.

=== Main games ===
Before the next challenge, Defries explains how the main game works: the eight contestants are randomly split into four groups of "frenemies" - pairs of contestants from different teams - by The Mixer, and then compete with one another in a challenge, typically a race to complete an objective. The group who performs the worst in the challenge or does not finish before the other groups will be put under "Lockdown", and prohibited from participating further. This continues for two more rounds, one with three pairs of frenemies, and one with two pairs. The last remaining pair is allowed to remove their teammates from Lockdown and will move on to the final round. The games played in these rounds are different from episode to episode. Before each game, Defries will comment on the pairs of frenemies generated by The Mixer and give his opinions on how each group might fare, and he gives a running commentary throughout the games.

==== Main round games ====
- Rip Off: The groups of frenemies must put on triangular costumes covered in smaller triangles, and work together to remove the smaller triangles from the suit. When they believe they are done, they must shout "Rip off!", where Defries will tell them if they have removed all the triangles or not.
- You Cube: The groups of frenemies will work to complete a six-piece cubical puzzle, of which three pieces have already been given. The pieces are fairly unwieldy and prone to jamming, requiring the frenemies to work together to secure them.
- In the Pipeline: Frenemies will work together to get a ball bearing through a clear pipe maze using a single magnet. Each group of frenemies is separated by a barrier, requiring them to pass the magnet to their partner to continue progress.
- Pump Action: Frenemies use a bike pump to inflate hand-shaped balloons until they burst open, and then attach the air hose from their pump to the next balloon in their set. After four balloons (the last of which is more durable than the rest), the team is finished.
- Gutted: Teams of frenemies will need to move a large gutter filled with large green and small orange balls in order to get the orange balls to a hole at the other end of the gutter. Four orange balls in the pocket of the gutter is the victory condition.
- Push On Through: Teams of frenemies will attempt to push large multicoloured pool noodles through a wall, one colour of noodles corresponding to their pair, while attempting to put noodles from opposing pairs of frenemies back in the wall. The team with the fewest noodles pushed through the wall at the end of 60 seconds is the losing team.

=== Final round ===
The final round is a best-of-11 quiz comparable to the final from Get Your Own Back, featuring both teams represented by the final pair of frenemies reunited and competing with each other. The two teams are situated in mine carts with six hands of varying colours placed in the tracks their carts are on, with a 5x5 grid of the letters "KEEPYOURENEMIESCLOSEFINAL" separate from this railway. On each team's turn, one letter on the grid will be illuminated and Defries will read out a category. The team who is playing will have five seconds to come up and say two correct answers - items within that category that start with the illuminated letter. If the team succeeds, their opponent will move one space down the track (knocking down a hand on their track in the process), and the team themselves will move down one space if they fail to come up with the requisite answers in time. If the team who won Tube Strike is present in the final, they may use the Hand of Friendship as an automatic correct answer by calling out "Hand of Friendship".

Whoever moves down six spaces and knocks over the final hand, the "clag barrier", is the loser, and the winning team gets to pull a lever that sends the losing team down the track. At the end of the track are chutes filled with "clag" (yellow/green gunge), which will be poured on the losing team as they pass under the chutes. The winning team receives silver hand-shaped medallions - one right, one left.

== Episodes ==
There are 26 episodes & 2 series altogether. These are the episodes.

=== Series 1 ===
1. Cassien & Alfie, Doreen & Amina, Thomas & Oliver and Abigail & Ceriane. “Clagged” Runners-up: Abigail & Ceriane, Winners: Cassien & Alfie
2. Joseph & Gareth, Harris & Govind, Najah & Kelsey and Sasha & Asal. “Clagged” Runners-up: Harris & Govind, Winners: Joseph & Gareth
3. Jazmin & Shanice, Alfie & Kipp, Grace & Maddie and Jeremy & Frazer. “Clagged” Runners-up: Jeremy & Frazer, Winners: Jazmin & Shanice
4. Jack & Grace, Joe & Sam, Hannah T & Hannah C and Abigail & Naomi. “Clagged” Runners-up: Hannah T & Hannah C, Winners: Joe & Sam
5. Curtis & Jamie, Ella & Kirsty, Charlie & Dorsa and Charlotte & Holly. “Clagged” Runners-up: Curtis & Jamie, Winners: Ella & Kirsty
6. Hannah & Ellie, Shravan & Francis, Zain & Glen and Sarah & Megan. “Clagged” Runners-up: Sarah & Megan, Winners: Zain & Glen
7. Joe & Daniel, Ellecia & Lydia, Nikisha & Dani Cherie and Megan & Callum. “Clagged” Runners-up: Megan & Callum, Winners: Joe & Daniel
8. Ruby & Shannon, Alicia & Klaudia, Jamie M & Owen and Oscar & Jamie F. “Clagged” Runners-up: Ruby & Shannon, Winners: Jamie M & Owen
9. Chloe & Aaron, Curtis & Sam, Alistair & Edan and Jessica & Sophie. “Clagged” Runners-up: Jessica & Sophie, Winners: Curtis & Sam
10. Jade & Danielle, Alex & Robert, Eliza & George and Navjoyt & Megha. “Clagged” Runners-up: Navjoyt & Megha, Winners: Alex & Robert
11. Kate & Bethany, Anna & Rachel, Zak & Harri and Ethan & Matthew. “Clagged” Runners-up: Ethan & Matthew, Winners: Zak & Harri
12. Tom & Megan, Carys & Ryan, Catriona & Natalie and Tyler & Rajkiran. “Clagged” Runners-up: Tom & Megan, Winners: Catriona & Natalie
13. Charlotte & Imogen, Enrico & Sam, Kane & Matthew and Jaye & Chloe. “Clagged” Runners-up: Enrico & Sam, Winners: Kane & Matthew

=== Series 2 ===
1. Leah & Lydia, Martin & Barnabas, Niamh & Carmen and Liam & Umar. “Clagged” Runners-up: Leah & Lydia, Winners: Liam & Umar
2. Ben & Seb, Daniel & Oisin, Millie & Kirsten and Sanya & Hadya. “Clagged” Runners-up: Ben & Seb, Winners: Millie & Kirsten
3. Chelsey & Rowan, Marshall & Jamie, Phoebe & Conor and Sam & Rhys. “Clagged” Runners-up: Phoebe & Conor, Winners: Chelsey & Rowan
4. Paul & Daniel, Peter & Victoria, Alice & Sophie and Claire & Amy. “Clagged” Runners-up: Claire & Amy, Winners: Peter & Victoria
5. George & Josh, Simon & Kevin, Bethany & Christy-Ann and Sophie & Lois. “Clagged” Runners-up: Sophie & Lois, Winners: Simon & Kevin
6. George & Ali, Ben & Joshua, Kayleigh & Savannah and Georgina & Meghan. “Clagged” Runners-up: Kayleigh & Savannah, Winners: Ben & Joshua
7. Gus & Alex, Rathuson & Taimur, Greta & Maria and Leo & Gaby. “Clagged” Runners-up: Greta & Maria, Winners: Gus & Alex
8. Niall & Conor, Kaisha & Ella, Jack & Bradley and Nicole & Eva. “Clagged” Runners-up: Nicole & Eva, Winners: Niall & Conor
9. James & Bradley, Emma & Sukyella, Liam & Elliot and Chloe & Dakshayeeni. “Clagged” Runners-up: Emma & Sukyella, Winners: Liam & Elliot
10. Barbara & Myfanwy, Mitchell & Dylan, Sam & Jack and Josephine & Kiera. “Clagged” Runners-up: Josephine & Kiera, Winners: Mitchell & Dylan
11. Bimal & Katie, Harry & Rhys, George & Nicos and Emily & Summer. “Clagged” Runners-up: Emily & Summer, Winners: Harry & Rhys
12. Luciana & Shaydie, Jacob & Cameron, Tanika & Laura and Connor & Alex. “Clagged” Runners-up: Luciana & Shaydie, Winners: Jacob & Cameron
13. Danielle & Mykelia, Lucas & Mark, Sophie B & Morgan and Sophie O & Tori. “Clagged” Runners-up: Sophie & Tori, Winners: Lucas & Mark
