= RAF Ashbourne =

Former Royal Air Force station in Derbyshire, England

RAF Ashbourne
- Near Ashbourne, Derbyshire in England

Site information
- Type: Royal Air Force station
- Code: AS
- Owner: Air Ministry
- Operator: Royal Air Force
- Controlled by: RAF Army Cooperation Command 1942-43; RAF Fighter Command 1943- * No. 38 Wing RAF * No. 38 (Airborne Forces) Group RAF

Location
- Shown within Derbyshire RAF Ashbourne (the United Kingdom)
- Coordinates: 53°00′25″N 001°42′25″W

Site history
- Built: 1942
- In use: July 1942-1954
- Battles/wars: European theatre of World War II

Airfield information
- Elevation: 590 feet (180 m) AMSL
Runways
Direction	Length and surface
02/20	1,460 metres (4,790 ft) Concrete
09/27	1,460 metres (4,790 ft) Concrete
14/32	2,370 metres (7,776 ft) Concrete

Royal Air Force Ashbourne or more simply RAF Ashbourne is a former Royal Air Force station located approximately 1 mile (1.6 km) south-east of the town of Ashbourne, Derbyshire, England.

It was opened on 12 June 1942, before closing on 23 August 1954.

== Construction ==
Construction of the airfield began in late 1941 to Class-A bomber standards comprising three paved runways (concrete and woodchip surface) in an "leaning A" formation, 30 "frying-pan" style hard standings, four T2 hangars, a control tower and assorted technical buildings. Although at 610 feet (190 m) AMSL the altitude of the area was above the ceiling height for construction of airfields, the necessity of defensive installations during the Second World War overrode this condition.

== History ==
Ashbourne was home to Armstrong Whitworth Whitley, Armstrong Whitworth Albemarle and Bristol Blenheim aircraft.

Originally planned as a satellite installation of RAF Seighford for Vickers Wellington bombers, due to the unsuitability of altitude and local weather it was relegated to a training role with its own satellite of RAF Darley Moor.

Post war it was used for storage and maintenance of ordnance where the bombs were stored along the runways.

== Based units ==
There were three small units in operation based at Ashbourne:

- Relief Landing Ground for No. 18 (Pilots) Advanced Flying Unit RAF (March 1945)
- No. 42 Operational Training Unit RAF (OTU) (October 1943)
- No. 81 OTU (July 1942 – January 1944)
- Sub site of No. 28 Maintenance Unit RAF (May 1945 – August 1954)

== Current use ==
The western half of the site is now an industrial estate, appropriately named Airfield Industrial Estate. The northern half has been used by JCB as a test and demonstration ground for various earth moving products but is now deserted. The north western part of the airfield is now a housing estate.

On the South-East side, part of one runway remains usable, and a 2017 document mentioned 5 aeroplanes based.

== See also ==
- List of former Royal Air Force stations
