= Airways Airsports =

Airpark in Derbyshire, England

Logo

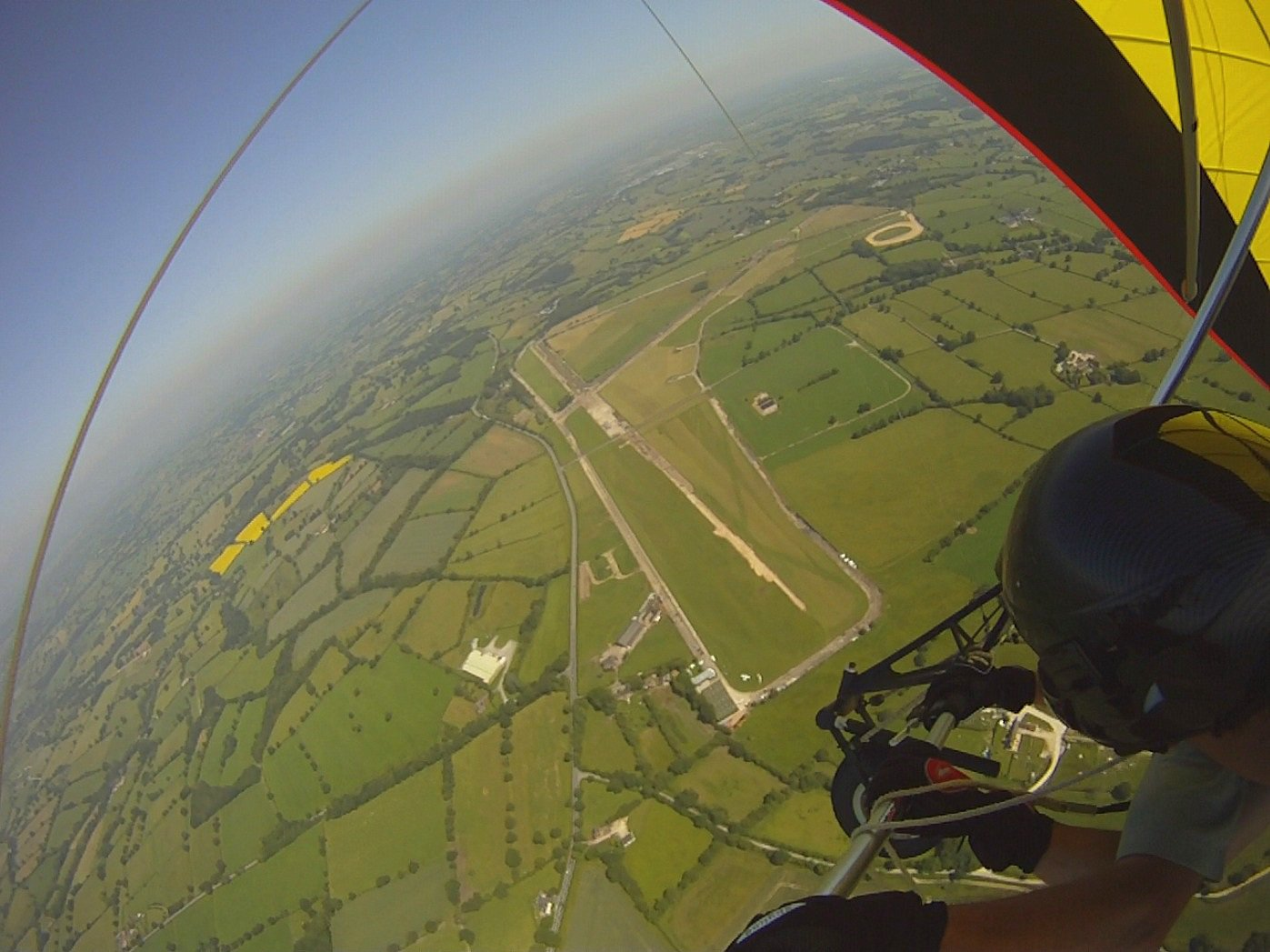
Darley Moor Airfield from above

Airways Airsports is an airpark at Darley Moor Airfield, Derbyshire, offering hang gliding, paragliding, paramotoring, and microlight training and flying. It is a British Hang Gliding and Paragliding Association and British Microlight Aircraft Association (BMAA) recognised school. Instructors include a three-times world champion, world record holders, British cross country champion, British distance record holder, Royal Aeroclub gold medal winner, and members of the British hang gliding and paragliding team.

Airways also teach paragliding, hang gliding, paramotoring, and microlight flying at BHPA and BMAA schools in the Alps.

== Teaching methods ==
=== Hang gliding ===
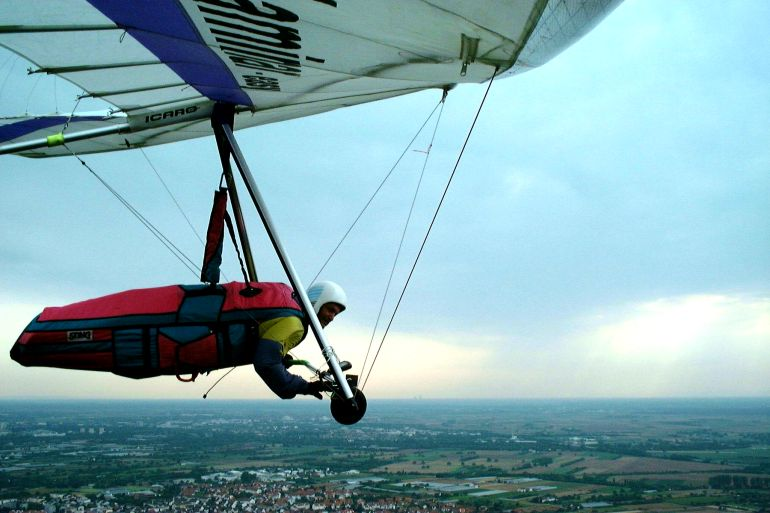
Hang glider in mid air.

Hang gliding teaching is primarily through tandem aerotow flights with take off and landing, both on wheels. The student and instructor clip into a tandem glider side by side and attach themselves and the glider to a tow line pulled by a high-powered 'tug' microlight. The tandem hang glider is then towed to around 3000' with the instructor and student keeping in line behind the microlight. At the top of the tow the line is released and the student is taken through a number of exercises before landing the glider under instruction. After the student has completed a number of exercises and demonstrated an ability to keep the glider in line behind the microlight on tow, and land safely, then the student progresses on to a solo, wheeled hang glider. Once a student has completed a number of solo flights and demonstrated safe tows and landings solo then they are awarded their Club Pilot Certificate (aerotow) and can progress to flying in a club rather than a school environment. Airways have developed a wheeled solo glider for the initial solo flights.

=== Paragliding ===
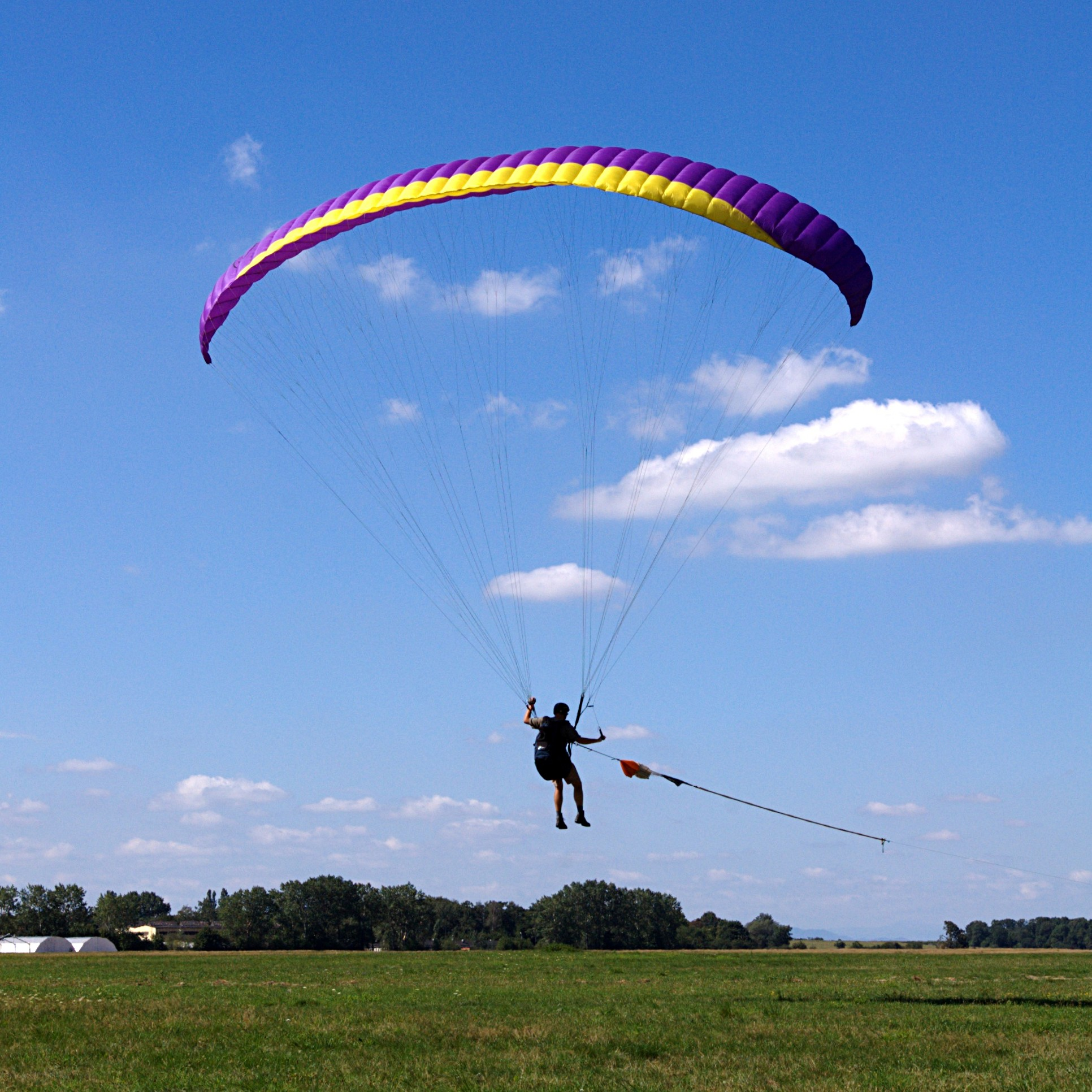
Paraglider towed launch

Airways train pilots using a static winch for paragliding training. Compared to training on the hill, this is a faster and less physically demanding way to try out paragliding, as Darley Moor airfield is big enough for the winch to be moved around if the wind changes.

The course or taster starts with a full demonstration/walkthrough of the equipment, the winch commands/release, etc. and how to use the radio. Students are then trained to ground-handle the wing, then the flying starts with some short low level flights before progressing to basic manoeuvres and on to high flying circuits.

=== Hill conversion ===
By using a combination of aerotow and winch for training, pilots gain the skills necessary for flying in a club environment with winch or aerotow launching. With a hill conversion course, pilots can be trained to fly from hills. Airways primarily use the Derbyshire Soaring Club sites. There are hills to suit all wind directions for both hang gliding and paragliding.

=== Paramotoring and powered hang gliding ===
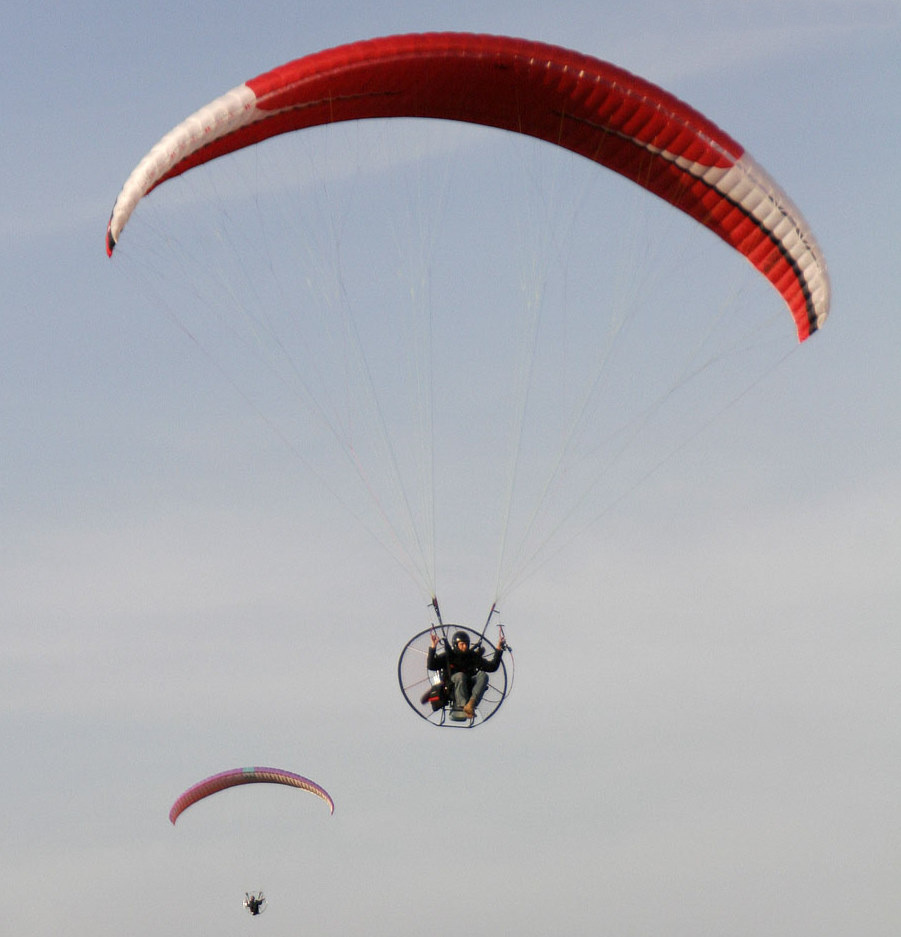
Two powered paragliders in flight

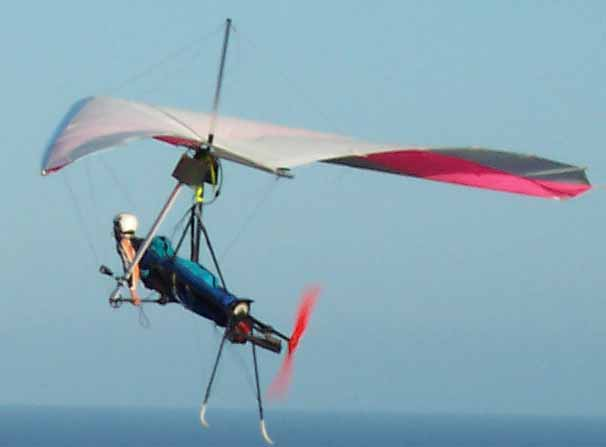
A powered hang glider

Paramotoring training starts with standard paragliding training on the winch before the introduction of the engine and training with power. Similarly, training for powered hang gliding involves learning to fly a hang glider first before conversion to power.

=== Single seat microlight flying ===
Either flying with a paragliding wing in a wheeled, powered buggy or in a single seat wheeled powered hang glider.

=== Microlighting ===
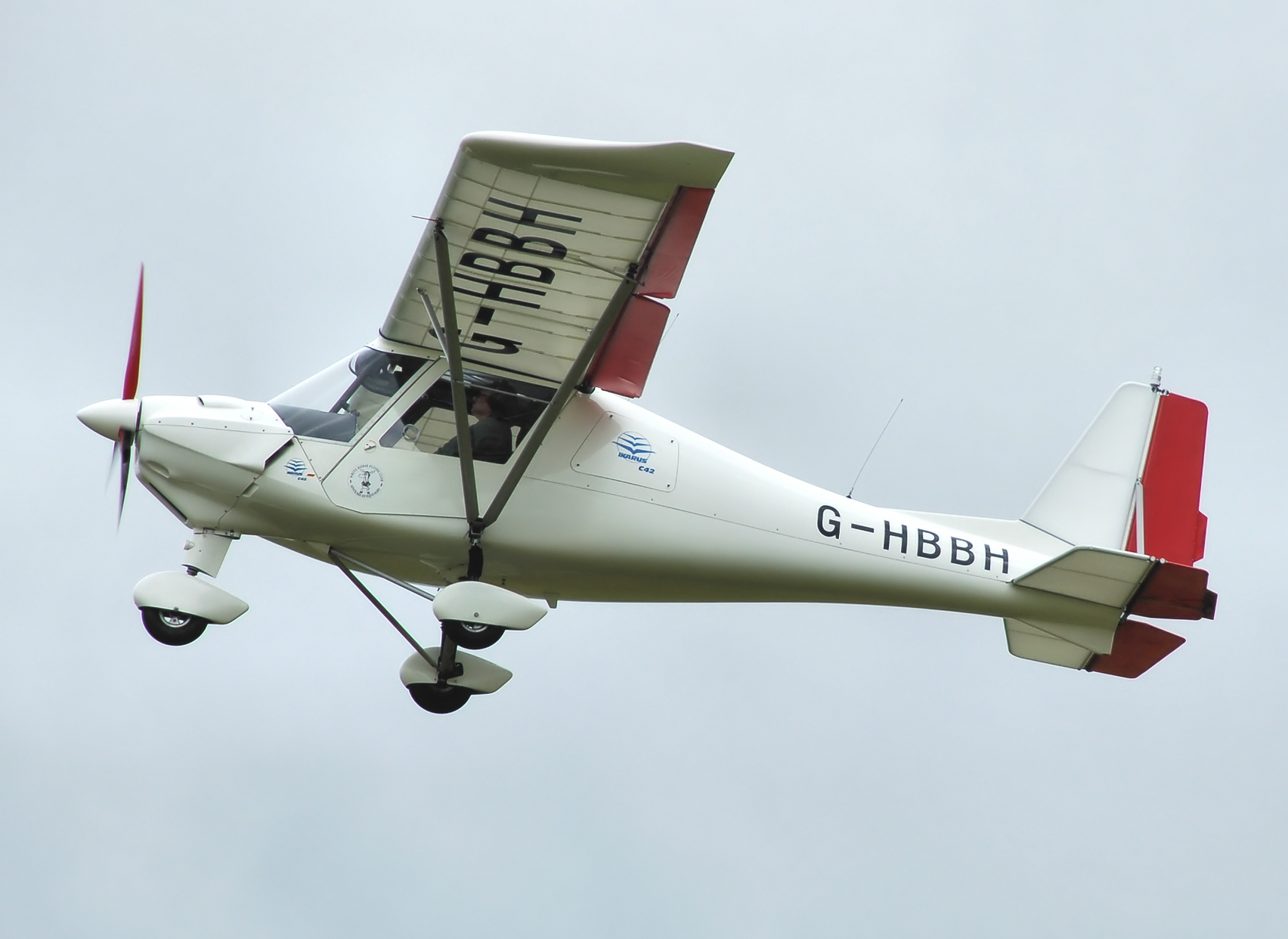
Ikarus C42, a German microlight

The school aircraft available for training are as follows;

- Fixed wing:
  - Ikarus C42 (3-Axis)
  - Snowbird (3-Axis modified to be fully flown with hand controls)

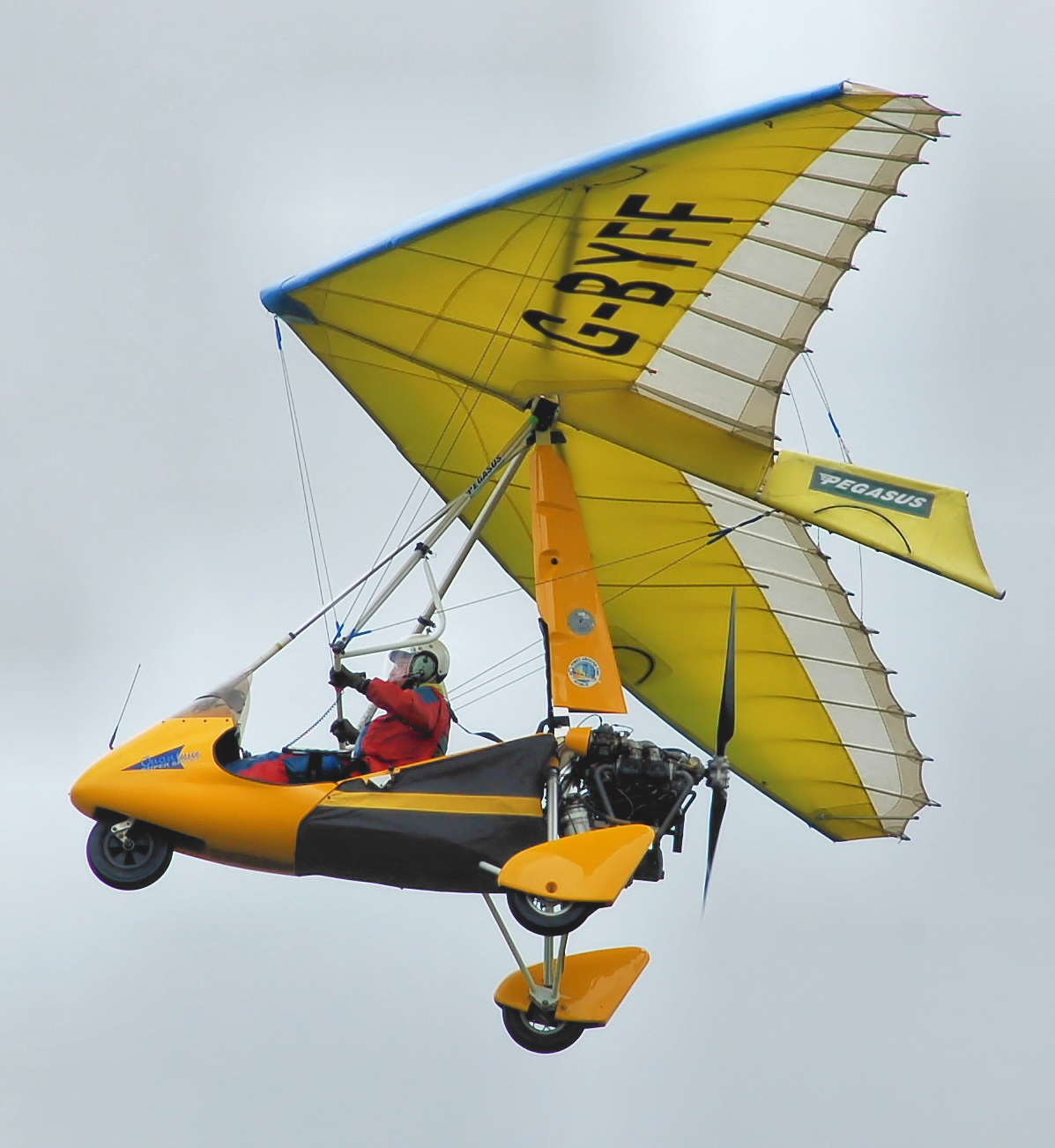
Pegasus Quantum 145-912 microlight trike

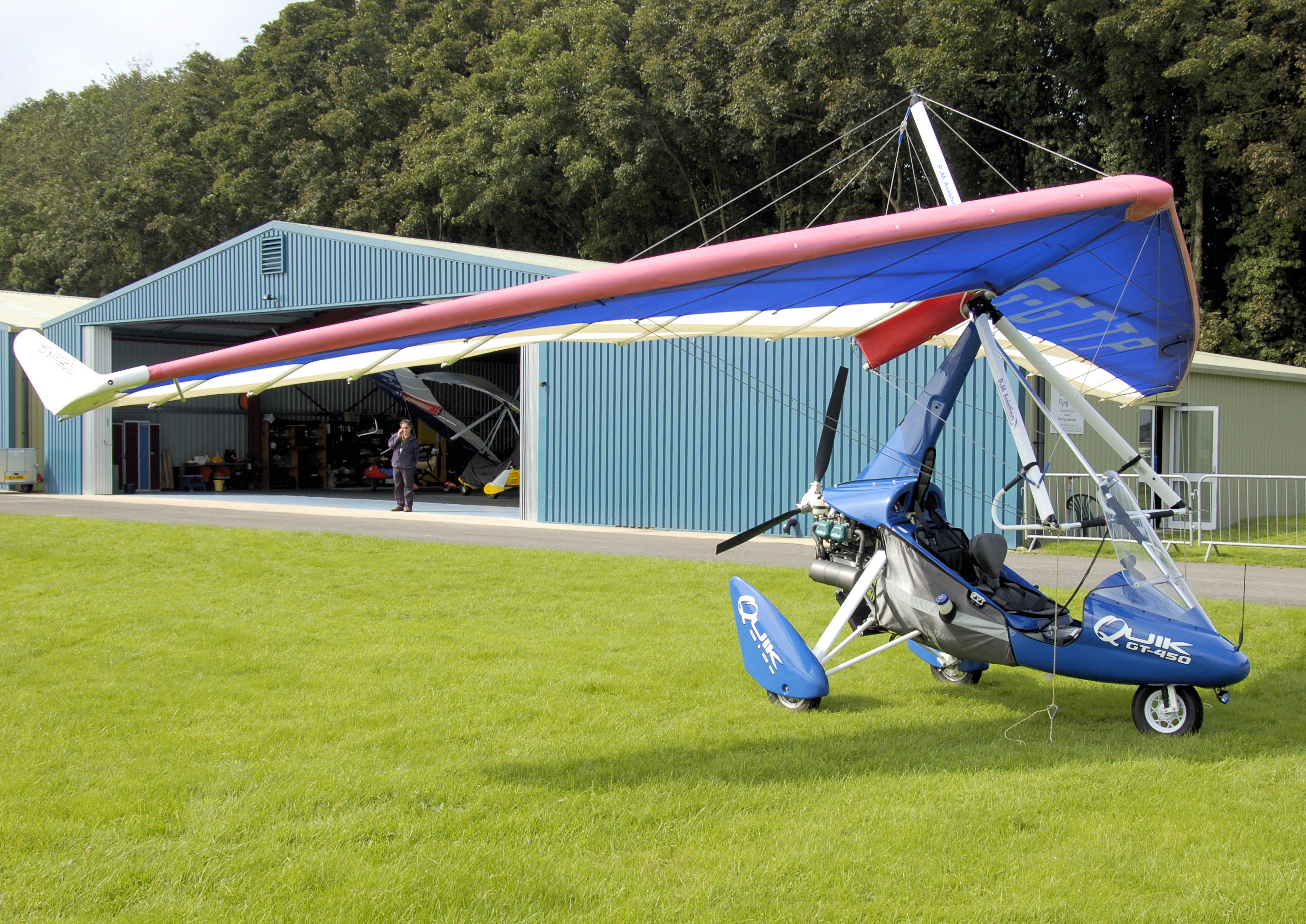
P and M Aviation Quik GT450 microlight

- Flex wing:
  - Quantum 912
  - GT450 (Flex-wing)

== Darley Moor Airfield facilities ==
The airfield has ample parking with full wheelchair and vehicle access. In the clubhouse there are male, female and disabled, showers, light refreshments, a shop, and in 2011 a brand new hangar has been built.

The school offers the widest range of disabled free flight facilities of any school in the UK, using specially modified equipment to fly hang gliders, paragliders, and microlight aircraft. The school has close links with the Aerobility (formerly the British Disabled Flying Association) and Flyability – charities offering support, advice and scholarships to disabled people wishing to experience or learn to fly.

== Media coverage ==
Airways Airsports has been chosen by the press to fly or teach presenters and journalists

(2003) Blue Peter presenter Matt Baker taught to fly and makes successful tandem world record breaking flight with Airways instructor Judy Leden.

(2006) An extract from BBC's Great British Summer. Airways instructor Judy Leden flying Tandem with Cloud Appreciation Society founder Gavin Pretor-Pinney, showing him what its like to fly through the clouds on a hang glider.

(2010) Geologist Iain Stewart flown over a waterfall in a paramotor buggy by Airways CFI Chris Dawes.

(2010) Country Tracks presenter Ellie Harrison flew above Derbyshire with Airways instructor Andy Snell.

(2010) Blue Peter presenter Joel Defries learnt to fly with Airways instructor Judy Leden with the aim of flying with Lucy the peregrine falcon.

(2010) BBC Breakfast sports presenter Mike Bushell and BBC Disability Sport reporter Tony Garrett flew tandem with Airways instructor Judy Leden to experience hang gliding and to demonstrate the benefits of aerotowing for disabled students.

(2011) The Gadget Show presenter, Jon Bentley, flew with Judy Leden, competing with a peregrine falcon to track a lure

(2011) Judy Leden takes BBC Breakfast Weather reporter Carol Kirkwood flying in a hang glider to see a cloud close up and weight it, for BBC's The Great British Weather Show.

(2011) Gethin Jones gets taken up flying in a microlight by Airways CFI Chris Dawes in a microlight for ITV's "The Adventurer's Guide to Britain", to get a unique birds eye view of the Peak District.
