= Judy Leden =

British hang glider and paraglider

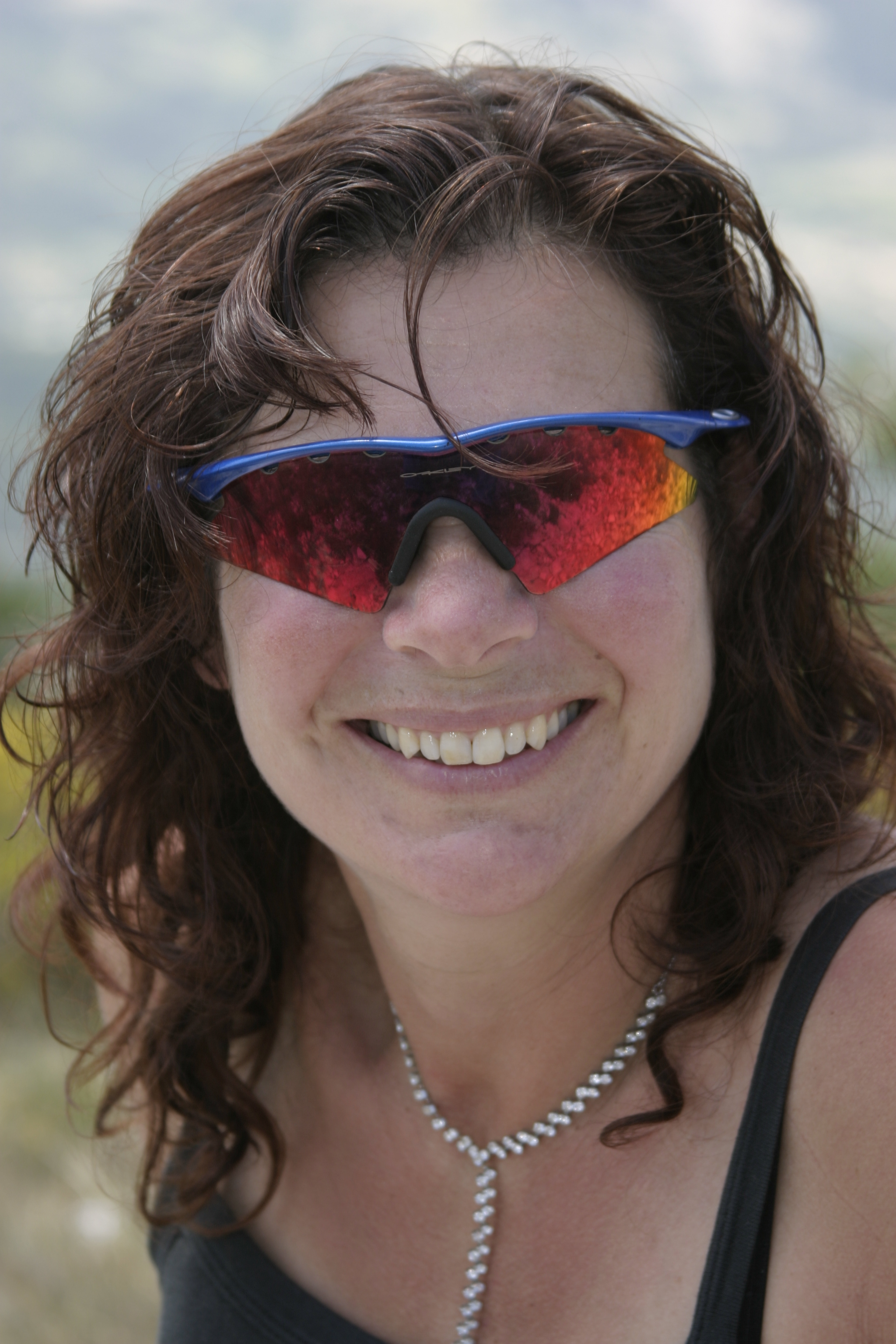
- Born: 1959 (age 66–67); London
- Spouse: Chris Dawes
- Relatives: Yasmin (daughter); Cameron (son)
- Awards: MBE. Royal Aero Club Gold Medal. Hussein Medal for Excellence. Star of the First Order.
- Aviation career
- Famous flights: Crossing English Channel in hang glider. Dropped from a balloon from 40,000ft over Jordan.
- Website: Judyleden.com

Judy Leden, MBE (born 1959) is a British hang glider and paraglider pilot. She has held three world champion titles, twice in hang gliding, once in paragliding.

== Biography ==
Judy Leden's flying career began while she was at university in Cardiff in 1979. She started competing in 1982 and broke many records in 1983. She currently holds world records for both hang gliding and paragliding. Leden turned professional in 1988, becoming the only woman to earn a living as a hang glider and paraglider pilot. Her work includes films, stunts, flying displays, teaching and writing. She is a friend and supporter of Flyability, the BHPA charity to help disabled people to fly hang gliders and paragliders.

As a display pilot, Leden has been asked to take part in a range of airshows. She was asked to fly at the Imperial War Museum display at Duxford as part of their 2011 Spring Air Show themed Celebrating Women in Aviation. Unfortunately the strong winds made conditions unsafe for flying hang gliders.

Leden has landed many sponsorship deals, including Citroën. Her competitive success includes winning the Women's World Hang Gliding Championships in 1987 and again in 1991. She has been British Women's Champion six times and in 1995 she won the Women's World Paragliding Championship. Involved at Airways Airsports from the start, Leden is the senior instructor proficient in every form of free flying.

Leden's father was one of the Ashkenazi Jewish children (of Czech Jewish origin) saved by Sir Nicholas Winton prior to the outbreak of World War II. She took Winton flying in a microlight on a number of occasions including his 98th and 100th birthdays.

== Achievements ==
In 1989 Leden became the first woman to fly over the English Channel by hang glider following a launch from a hot air balloon at 13,000 feet. The flight received substantial press attention and was featured in an episode of Spitting Image.

For the Channel 4 documentary Cotopaxi Dream she climbed and flew from the top of Cotapaxi, at 19,600 feet the world's tallest active volcano.

In early 1992 Leden took part in the Flight of the Dacron Eagles, a 1000-mile, three-week microlight and hang glider expedition down the rift valley in Kenya, filming for the BBC 1 Classic Adventure series with cameramen Sid Perou, microlight pilots Richard Meredith-Hardy and Ben Ashman and hang glider pilots Mark Dale, Tim Hudson and Louise Anderton.

Leden undertook the "Flight for Life" flight from London to Amman, Jordan, for a cancer research campaign with Ben Ashman, which was inspired by—and in memory of—hang glider pilot Yasmin Saudi, who died of cancer at the age of 24. The flight succeeded in raising over £100,000, and it was filmed en route and released as a video.

In 1996, Leden's autobiography Flying with Condors was published. This title was also used for a BBC 1 Natural World documentary in which Leden and her husband Chris Dawes travelled to Patagonia to fly with Andean condors using hang gliders, paragliders and paramotors.

Leden's wide experience with various aircraft, adventurous nature and low body weight has resulted in her being asked to test fly a number of unique aircraft. In 2003, she was asked to test fly a replica of a Leonardo da Vinci glider and in 2009 the makers of a replica of the first aircraft to fly in the UK recruited Leden in an attempt to get their replica Roe Triplane airborne.

=== Awards ===
Leden was awarded an MBE in 1989 for her services to hang gliding, and has received many other awards, including the Royal Aero Club Gold Medal for 1995, and Sportswoman of the Year from Cosmopolitan magazine and Middlesex county. She also received the Hussein Medal for Excellence in recognition of her flight to Jordan by microlight, and the Order of the Star of Jordan (First Class) by King Hussein.

=== Records ===
Date	Class	UK/worldwide	Record	Notes
15 June 1983	HG	W	Out and return distance	82.04 km at Owens Valley, USA. (Feminine World, National)
13 July 1983	HG	W	Straight distance	233 km. (Feminine World, National)
28 April 1989	HG	UK	Open distance	114 miles from Wether Fell to Lincolnshire.
14 January 1990	HG	W	Distance with one turn point	81.72 km at Forbes, Australia. (Feminine World, National)
22 January 1990	HG	W	Distance with one turn point	170 km at Forbes, Australia. (All Feminine World, National)
24 January 1990	HG	W	Speed over triangular course of 25 km	16.67 km/h at Forbes, Australia.
22 June 1991	HG	W	Triangular course	114.107 km at Kossen, Austria. (Feminine World, National)
1 January 1992	HG	W	Height gain	3970 metres at Kuruman, South Africa. (Feminine World, National)
25 October 1994	HG	W	Altitude record for a hang glider release from a balloon	Taking off from Wadi Rum, Jordan, Leden was flown to an altitude of 41,300 feet (12390m) by world class balloonist Per Lindstrand. This flight was filmed for the Discovery documentary Stratosfear by Matt Dickinson
12 January 1997	HG	W	Tandem flight to goal	Steve Varden and Leden made flight to goal of 36.3 km from Kuruman, South Africa (Multiplace World, National)
15 October 2002	HG	UK	Tandem hang glider tow record	Aerotow to over 11,000 feet. Her partner for the flight was Blue Peter presenter Matt Baker.
11 April 2003	PG	UK	Straight distance (F)	94.4 km, Bradwell Edge to Grasby, Ozone Vulcan
17 March 2004	PG	UK	Straight distance (F)	125.0 km, Bradwell Edge to Spilsby, Ozone Vibe
9 December 1992	PG	W	Straight distance (F)	128.5 km, Vryburg (South Africa) to, Firebird Apache
20 July 1994	PG	W	Distance around a triangular course (F)	Sarah Fenwick, Judy Leden, 50.3 km, Piedrahita, Nova Sphinx & Edel Rainbow
20 July 1994	PG	W	Speed over a triangular course of 50 km (F)	Piedrahita, 15.8 km/h, 20 July 1994, Edel Rainbow

== Media appearances ==
(1989) ITN news reports on crossing the English Channel landing on the beach at Calais.

(1991) Cotopaxi Dream Channel 4 documentary. The first ever hang glider flight from one of the world's highest active volcanoes – Cotopaxi in Ecuador, which rises 19,600 feet.

(1992) Flight of Dacron Eagles BBC 1 Classic Adventure series

(1994) Stratosfear - Discovery Channel documentary on breaking the world altitude record for a hang glider release from a balloon taking off from Wadi Rum, Jordan to an altitude of 41,300 feet

Don't Try This at Home - tandem hang glider flight from a mountain

(1999) Scrapheap Challenge Series 2, Episode 1 "Flying Machine".

(2003) Woman's Hour - two interviews with presenter Jenni Murray discussing Leonardo's Dream Machine and flying with Sir Nicholas Winton

(2003) Blue Peter presenter Matt Baker taught to fly & makes successful tandem world record breaking flight with Airways instructor Judy Leden.

(2005) BBC 1 Natural World documentary Flying with Condors using hang gliders, paragliders and paramotors.

(2006) An extract from BBC's Great British Summer. Airways instructor Judy Leden flying Tandem with Cloud Appreciation Society founder Gavin Pretor-Pinney, showing him what its like to fly through the clouds on a hang glider.

(2010) Blue Peter presenter Joel Defries learnt to fly with Airways instructor Judy Leden with the aim of flying with Lucy the peregrine falcon.

(2010) BBC Breakfast sports presenter Mike Bushell and BBC Disability Sport reporter Tony Garrett flew tandem with Airways instructor Judy Leden to experience hang gliding and to demonstrate the benefits of aerotowing for disabled students.

(2011) The Gadget Show presenter, Jon Bentley, flew with Judy Leden, competing with a peregrine falcon to track a lure.

(2011) Judy Leden took BBC Breakfast Weather reporter Carol Kirkwood flying in a hang glider to see a cloud close up and weigh it, for BBC's The Great British Weather Show.

(2014) TEDx Talk: Putting the F into Future: Judy Leden at TEDxHurstpierpointCollege
