= Select Live =

- Select Live Logo
- Presented by: Drew Neemia
- Country of origin: New Zealand
- Original language: English

Production
- Running time: 120 - 180 minutes

Original release
- Network: C4
- Release: 2003 – 2010

Select Live and Select are music video request shows that screened every day on the C4 music channel in New Zealand. The shows operated for fifty weeks a year from 2003 to 2010, with videos added to the playlist each week.

The original format show, Select, originally played every day from 4:00pm to 7:00pm but later only aired on weekend days during this timeslot. This show did not have a presenter; special "text codes" scrolled along the bottom of the screen and corresponded to a particular song.

The Select Live format screened weekdays from 4:00pm to 6:00pm. Songs to be played were requested by sending an SMS message of a particular format to a designated number. The show was hosted by Joel Defries from 2005 until August 3, 2007, then by Jermaine Leef until 2008, then by Drew Neemia until 2011. It was initially sponsored by Vodafone and broadcast as Vodafone Select Live.

Regular segments featured on the live screenings of the show include Under Drew's Hat, which features celebrity gossip and news, Top 5, which screens on Fridays, featuring the songs most voted for on the show and the "Mattle" with Drew Neemia versus C4's Matt in a battle of music videos for viewers to vote for.

The show was cancelled on 4 February 2010 when C4 was moved to Freeview to make way for FOUR; retro video shuffle C42 replaced it on the programming schedule. A similar format show was introduced on FOUR, initially called Drew and Shannon Live and later called FOUR Live.
