= Classic Adventure =

1982 video game

- Developer: Abersoft
- Publisher: Abersoft
- Platforms: Amstrad CPC, BBC Micro, Commodore 16, Plus/4, Commodore 64, Electron, MSX, ZX81, ZX Spectrum
- Release: 1982
- Genre: Adventure

Classic Adventure, also known as Adventure 1, is a fantasy text-based video game released by Abersoft in 1982. It was originally released as Adventure 1 on the ZX Spectrum in 1982 before being changed to Classic Adventure in 1984-1985 and re-released on more platforms.

Classic Adventure is a remake of the 1976 text adventure game Colossal Cave Adventure.

== Gameplay ==
As a text based game it starts with the opening "You are standing at the end of a road before a small brick building. Around you is a forest. A small stream flows out of the building and down a gully". From here it is up to the player to decide how to explore the caves in the game. There are obstacles that must be overcome and treasure to bring back to the house.
