= Hang gliding =

Unpowered glider air sport

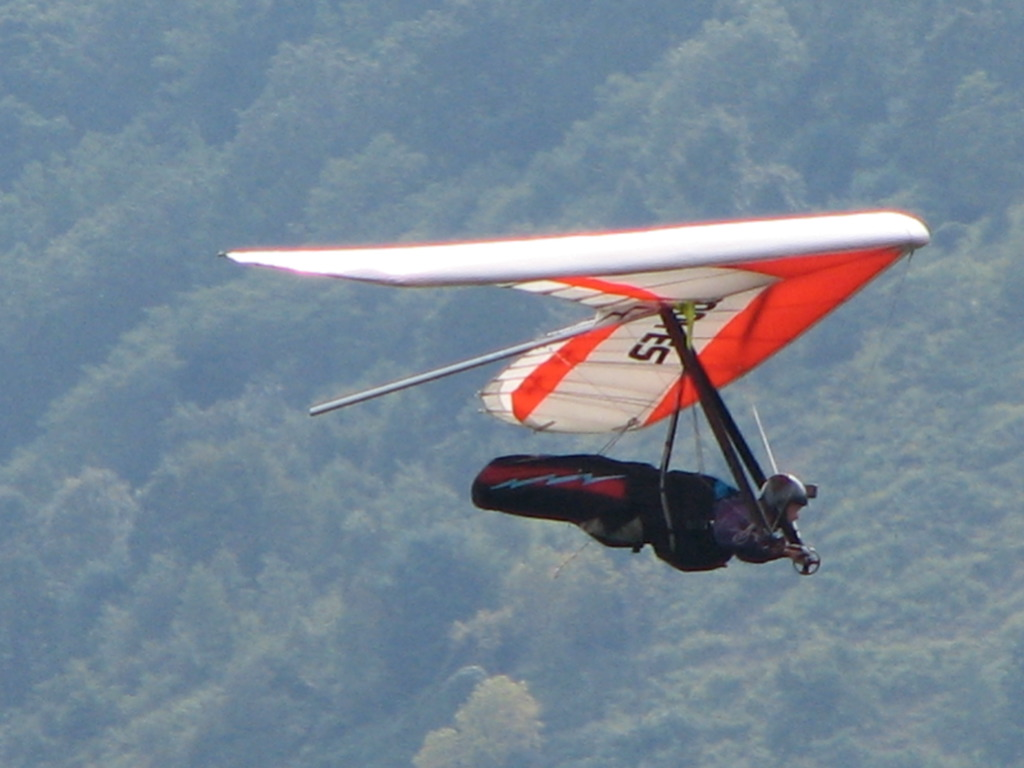
Hang glider just after launch from Salève, France

Hang gliding is an air sport or recreational activity in which a pilot flies a light, non-motorised, fixed-wing heavier-than-air aircraft called a hang glider. Most modern hang gliders are made of an aluminium alloy or composite frame covered with synthetic sailcloth to form a wing. Typically the pilot is in a harness suspended from the airframe, and controls the aircraft by shifting body weight in opposition to a control frame.

Early hang gliders had a low lift-to-drag ratio, so pilots were restricted to gliding down small hills. By the 1980s this ratio significantly improved, and since then pilots have been able to soar for hours, gain thousands of meters of altitude in thermal updrafts, perform aerobatics, and glide cross-country for hundreds of kilometers. The Federation Aeronautique Internationale and national airspace governing organisations control some regulatory aspects of hang gliding. Obtaining the safety benefits of being instructed is highly recommended and indeed a mandatory requirement in many countries.

== History ==
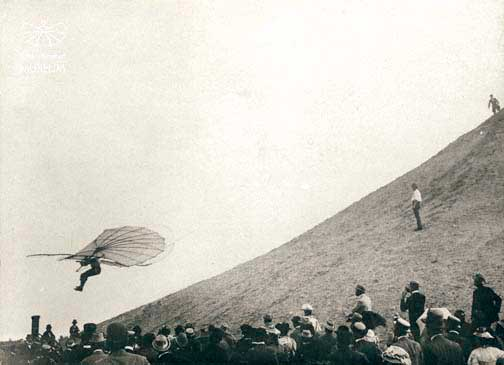
Otto Lilienthal in flight

In 1853, George Cayley invented a slope-launched, piloted glider. Most early glider designs were not conducive to safe flight; the problem was that early flight pioneers did not sufficiently understand the underlying principles that made a bird's wing work. Starting in the 1880s, technical and scientific advancements were made that led to the first truly practical gliders, such as those developed in the United States by John Joseph Montgomery. Otto Lilienthal built controllable gliders in the 1890s, with which he could ridge soar. His rigorously documented work influenced later designers, making Lilienthal one of the most influential early aviation pioneers. His aircraft was controlled by weight shift and is similar to a modern hang glider.

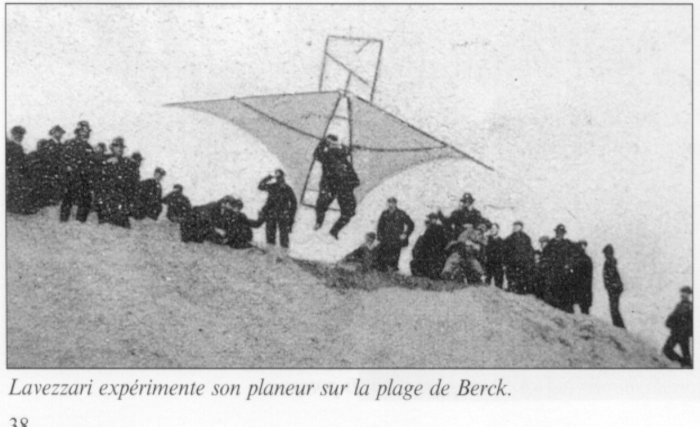
Jan Lavezzari with a double sail glider

Hang gliding saw a stiffened flexible wing hang glider in 1904, when Jan Lavezzari flew a double lateen sail hang glider off Berck Beach, France. In 1910 in Breslau, the triangle control frame with hang glider pilot hung behind the triangle in a hang glider, was evident in a gliding club's activity. The biplane hang glider was very widely publicized in public magazines with plans for building; such biplane hang gliders were constructed and flown in several nations since Octave Chanute and his tailed biplane hang gliders were demonstrated. In April 1909, a how-to article by Carl S. Bates proved to be a seminal hang glider article that seemingly affected builders even of contemporary times. Many builders would have their first hang glider made by following the plan in his article. Volmer Jensen with a biplane hang glider in 1940 called VJ-11 allowed safe three-axis control of a foot-launched hang glider.

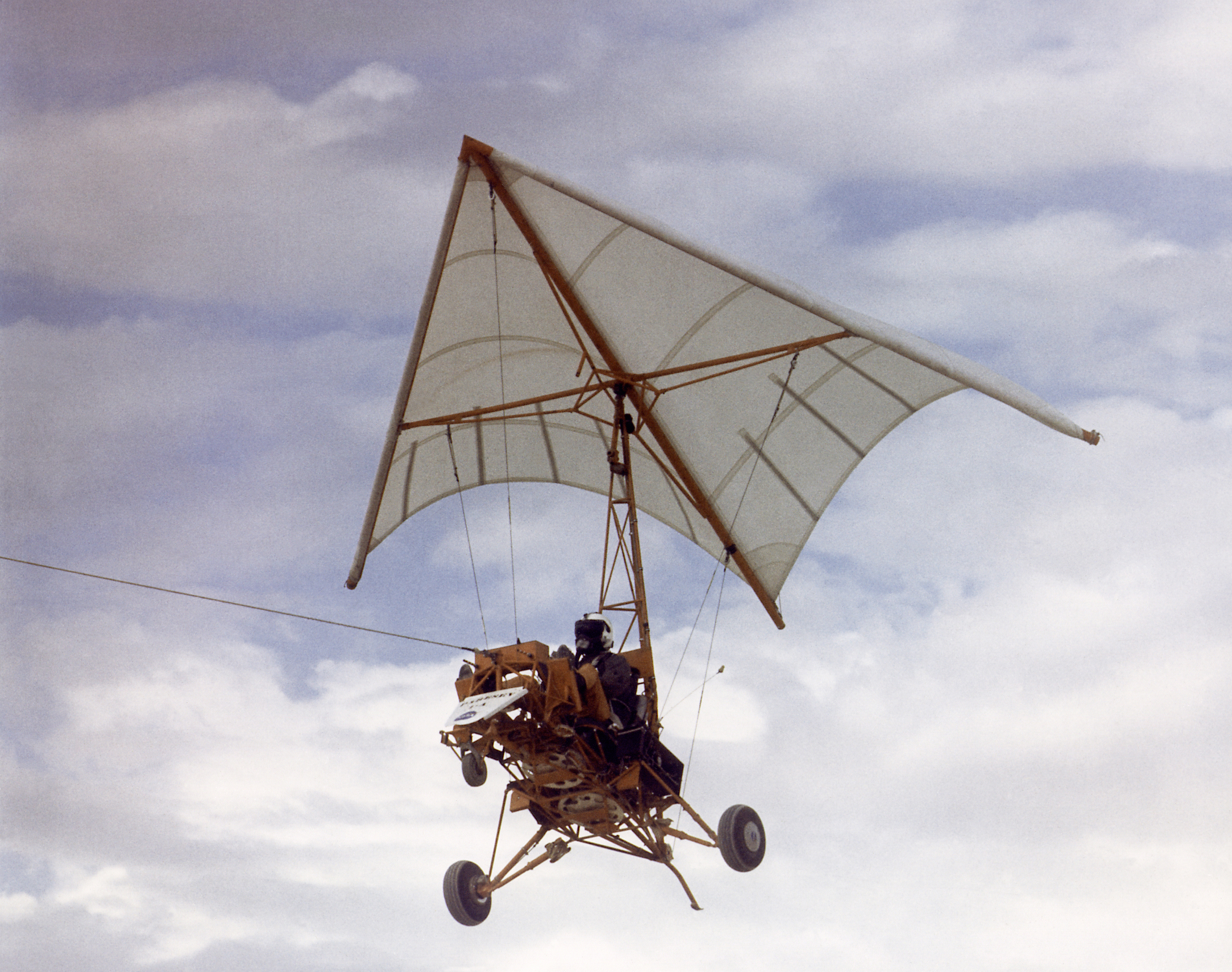
NASA's Paresev glider in flight with tow cable

On 23 November 1948, Francis Rogallo and Gertrude Rogallo applied for a kite patent for a fully flexible kited wing with approved claims for its stiffenings and gliding uses; the flexible wing or Rogallo wing, which in 1957 the American space agency NASA began testing in various flexible and semi-rigid configurations in order to use it as a recovery system for the Gemini space capsules. The various stiffening formats and the wing's simplicity of design and ease of construction, along with its capability of slow flight and its gentle landing characteristics, did not go unnoticed by hang glider enthusiasts. In 1960–1962 Barry Hill Palmer adapted the flexible wing concept to make foot-launched hang gliders with four different control arrangements. In 1963 Mike Burns adapted the flexible wing to build a towable kite-hang glider he called Skiplane. In 1963, John W. Dickenson adapted the flexible wing airfoil concept to make another water-ski kite glider; for this, the Fédération Aéronautique Internationale vested Dickenson with the Hang Gliding Diploma (2006) for the invention of the "modern" hang glider. Since then, the Rogallo wing has been the most used airfoil of hang gliders.

== Components ==
Hang gliding

=== Hang glider sailcloth ===
Hang glider sailcloth is normally made from woven or laminated fiber, such as dacron or mylar, respectively.

Woven polyester sailcloth is a very tight weave of small diameter polyester fibers that has been stabilized by the hot-press impregnation of a polyester resin. The resin impregnation is required to provide resistance to distortion and stretch. This resistance is important in maintaining the aerodynamic shape of the sail. Woven polyester provides the best combination of light weight and durability in a sail, with the best overall handling qualities.

Laminated sail materials using polyester film achieve superior performance by using a lower stretch material that is better at maintaining sail shape, but is still relatively light in weight. The disadvantages of polyester film fabrics are that the reduced elasticity under load generally results in stiffer and less responsive handling, and polyester laminated fabrics are generally not as durable or long-lasting as the woven fabrics.

=== Triangle control frame ===
In most hang gliders, the pilot is ensconced in a harness suspended from the airframe, and exercises control by shifting body weight in opposition to a stationary control frame, also known as a triangle control frame, or an A-frame. The control frame normally consists of 2 "down-tubes" and a control bar/base bar/base-tube. Either end of the control bar is attached to an upright tube or a more aerodynamic strut (a "down-tube"), where both extend from the base-tube and are connected to the apex of the control frame/ the keel of the glider. This creates the shape of a triangle or 'A-frame'. In many of these configurations additional wheels or other equipment can be suspended from the bottom bar or rod ends.

Images showing a triangle control frame on Otto Lilienthal's 1892 hang glider shows that the technology of such frames has existed since the early design of gliders, but he did not mention it in his patents. A control frame for body weight shift was also shown in Octave Chanute's designs. It was a major part of the now common design of hang gliders by George A. Spratt from 1929. The most simple A-frame that is cable-stayed was demonstrated in a Breslau gliding club hang gliding meet in a battened wing foot-launchable hang glider in the year 1908 by W. Simon; hang glider historian Stephan Nitsch has collected instances also of the U control frame used in the first decade of the 1900s; the U is variant of the A-frame.

== Training and safety ==
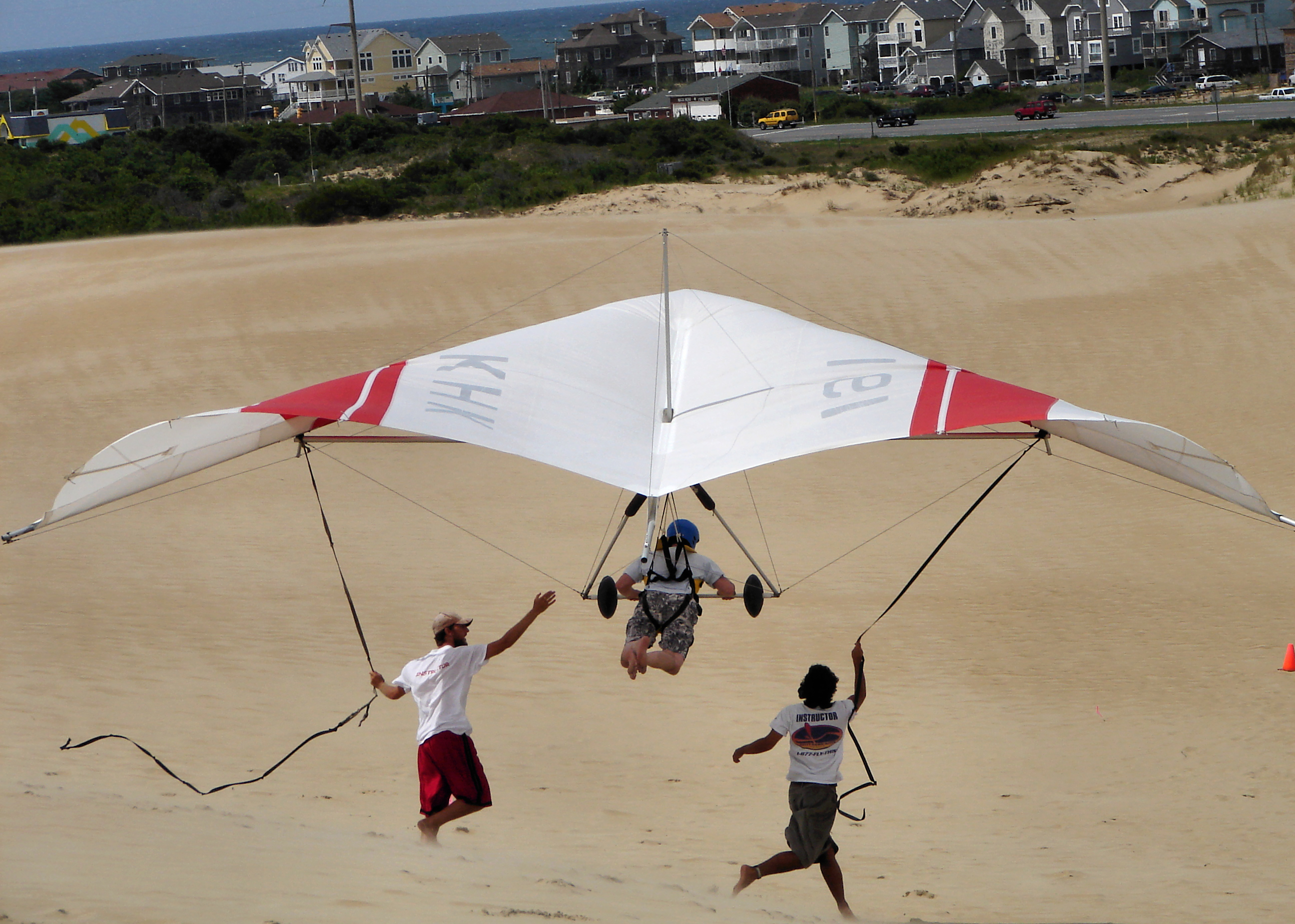
Learning to hang glide

Due to the poor safety record of early hang gliding pioneers, the sport has traditionally been considered unsafe. Advances in pilot training and glider construction have led to a much improved safety record. Modern hang gliders are very sturdy when constructed to Hang Glider Manufacturers Association, BHPA, Deutscher Hängegleiterverband, or other certified standards using modern materials. Although lightweight, they can be easily damaged, either through misuse or by continued operation in unsafe wind and weather conditions. All modern gliders have built-in dive recovery mechanisms such as luff lines in kingposted gliders, or "sprogs" in topless gliders.

Pilots fly in harnesses that support their bodies. Several different types of harnesses exist. At least one set of hang glider construction plans (Hall's Hawk) had instructions for constructing a harness. Pod harnesses are put on like a jacket and the leg portion is behind the pilot during launch. Once in the air the feet are tucked into the bottom of the harness. They are zipped up in the air with a rope and unzipped before landing with a separate rope. A cocoon harness is slipped over the head and lies in front of the legs during launch. After takeoff, the feet are tucked into it and the back is left open. A knee hanger harness is also slipped over the head but the knee part is wrapped around the knees before launch and just pick up the pilots leg automatically after launch. A supine or suprone harness is a seated harness. The shoulder straps are put on before launch and after takeoff the pilot slides back into the seat and flies in a seated position.

Pilots carry a parachute enclosed in the harness. In case of serious problems, the parachute is manually deployed (either by hand or with a ballistic assist) and carries both pilot and glider down to earth. Pilots also wear helmets and generally carry other safety items such as knives (for cutting their parachute bridle after impact or cutting their harness lines and straps in case of a tree or water landing), light ropes (for lowering from trees to haul up tools or climbing ropes), radios (for communication with other pilots or ground crew), and first-aid equipment.

The accident rate from hang glider flying has been dramatically decreased by pilot training. Early hang glider pilots learned their sport through trial and error and gliders were sometimes home-built. Training programs have been developed for today's pilot with emphasis on flight within safe limits, as well as the discipline to cease flying when weather conditions are unfavorable, for example: excess wind or risk cloud suck.

In the UK, a 2011 study reported there is one death per 116,000 flights, a risk comparable to sudden cardiac death from running a marathon or playing tennis. An estimate of worldwide mortality rate is one death per 1,000 active pilots per year.

Most pilots learn at recognised courses which lead to the internationally recognised International Pilot Proficiency Information card issued by the FAI.

== Launch ==
Video of a foot-launching from a hill

Launch techniques include launching from a hill/cliff/mountain/sand dune/any raised terrain on foot, tow-launching from a ground-based tow system, aerotowing (behind a powered aircraft), powered harnesses, and being towed up by a boat. Modern winch tows typically utilize hydraulic systems designed to regulate line tension, this reduces scenarios for lock out as strong aerodynamic forces will result in additional rope spooling out rather than direct tension on the tow line. Other more exotic launch techniques have also been used successfully, such as hot air balloon drops from very high altitude. When weather conditions are unsuitable to sustain a soaring flight, this results in a top-to-bottom flight and is referred to as a "sled run". In addition to typical launch configurations, a hang glider may be so constructed for alternative launching modes other than being foot launched; one practical avenue for this is for people who physically cannot foot-launch.

Launches by towing seem to have started in England after 1975, with national tow meets held in 1979 in Norfolk and Suffolk. The hang gliders attached to a payout winch mounted on a car or trailer, initially without a bridle and requiring intensive steering. One fatality occurred. Various bridles and motorized winches were tried. The British Hang Gliding Association imposed a temporary local ban on towing. By 1983 hundreds of tow launches to about 1000 ft had been accomplished. The bridle of choice had the top going to the heart bolt and the bottom to the pilot's hips.

In 1983 Denis Cummings in Australia re-introduced a safe tow system that was designed to tow through the centre of mass and had a gauge that displayed the towing tension, it also integrated a 'weak link' that broke when the safe tow tension was exceeded. After initial testing, in the Hunter Valley, Denis Cummings, pilot, John Clark, (Redtruck), driver and Bob Silver, officianado, began the Flatlands Hang gliding competition at Parkes, NSW. The competition quickly grew, from 16 pilots the first year to hosting a World Championship with 160 pilots towing from several wheat paddocks in western NSW. In 1986 Denis and 'Redtruck' took a group of international pilots to Alice Springs to take advantage of the massive thermals. Using the new system many world records were set. With the growing use of the system, other launch methods were incorporated, static winch and towing behind an ultralight trike or an ultralight airplane.

== Soaring flight and cross-country flying ==
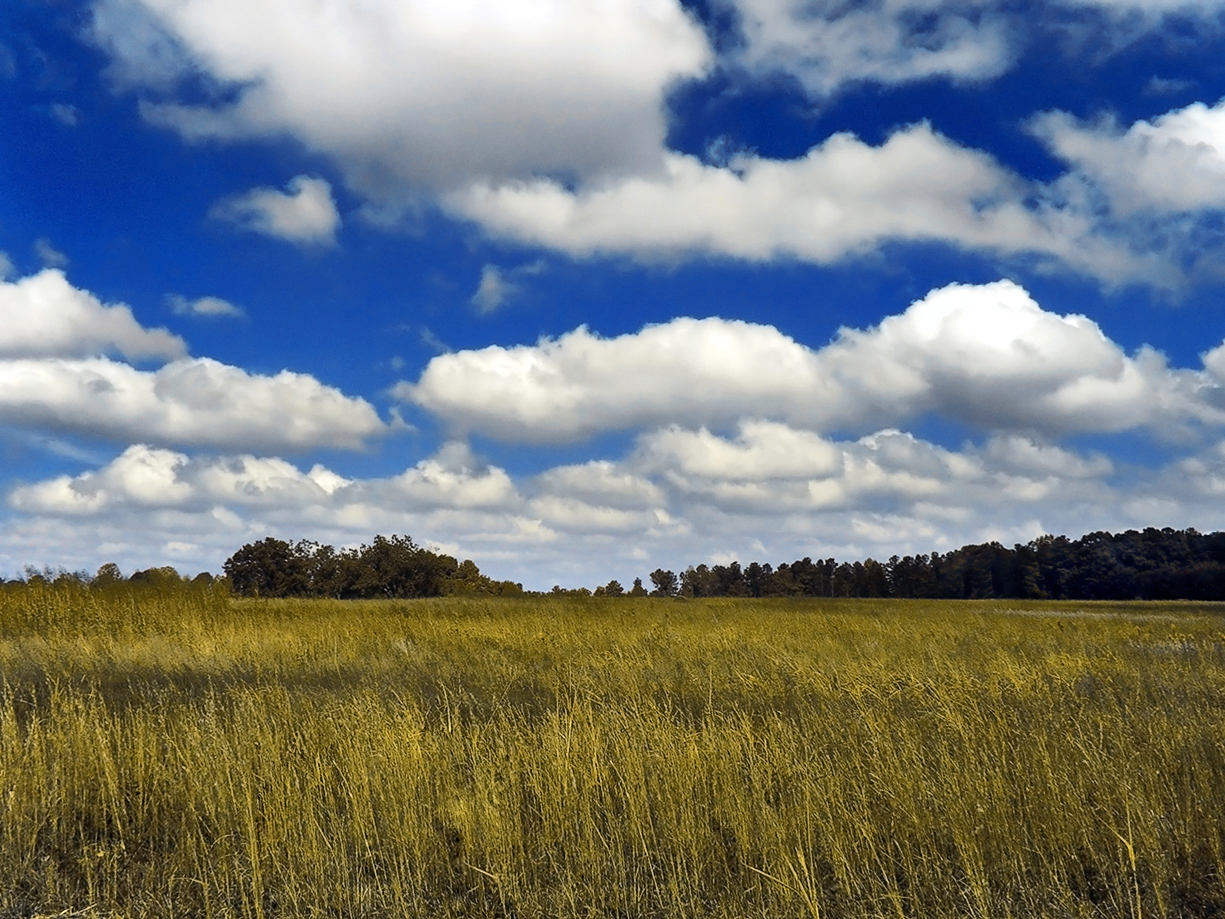
Good gliding weather. Well formed cumulus clouds with darker bases suggest active thermals and light winds.

A glider in flight is continuously descending, so to achieve an extended flight, the pilot must seek air currents rising faster than the sink rate of the glider. Selecting the sources of rising air currents is the skill that has to be mastered if the pilot wants to achieve flying long distances, known as cross-country (XC). Rising air masses derive from the following sources:

Thermals
The most commonly used source of lift is created by the Sun's energy heating the ground which in turn heats the air above it. This warm air rises in columns known as thermals. Soaring pilots quickly become aware of land features which can generate thermals and their trigger points downwind, because thermals have a surface tension with the ground and roll until hitting a trigger point. When the thermal lifts, the first indicator are the swooping birds feeding on the insects being carried aloft, or dust devils or a change in wind direction as the air is pulled in below the thermal. An instrument developed by Frank Colver in the early 1970s specifically for hang gliders called the Colver Variometer made a very big difference as pilots were then able to HEAR when they were rising or at least descending slower. The variometer emitted a tone when it was turned on. After launch, as the sink rate increased, the instrument emitted a lower tone. As the sink rate decreased, the tone became higher, passing through the zero sink rate and then rising higher and higher as the rate of climb increased. As the thermal climbs, bigger soaring birds indicate the thermal. The thermal rises until it either forms into a cumulus cloud or hits an inversion layer, which is where the surrounding air is becoming warmer with height, and stops the thermal developing into a cloud. Also, nearly every glider contains an instrument known as a variometer (a very sensitive vertical speed indicator) which shows visually (and often audibly) the presence of lift and sink. Having located a thermal, a glider pilot will circle within the area of rising air to gain height. In the case of a cloud street, thermals can line up with the wind, creating rows of thermals and sinking air. A pilot can use a cloud street to fly long straight-line distances by remaining in the row of rising air.
Ridge lift
Ridge lift occurs when the wind encounters a mountain, cliff, hill, sand dune, or any other raised terrain. The air is pushed up the windward face of the mountain, creating lift. The area of lift extending from the ridge is called the lift band. Providing the air is rising faster than the gliders sink rate, gliders can soar and climb in the rising air by flying within the lift band parallel to the ridge. Ridge soaring is also known as slope soaring.
Mountain waves
The third main type of lift used by glider pilots is the lee waves that occur near mountains. The obstruction to the airflow can generate standing waves with alternating areas of lift and sink. The top of each wave peak is often marked by lenticular cloud formations.
Convergence
Another form of lift results from the convergence of air masses, as with a sea-breeze front. More exotic forms of lift are the polar vortices which the Perlan Project hopes to use to soar to great altitudes. A rare phenomenon known as Morning Glory has also been used by glider pilots in Australia.

== Performance ==
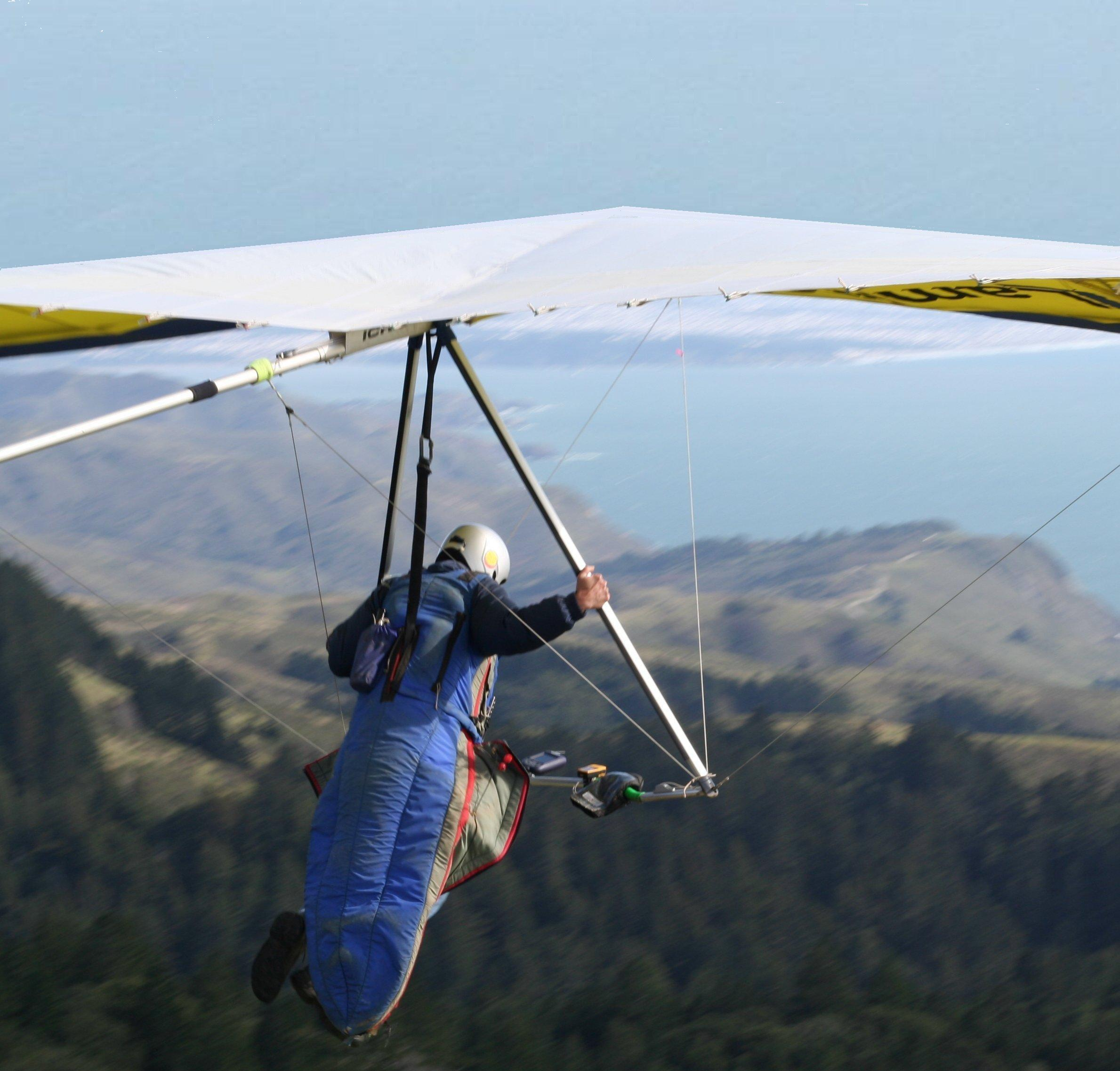
Hang glider launching from Mount Tamalpais

With each generation of materials and with the improvements in aerodynamics, the performance of hang gliders has increased. One measure of performance is the glide ratio. For example, a ratio of 12:1 means that in smooth air a glider can travel forward 12 metres while only losing 1 metre of altitude.

Some performance figures as of 2006:

- Topless gliders (no kingpost): glide ratio ~17:1, speed range ~30–145 km/h (19–90 mph), best glide at 45–60 km/h (28–37 mph)
- Rigid wings: glide ratio ~20:1, speed range ~35–130 km/h (22–81 mph), best glide at ~50–60 km/h (31–37 mph)..

Ballast
The extra weight provided by ballast is advantageous if the lift is likely to be strong. Although heavier gliders have a slight disadvantage when climbing in rising air, they achieve a higher speed at any given glide angle. This is an advantage in strong conditions when the gliders spend only little time climbing in thermals.

== Stability and equilibrium ==
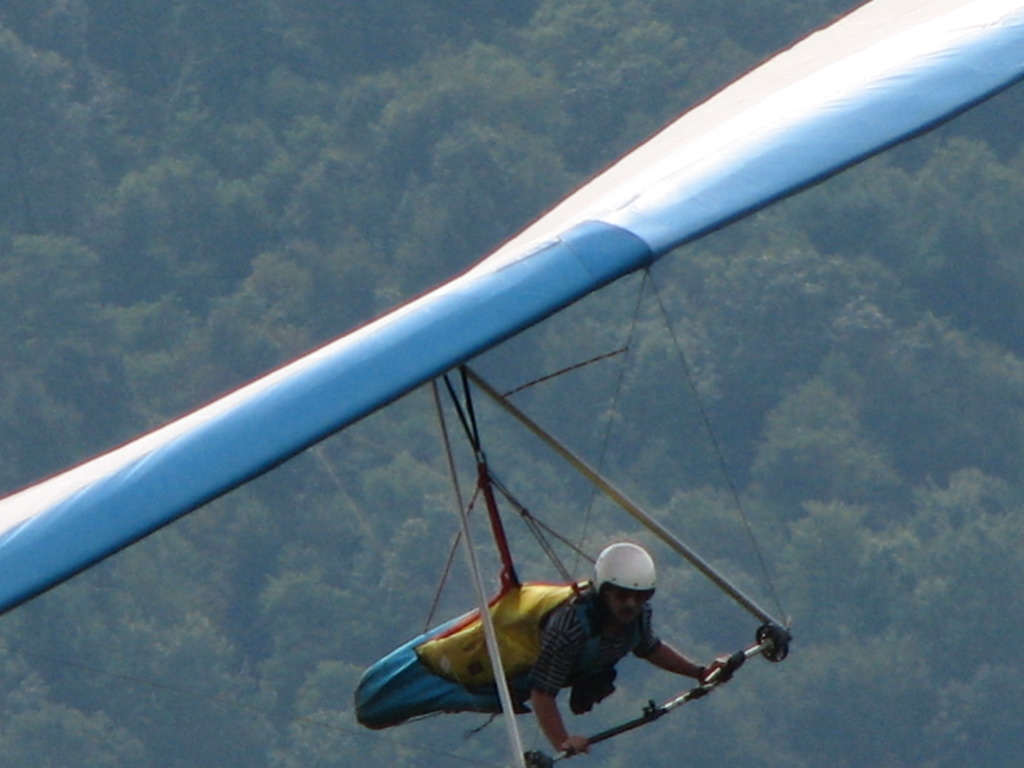
High performance flexible wing hang glider (2006)

Because hang gliders are most often used for recreational flying, a premium is placed on gentle behaviour, especially at the stall and natural pitch stability. The wing loading must be very low in order to allow the pilot to run fast enough to get above stall speed. Unlike a traditional aircraft with an extended fuselage and empennage for maintaining stability, hang gliders rely on the natural stability of their flexible wings to return to equilibrium in yaw and pitch. Roll stability is generally set to be near neutral. In calm air, a properly designed wing will maintain balanced trimmed flight with little pilot input. The flex wing pilot is suspended beneath the wing by a strap attached to their harness. The pilot lies prone (sometimes supine) within a large, triangular, metal control frame. Controlled flight is achieved by the pilot pushing and pulling on this control frame, thus shifting their weight fore or aft, and right or left in coordinated maneuvers.

Roll
Most flexible wings are set up with near neutral roll due to sideslip (anhedral effect). In the roll axis, the pilot shifts their body mass using the wing control bar, applying a rolling moment directly to the wing. The flexible wing is built to flex differentially across the span in response to the pilot applied roll moment. For example, if the pilot shifts their weight to the right, the right wing trailing edge flexes up more than the left, creating dissimilar lift that rolls the glider to the right.
Yaw
The yaw axis is stabilized through the backward-sweep of the wings. The swept planform, when yawed out of the relative wind, creates more lift on the advancing wing and also more drag, stabilizing the wing in yaw. If one wing advances ahead of the other, it presents more area to the wind and causes more drag on that side. This causes the advancing wing to go slower and to retreat back. The wing is at equilibrium when the aircraft is travelling straight and both wings present the same amount of area to the wind.
Pitch
The pitch control response is direct and very efficient. It is partially stabilized by the washout combined with the sweep of the wings, which results in a different angle of attack of the rear most lifting surfaces of the glider. The wing centre of gravity is close to the hang point and, at the trim speed, the wing will fly "hands off" and return to trim after being disturbed. The weight-shift control system only works when the wing is positively loaded (right side up). Positive pitching devices such as reflex lines or washout rods are employed to maintain a minimum safe amount of washout when the wing is unloaded or even negatively loaded (upside down). Flying faster than trim speed is accomplished by moving the pilot's weight forward in the control frame; flying slower by shifting the pilot's weight aft (pushing out).

Furthermore, the fact that the wing is designed to bend and flex, provides favourable dynamics analogous to a spring suspension. This provides a gentler flying experience than a similarly sized rigid-winged hang glider.

== Instruments ==
To maximize a pilot's understanding of how the hang glider is flying, most pilots carry flight instruments. The most basic being a variometer and altimeter—often combined. Some more advanced pilots also carry airspeed indicators and radios. When flying in competition or cross country, pilots often also carry maps and/or GPS units. Hang gliders do not have instrument panels as such, so all the instruments are mounted to the control frame of the glider or occasionally strapped to the pilot's forearm.

=== Variometer ===
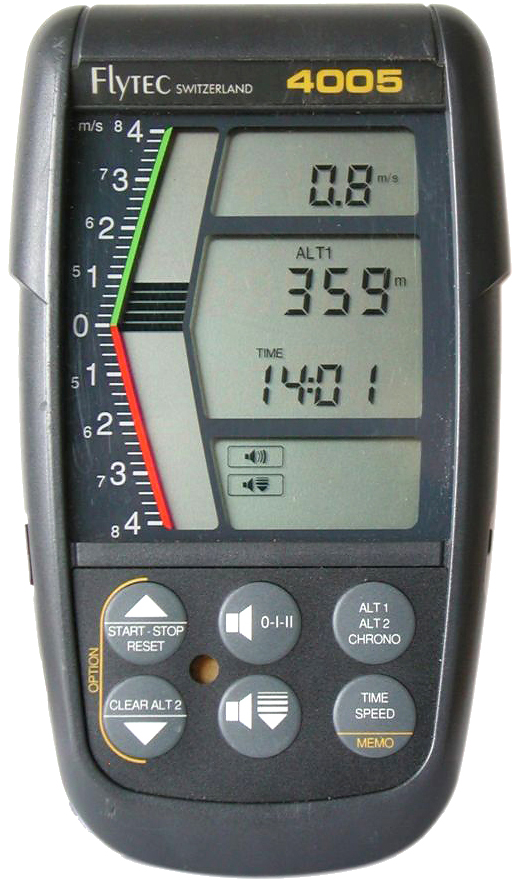
Vario-altimeter (c. 1998)

Gliding pilots are able to sense the acceleration forces when they first hit a thermal, but have difficulty gauging constant motion. Thus it is difficult to detect the difference between constantly rising air and constantly sinking air. A variometer is a very sensitive vertical speed indicator. The variometer indicates climb rate or sink rate with audio signals (beeps) and/or a visual display. These units are generally electronic, vary in sophistication, and often include an altimeter and an airspeed indicator. More advanced units often incorporate a barograph for recording flight data and/or a built-in GPS. The main purpose of a variometer is in helping a pilot find and stay in the 'core' of a thermal to maximize height gain, and conversely indicating when he or she is in sinking air and needs to find rising air. Variometers are sometimes capable of electronic calculations to indicate the optimal speed to fly for given conditions. The MacCready theory answers the question on how fast a pilot should cruise between thermals, given the average lift the pilot expects in the next thermal climb and the amount of lift or sink he encounters in cruise mode. Some electronic variometers make the calculations automatically, allowing for factors such as the glider's theoretical performance (glide ratio), altitude, hook in weight, and wind direction.

=== Radio ===
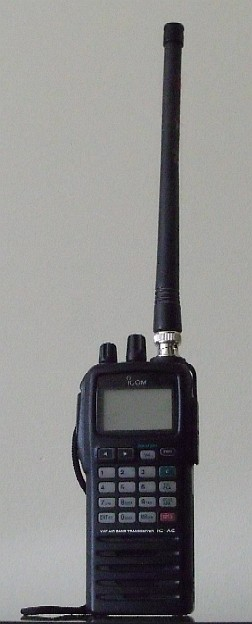
Aircraft radio

Pilots sometimes use 2-way radios for training purposes, for communicating with other pilots in the air, and with their ground crew when traveling on cross-country flights.

One type of radio used are PTT (push-to-talk) handheld transceivers, operating in VHF FM. Usually a microphone is worn on the head or incorporated in the helmet, and the PTT switch is either fixed to the outside of the helmet, or strapped to a finger. Operating a VHF band radio without an appropriate license is illegal in most countries that have regulated airwaves (including United States, Canada, Brazil, etc.), so additional information must be obtained with the national or local Hang Gliding association or with the competent radio regulatory authority.

As aircraft operating in airspace occupied by other aircraft, hang glider pilots may also use the appropriate type of radio (i.e. the aircraft transceiver into Aero Mobile Service VHF band). It can, of course, be fitted with a PTT switch to a finger and speakers inside the helmet. The use of aircraft transceivers is subject to regulations specific to the use in the air such as frequencies restrictions, but has several advantages over FM (i.e. frequency modulated) radios used in other services. First is the great range it has (without repeaters) because of its amplitude modulation (i.e. AM). Second is the ability to contact, inform and be informed directly by other aircraft pilots of their intentions thereby improving collision avoidance and increasing safety. Third is to allow greater liberty regarding distance flights in regulated airspaces, in which the aircraft radio is normally a legal requirement. Fourth is the universal emergency frequency monitored by all other users and satellites and used in case of emergency or impending emergency.

=== GPS ===
GPS (global positioning system) can be used to aid in navigation. For competitions, it is used to verify the contestant reached the required check-points.

== Records ==
Records are sanctioned by the FAI. The world record for straight distance is held by Dustin B. Martin, with a distance of 764 km (475 mi) in 2012, originating from Zapata, Texas.

Judy Leden (GBR) holds the altitude record for a balloon-launched hang glider: 11,800 m (38,800 ft) at Wadi Rum, Jordan on 25 October 1994. Leden also holds the gain of height record: 3,970 m (13,025 ft), set in 1992.

The altitude records for balloon-launched hang gliders:

Altitude records for balloon-launched hang gliders
Altitude	Location	Pilot	Date	Ref.
11,800 m (38,800 ft)	Wadi Rum, Jordan	Judy Leden	25 October 1994	
10,000 m (33,000 ft)	Edmonton, Alberta, Canada	John Bird	29 August 1982	
9,970 m (32,720 ft)	California City, California, USA	Stephan Dunoyer	9 September 1978	
9,600 m (31,600 ft)	Mojave Desert, California, USA	Bob McCaffrey	21 November 1976	
5,200 m (17,100 ft)	San Jose, California, USA	Dennis Kulberg	25 December 1974	

== Competition ==
Competitions started with "flying as long as possible" and spot landings. With increasing performance, cross-country flying has largely replaced them. Usually two to four waypoints have to be passed with a landing at a goal. In the late 1990s low-power GPS units were introduced and have completely replaced photographs of the goal. Every two years there is a world championship. The Rigid and Women's World Championship in 2006 was hosted by Quest Air in Florida. Big Spring, Texas hosted the 2007 World Championship. Hang gliding is also one of the competition categories in World Air Games organized by Fédération Aéronautique Internationale (World Air Sports Federation - FAI), which maintains a chronology of the FAI World Hang Gliding Championships.

Other forms of competition include Aerobatic competitions, and Speedgliding competitions, wherein the goal is to descend from a mountain as fast as possible while passing through various gates in a manner similar to down-hill skiing.

=== Classes ===
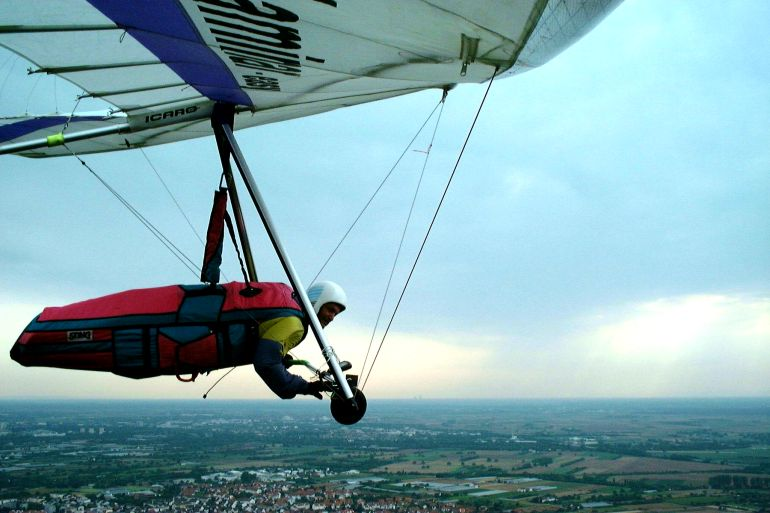
Modern 'flexible wing' hang glider

For competitive purposes, there are three classes of hang glider:

- Class 1 The flexible wing hang glider, having flight controlled by virtue of the shifted weight of the pilot. This is not a paraglider. Class 1 hang gliders sold in the United States are usually rated by the Hang Gliders Manufacturers' Association.
- Class 5 The rigid wing hang glider, having flight controlled by spoilers, typically on top of the wing. In both flexible and rigid wings the pilot hangs below the wing without any additional fairing.
- Class 2 (designated by the FAI as Sub-Class O-2) where the pilot is integrated into the wing by means of a fairing. These offer the best performance and are the most expensive.

== Aerobatics ==
There are four basic aerobatic maneuvers in a hang glider:

- Loop — a maneuver that starts in a wings level dive, climbs, without any rolling, to the apex where the glider is upside down, wings level (heading back where it came from), and then returning to the start altitude and heading, again without rolling, having completed an approximately circular path in the vertical plane.
- Spin — A spin is scored from the moment one wing stalls and the glider rotates noticeably into the spin. The entry heading is noted at this point. The glider must remain in the spin for at least 1/2 of a revolution to score any versatility spin points.
- Rollover — a maneuver where the apex heading is less than 90° left or right of the entry heading.
- Climb over — a maneuver where the apex heading is greater than 90° left or right of the entry heading.

== Comparison of hang gliders, paragliders, and gliders ==
Paragliders and hang gliders are both foot-launched glider aircraft from which cases the pilot is suspended ("hangs") below the lift surface, but hang gliders include a rigid aluminum frame, while paragliders are entirely flexible and look more similar to a parachute. Gliders and sailplanes are structured from composite materials and may have wheels, propellers, and engines.

	Paragliders	Hang gliders	Gliders/Sailplanes
Undercarriage	pilot's legs used for take-off and landing	pilot's legs used for take-off and landing	aircraft takes off and lands using a wheeled undercarriage or skids
Wing structure	entirely flexible, with shape maintained purely by the pressure of air flowing into and over the wing in flight and the tension of the lines	generally flexible but supported on a rigid frame which determines its shape (note that rigid-wing hang gliders also exist)	rigid wing surface which totally encases wing structure
Pilot position	sitting in a harness	usually lying prone in a cocoon-like harness suspended from the wing; seated and supine are also possible	sitting in a seat with a harness, surrounded by a crash-resistant structure
Speed range (stall speed – max speed)	slowest – typically 25 to 60 km/h for recreational gliders (over 50 km/h requires use of speed bar), hence easier to launch and fly in light winds; least wind penetration; pitch variation can be achieved with the controls	faster than paragliders, slower than gliders/sailplaines	maximum speed up to about 280 km/h (170 mph); stall speed typically 65 km/h (40 mph); able to fly in windier turbulent conditions and can outrun bad weather; good penetration into a headwind
Maximum glide ratio	about 10, relatively poor glide performance makes long distance flights more difficult; current (as of July 2025) world record is 609.9 kilometres (380 mi)	about 17, with up to 20 for rigid wings	open class sailplanes – typically around 60:1, but in more common 15–18 meter span aircraft, glide ratios are between 38:1 and 52:1; high glide performance enabling long distance flight, with 3,000 kilometres (1,900 mi) being current (as of November 2010) record
Turn radius	tightest turn radius	somewhat larger turn radius than paragliders, tighter than gliders/sailplanes	widest turn radius but still able to circle tightly in thermals
Landing	smallest space needed to land, offering more landing options from cross-country flights; also easiest to pack up and carry like a bag to the nearest road	15 m to 60 m length flat area required; can be derigged by one person and carried to the nearest road	landings can be performed in ~250 m length field. Aerial retrieval may be possible but if not, specialized trailer needed to retrieve by road. Some sailplanes have engines that remove the need for an out-landing, if successfully started on time
Learning	simplest and quickest to learn	teaching is done in single and two-seat hang gliders	teaching is done in a two-seat glider with dual controls
Convenience	packs smaller (easier to transport and store)	more awkward to transport and store; longer to rig and de-rig; often transported on the roof of a car	often stored and transported in purpose-built trailers about 9 metres long, from which they are rigged. Although rigging aids allow a single person to rig a glider, usually the rigging involves 2 or 3 people. Some frequently used sailplanes are stored already rigged in hangars.
Cost	cost of new is €1500 and up, cheapest but shortest lasting (around 500 hours flying time, depending on treatment), active second-hand market		cost of new glider very high (top of the range 18 m turbo with instruments and trailer €250,000) but it is long lasting (up to several decades), so active second-hand market; typical cost is from €2,000 to €145,000

== Hang gliding in media ==
- 1971: Early rock video featuring hang gliding, Sweeney's Glider, is produced. It was made by Fitz Weatherby and featured Terry Sweeney.
- 1973: First film made on the sport of hang gliding, Hang Gliding: The New Freedom, directed by Ron Underwood. It was distributed by Paramount Communications, a short film division of Paramount Pictures.

== See also ==
- Glider (disambiguation)
- Human-powered aircraft
- Kite types – Tethered objects which fly by aerodynamic forces
- Microlift glider – Class of gliders
- Nanolight
- Powered hang glider – Foot-launched powered hang glider
- Powered paraglider – Form of ultralight aviation
