= Darley Moor Airfield =

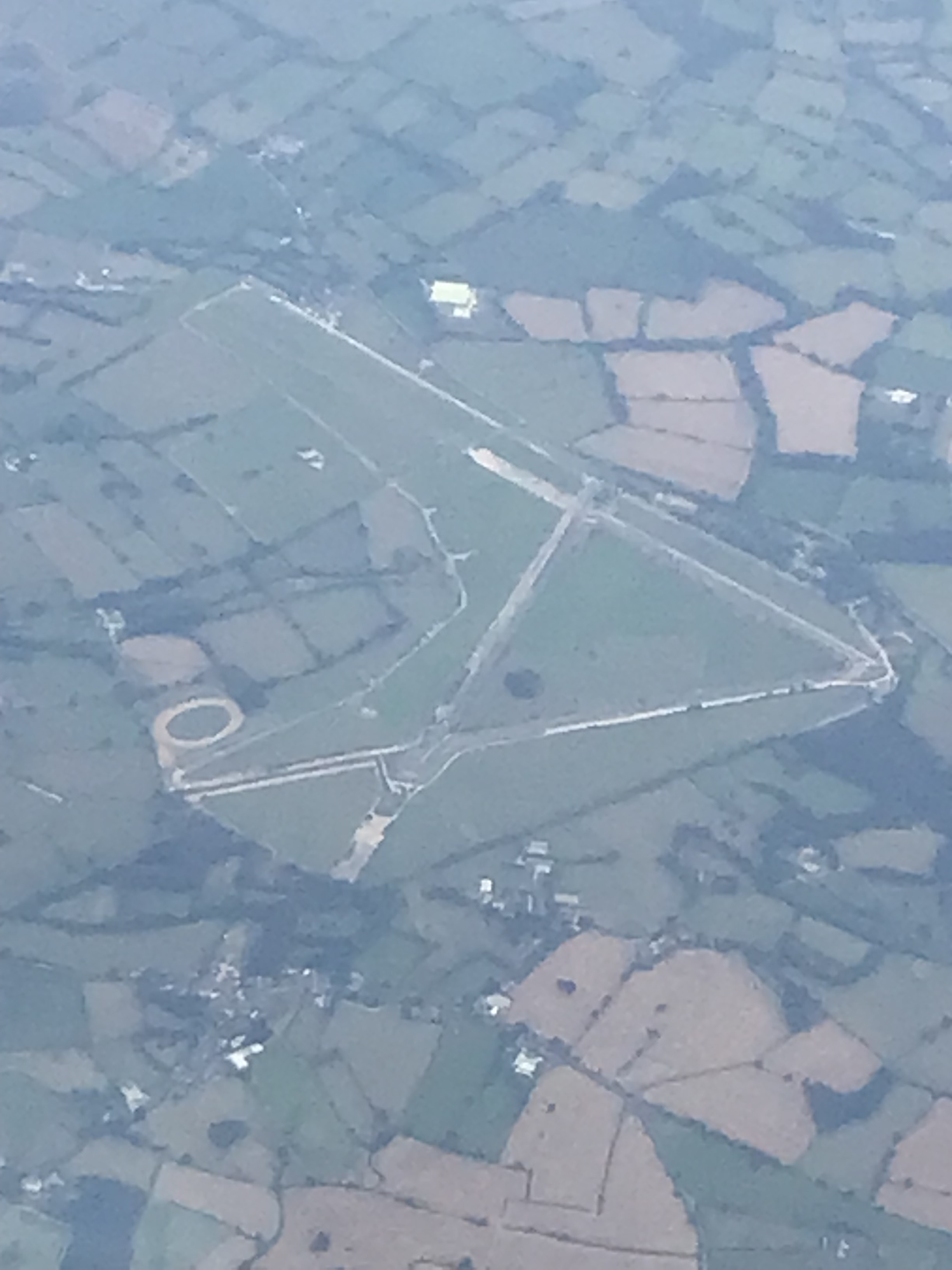
- IATA: none; ICAO: none; GPS: N52°58.68 W001°44.58

Summary
- Airport type: Private
- Owner/Operator: Airways Airsports
- Location: Adjacent to A515, Ashbourne, Derbyshire, UK
- Built: 1942
- In use: 1942–1955 (RAF); 1955 onwards (civilian)
- Elevation AMSL: 580 ft (180 m)
- Coordinates: 52°58′7.68″N 1°45′3.6″W
- Website: www.airways-airsports.com

Map
- Location in Ashbourne Darley Moor Airfield (the United Kingdom)

Runways
Direction	Length		Surface
Direction	ft	m	Surface
02L/20R	2,132	650	Grass

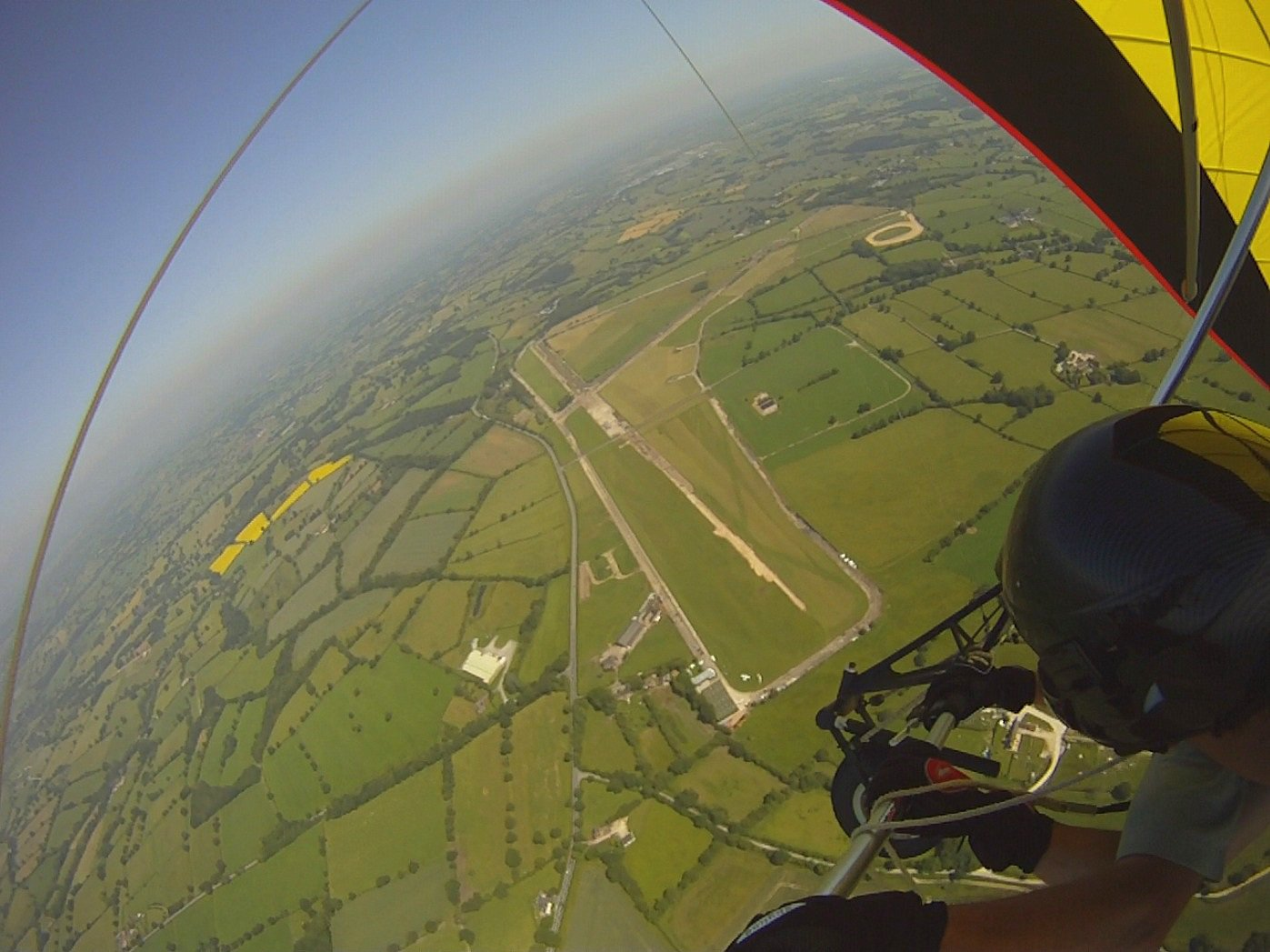
Darley Moor Airfield from above

Darley Moor Airfield and Road Race Circuit is situated on a high plateau adjacent to the A515, two miles south of Ashbourne, Derbyshire, England. The airfield is operated by Airways Airsports providing training in almost every type of leisure flying. The Second World War runway was transformed into Darley Moor Racetrack holding regular events since 1965 for motorbike and more recently cycle racing.

In June 2026, concerns were raised over a large-scale residential development strategy involving a local plan by Derbyshire Dales District Council and active commercial advertising of the site which could have future impact on both the motor racing and aviation aspects. The racing club confirmed it had five further years to run on the existing lease.

== History ==
The airfield was built in 1942 and opened during June 1942 it was used by the Royal Air Force (RAF) during the Second World War for training purposes by No. 42 Operational Training Unit. Following the war it was in use until 1954 for ordnance servicing and storage. Since then it has been in use in its current form: motorsport, leisure aviation and agriculture.

It is close to another WW2 airfield in Ashbourne that is now an industrial estate. Nearby towns and villages include Ashbourne in the Derbyshire Dales to the northwest is Snelston and South is Cubley

In 2010–2011 Airways Airsports developed the airfield by building a large hangar to store aircraft used on a daily basis.

== Race track ==
The majority of the RAF concrete runways were converted into Darley Moor Racetrack by the West Midlands Racing Club initially taking a 12-month lease, laying a new surface and with an agreement that racing and practice would be restricted to a 6-hour period between midday and 6 pm.

Set amongst farmland, the peripheral and centre areas are used for arable crops and grazing.

The circuit is now primarily used for motorcycle races and track days, run by Darley Moor Motor Cycle Road Race Club (D.M.M.R.R.C.) The track is also used for closed circuit road cycling events.

== Airfield ==
The airfield is in "G" airspace. Proximity to East Midlands Airport places the ceiling at 4000 ft AMSL before restrictions apply. The airpark covers 80 acres and while the main runway runs approximately north–south there are grass strips allowing takeoff/landing in all wind directions.
